= List of municipalities in North Carolina =

A map of the United States of America with the state of North Carolina highlighted

North Carolina is a state located in the Southern United States. As of the 2020 census, 10,439,388 lived in North Carolina, further growing to 11,197,968 in the 2025 estimate.

North Carolina is the 9th-most populous state and 29th-largest by land area, spanning 48,624.450 square miles (125,936.75 km^{2}) of land. North Carolina is divided into 100 counties and contains 553 municipalities consisting of 77 cities, 455 towns, and 21 villages. The three different terms have no legal distinction.

== Municipalities ==
County seat
State capital and county seat

2025 rank	Municipality	Designation	Primary county	Secondary county(ies)	Population		
2025 rank	Municipality	Designation	Primary county	Secondary county(ies)	2025 Estimate	2020 census	2020–2025 Change
1	Charlotte	City	Mecklenburg		964,784	874,579	+10.31%
2	Raleigh	City	Wake	Durham	506,306	467,665	+8.26%
3	Greensboro	City	Guilford		308,667	299,035	+3.22%
4	Durham	City	Durham	Wake, Orange	305,561	283,506	+7.78%
5	Winston-Salem	City	Forsyth		257,271	249,545	+3.10%
6	Fayetteville	City	Cumberland		209,120	208,501	+0.30%
7	Cary	Town	Wake	Chatham	183,582	174,721	+5.07%
8	Wilmington	City	New Hanover		126,809	115,451	+9.84%
9	High Point	City	Guilford	Davidson, Forsyth, Randolph	120,571	114,059	+5.71%
10	Concord	City	Cabarrus		114,598	105,240	+8.89%
11	Greenville	City	Pitt		96,443	87,521	+10.19%
12	Asheville	City	Buncombe		93,523	94,589	−1.13%
13	Gastonia	City	Gaston		87,067	80,411	+8.28%
14	Apex	Town	Wake		80,419	58,780	+36.81%
15	Jacksonville	City	Onslow		72,732	72,723	+0.01%
16	Huntersville	Town	Mecklenburg		68,535	61,376	+11.66%
17	Chapel Hill	Town	Orange	Durham	63,565	61,960	+2.59%
18	Kannapolis	City	Cabarrus	Rowan	61,708	53,114	+16.18%
19	Burlington	City	Alamance	Guilford	61,496	57,303	+7.32%
20	Wake Forest	Town	Wake	Franklin	58,147	47,601	+22.15%
21	Mooresville	Town	Iredell		55,842	50,193	+11.25%
22	Rocky Mount	City	Nash	Edgecombe	55,120	54,341	+1.43%
23	Holly Springs	Town	Wake		50,288	41,239	+21.94%
24	Wilson	City	Wilson		49,572	47,851	+3.60%
25	Fuquay-Varina	Town	Wake		48,536	34,152	+42.12%
26	Hickory	City	Catawba	Burke, Caldwell	45,975	43,490	+5.71%
27	Indian Trail	Town	Union		44,303	39,997	+10.77%
28	Monroe	City	Union		42,644	34,562	+23.38%
29	Garner	Town	Wake		41,562	31,159	+33.39%
30	Salisbury	City	Rowan		36,879	35,540	+3.77%
31	Leland	Town	Brunswick		35,731	22,908	+55.98%
32	Cornelius	Town	Mecklenburg		35,094	31,412	+11.72%
33	Goldsboro	City	Wayne		35,012	33,657	+4.03%
34	New Bern	City	Craven		34,724	31,291	+10.97%
35	Sanford	City	Lee		34,138	30,261	+12.81%
36	Matthews	Town	Mecklenburg		32,769	29,435	+11.33%
37	Clayton	Town	Johnston	Wake	32,633	26,307	+24.05%
38	Morrisville	Town	Wake	Durham	32,466	29,630	+9.57%
39	Statesville	City	Iredell		32,181	28,419	+13.24%
40	Mint Hill	Town	Mecklenburg	Union	29,476	26,450	+11.44%
41	Kernersville	Town	Forsyth	Guilford	29,128	26,449	+10.13%
42	Asheboro	City	Randolph		27,990	27,156	+3.07%
43	Thomasville	City	Davidson	Randolph	27,733	27,183	+2.02%
44	Shelby	City	Cleveland		23,309	21,918	+6.35%
45	Knightdale	Town	Wake		23,144	19,435	+19.08%
46	Waxhaw	Town	Union		23,140	20,534	+12.69%
47	Clemmons	Village	Forsyth		22,808	21,163	+7.77%
48	Mebane	City	Alamance	Orange	21,952	17,797	+23.35%
49	Carrboro	Town	Orange		20,962	21,295	−1.56%
50	Harrisburg	Town	Cabarrus		20,742	18,967	+9.36%
51	Lexington	City	Davidson		20,238	19,632	+3.09%
52	Graham	City	Alamance		20,131	17,157	+17.33%
53	Boone	Town	Watauga		19,929	19,092	+4.38%
54	Kinston	City	Lenoir		19,705	19,900	−0.98%
55	Wendell	Town	Wake		19,687	9,793	+101.03%
56	Elizabeth City	City	Pasquotank	Camden	19,622	18,631	+5.32%
57	Mount Holly	City	Gaston		19,033	17,703	+7.51%
58	Lumberton	City	Robeson		18,955	19,025	−0.37%
59	Pinehurst	Village	Moore		18,670	17,581	+6.19%
60	Lenoir	City	Caldwell		18,372	18,352	+0.11%
61	Hope Mills	Town	Cumberland		18,324	17,808	+2.90%
62	Morganton	City	Burke		17,849	17,474	+2.15%
63	Albemarle	City	Stanly		17,769	16,432	+8.14%
64	Stallings	Town	Union	Mecklenburg	17,760	16,112	+10.23%
65	Havelock	City	Craven		17,430	16,621	+4.87%
66	Southern Pines	Town	Moore		17,357	15,545	+11.66%
67	Davidson	Town	Mecklenburg	Iredell	16,662	15,106	+10.30%
68	Belmont	City	Gaston		16,415	15,010	+9.36%
69	Hendersonville	City	Henderson		15,867	15,137	+4.82%
70	Eden	City	Rockingham		15,500	15,421	+0.51%
71	Henderson	City	Vance		15,013	15,060	−0.31%
72	Reidsville	City	Rockingham		14,692	14,583	+0.75%
73	Laurinburg	City	Scotland		14,582	14,978	−2.64%
74	Weddington	Town	Union		14,517	13,181	+10.14%
75	Lewisville	Town	Forsyth		14,421	13,381	+7.77%
76	Roanoke Rapids	City	Halifax		14,386	15,229	−5.54%
77	Newton	City	Catawba		13,822	13,148	+5.13%
78	Smithfield	Town	Johnston		13,114	11,292	+16.14%
79	Rolesville	Town	Wake		12,839	9,475	+35.50%
80	Lincolnton	City	Lincoln		12,465	11,091	+12.39%
81	Archdale	City	Randolph	Guilford	12,254	11,907	+2.91%
82	Kings Mountain	City	Cleveland	Gaston	12,117	11,142	+8.75%
83	Zebulon	Town	Wake		11,933	6,903	+72.87%
84	Pineville	Town	Mecklenburg		11,851	10,602	+11.78%
85	Elon	Town	Alamance		11,366	11,336	+0.26%
86	Summerfield	Town	Guilford		11,327	10,951	+3.43%
87	Spring Lake	Town	Cumberland		11,252	11,660	−3.50%
88	Waynesville	Town	Haywood		11,006	10,140	+8.54%
89	Tarboro	Town	Edgecombe		10,979	10,721	+2.41%
90	Winterville	Town	Pitt		10,973	10,462	+4.88%
91	Mount Airy	City	Surry		10,682	10,676	+0.06%
92	Morehead City	Town	Carteret		10,434	9,556	+9.19%
93	Aberdeen	Town	Moore		10,066	8,516	+18.20%
94	Washington	City	Beaufort		9,910	9,875	+0.35%
95	Gibsonville	Town	Guilford	Alamance	9,876	8,920	+10.72%
96	Hillsborough	Town	Orange		9,778	9,660	+1.22%
97	Wesley Chapel	Village	Union		9,566	8,681	+10.19%
98	Angier	Town	Harnett	Wake	9,410	5,265	+78.73%
99	Oak Island	Town	Brunswick		9,337	8,396	+11.21%
100	Oxford	City	Granville		8,985	8,628	+4.14%
101	Conover	City	Catawba		8,938	8,421	+6.14%
102	Rockingham	City	Richmond		8,815	9,243	−4.63%
103	Dunn	City	Harnett		8,814	8,446	+4.36%
104	Black Mountain	Town	Buncombe		8,491	8,426	+0.77%
105	Clinton	City	Sampson		8,466	8,383	+0.99%
106	Roxboro	City	Person		8,380	8,134	+3.02%
107	Fletcher	Town	Henderson		8,373	7,987	+4.83%
108	Woodfin	Town	Buncombe		8,229	7,936	+3.69%
109	Siler City	Town	Chatham		8,155	7,702	+5.88%
110	Butner	Town	Granville		8,112	8,397	−3.39%
111	Brevard	City	Transylvania		8,098	7,744	+4.57%
112	King	City	Stokes	Forsyth	7,977	7,197	+10.84%
113	Oak Ridge	Town	Guilford		7,896	7,474	+5.65%
114	Kill Devil Hills	Town	Dare		7,731	7,656	+0.98%
115	Mills River	Town	Henderson		7,504	7,078	+6.02%
116	Marion	City	McDowell		7,440	7,717	−3.59%
117	Forest City	Town	Rutherford		7,410	7,377	+0.45%
118	Selma	Town	Johnston		7,406	6,317	+17.24%
119	Unionville	Town	Union		7,322	6,643	+10.22%
120	St. James	Town	Brunswick		7,318	6,529	+12.08%
121	Trinity	City	Randolph		7,274	7,006	+3.83%
122	Marvin	Village	Union		7,040	6,358	+10.73%
123	Boiling Spring Lakes	City	Brunswick		6,875	5,943	+15.68%
124	Carolina Beach	Town	New Hanover		6,870	6,564	+4.66%
125	Cherryville	City	Gaston		6,523	6,078	+7.32%
126	Dallas	Town	Gaston		6,392	5,927	+7.85%
127	Mocksville	Town	Davie		6,282	5,900	+6.47%
128	Stokesdale	Town	Guilford		6,133	5,924	+3.53%
129	Locust	City	Stanly	Cabarrus	6,120	4,537	+34.89%
130	Walkertown	Town	Forsyth		6,120	5,692	+7.52%
131	Nashville	Town	Nash		5,911	5,632	+4.95%
132	Holly Ridge	Town	Onslow		5,908	4,171	+41.64%
133	Hamlet	City	Richmond		5,870	6,025	−2.57%
134	Bessemer City	City	Gaston		5,834	5,428	+7.48%
135	Cramerton	Town	Gaston		5,713	5,296	+7.87%
136	Archer Lodge	Town	Johnston		5,649	4,797	+17.76%
137	Carolina Shores	Town	Brunswick		5,540	4,588	+20.75%
138	Whispering Pines	Village	Moore		5,505	4,987	+10.39%
139	Long View	Town	Catawba	Burke	5,387	5,088	+5.88%
140	Shallotte	Town	Brunswick		5,335	4,185	+27.48%
141	Ayden	Town	Pitt		5,263	4,977	+5.75%
142	Pleasant Garden	Town	Guilford		5,165	5,000	+3.30%
143	Midland	Town	Cabarrus		5,151	4,684	+9.97%
144	Surf City	Town	Pender	Onslow	5,142	3,867	+32.97%
145	Sawmills	Town	Caldwell		5,105	5,020	+1.69%
146	Midway	Town	Davidson		5,104	4,742	+7.63%
147	Williamston	Town	Martin		5,086	5,248	−3.09%
148	Pittsboro	Town	Chatham		5,054	4,537	+11.40%
149	Creedmoor	City	Granville		5,046	4,866	+3.70%
150	Lillington	Town	Harnett		5,040	4,735	+6.44%
151	Wadesboro	Town	Anson		5,035	5,008	+0.54%
152	Granite Falls	Town	Caldwell		4,964	4,965	−0.02%
153	Erwin	Town	Harnett		4,956	4,542	+9.11%
154	Beaufort	Town	Carteret		4,912	4,464	+10.04%
155	Ranlo	Town	Gaston		4,848	4,511	+7.47%
156	Boiling Springs	Town	Cleveland		4,799	4,615	+3.99%
157	Weaverville	Town	Buncombe		4,790	4,567	+4.88%
158	Randleman	City	Randolph		4,767	4,595	+3.74%
159	Whiteville	City	Columbus		4,765	4,766	−0.02%
160	Valdese	Town	Burke		4,712	4,689	+0.49%
161	Raeford	City	Hoke		4,703	4,559	+3.16%
162	Benson	Town	Johnston	Harnett	4,660	3,967	+17.47%
163	China Grove	Town	Rowan		4,650	4,434	+4.87%
164	Sunset Beach	Town	Brunswick		4,642	4,175	+11.19%
165	Wingate	Town	Union		4,628	4,055	+14.13%
166	Ahoskie	Town	Hertford		4,608	4,891	−5.79%
167	Farmville	Town	Pitt		4,577	4,461	+2.60%
168	Edenton	Town	Chowan		4,546	4,460	+1.93%
169	Mount Olive	Town	Wayne		4,521	4,198	+7.69%
170	Newport	Town	Carteret		4,500	4,364	+3.12%
171	Southport	City	Brunswick		4,434	3,971	+11.66%
172	Canton	Town	Haywood		4,418	4,422	−0.09%
173	Franklin	Town	Macon		4,403	4,175	+5.46%
174	North Wilkesboro	Town	Wilkes		4,369	4,382	−0.30%
175	Troutman	Town	Iredell		4,336	3,698	+17.25%
176	Stanley	Town	Gaston		4,237	3,963	+6.91%
177	Spindale	Town	Rutherford		4,180	4,225	−1.07%
178	Swansboro	Town	Onslow		4,174	3,744	+11.49%
179	Elkin	Town	Surry	Wilkes	4,130	4,122	+0.19%
180	Trent Woods	Town	Craven		4,070	4,074	−0.10%
181	Emerald Isle	Town	Carteret		3,970	3,847	+3.20%
182	Lowell	City	Gaston		3,939	3,654	+7.80%
183	Maiden	Town	Catawba	Lincoln	3,922	3,736	+4.98%
184	Burgaw	Town	Pender		3,903	3,088	+26.39%
185	Tabor City	Town	Columbus		3,886	3,781	+2.78%
186	Landis	Town	Rowan		3,885	3,690	+5.28%
187	Fairview	Town	Union		3,805	3,456	+10.10%
188	Jamestown	Town	Guilford		3,803	3,668	+3.68%
189	Hudson	Town	Caldwell		3,786	3,780	+0.16%
190	Eastover	Town	Cumberland		3,743	3,656	+2.38%
191	Rutherfordton	Town	Rutherford		3,723	3,640	+2.28%
192	Gamewell	Town	Caldwell		3,713	3,702	+0.30%
193	Kitty Hawk	Town	Dare		3,670	3,689	−0.52%
194	Flat Rock	Village	Henderson		3,643	3,486	+4.50%
195	Wilkesboro	Town	Wilkes		3,618	3,687	−1.87%
196	Lake Park	Village	Union		3,609	3,269	+10.40%
197	Rural Hall	Town	Forsyth		3,607	3,351	+7.64%
198	Wallace	Town	Duplin	Pender	3,570	3,413	+4.60%
199	Red Oak	Town	Nash		3,523	3,342	+5.42%
200	Mineral Springs	Town	Union		3,514	3,159	+11.24%
201	Louisburg	Town	Franklin		3,480	3,064	+13.58%
202	Windsor	Town	Bertie		3,469	3,582	−3.15%
203	Spencer	Town	Rowan		3,450	3,308	+4.29%
204	Green Level	Town	Alamance		3,409	3,152	+8.15%
205	Bermuda Run	Town	Davie		3,323	3,120	+6.51%
206	Elizabethtown	Town	Bladen		3,306	3,296	+0.30%
207	Wallburg	Town	Davidson		3,255	3,051	+6.69%
208	Red Springs	Town	Robeson		3,216	3,087	+4.18%
209	Belville	Town	Brunswick		3,199	2,406	+32.96%
210	Plymouth	Town	Washington		3,170	3,320	−4.52%
211	Granite Quarry	Town	Rowan		3,129	2,984	+4.86%
212	Nags Head	Town	Dare		3,117	3,168	−1.61%
213	Southern Shores	Town	Dare		3,110	3,090	+0.65%
214	Carthage	Town	Moore		3,070	2,775	+10.63%
215	Calabash	Town	Brunswick		3,069	2,011	+52.61%
216	Yadkinville	Town	Yadkin		3,055	2,995	+2.00%
217	Troy	Town	Montgomery		3,020	2,850	+5.96%
218	Wilson's Mills	Town	Johnston		2,987	2,534	+17.88%
219	Four Oaks	Town	Johnston		2,978	2,158	+38.00%
220	La Grange	Town	Lenoir		2,947	2,595	+13.56%
221	Franklinton	Town	Franklin		2,890	2,456	+17.67%
222	River Bend	Town	Craven		2,890	2,902	−0.41%
223	Pembroke	Town	Robeson		2,888	2,823	+2.30%
224	Warsaw	Town	Duplin		2,853	2,733	+4.39%
225	Wentworth	Town	Rockingham		2,774	2,662	+4.21%
226	Tobaccoville	Village	Forsyth	Stokes	2,770	2,578	+7.45%
227	Liberty	Town	Randolph		2,739	2,655	+3.16%
228	Marshville	Town	Union		2,739	2,522	+8.60%
229	Cajah's Mountain	Town	Caldwell		2,702	2,722	−0.73%
230	Sylva	Town	Jackson		2,691	2,578	+4.38%
231	Swepsonville	Town	Alamance		2,632	2,445	+7.65%
232	Norwood	Town	Stanly		2,568	2,367	+8.49%
233	Grifton	Town	Pitt	Lenoir	2,539	2,448	+3.72%
234	Mayodan	Town	Rockingham		2,503	2,418	+3.52%
235	Richlands	Town	Onslow		2,485	2,287	+8.66%
236	Youngsville	Town	Franklin		2,461	2,016	+22.07%
237	Haw River	Town	Alamance		2,425	2,252	+7.68%
238	Rockwell	Town	Rowan		2,417	2,302	+5.00%
239	Pine Level	Town	Johnston		2,405	2,046	+17.55%
240	Wrightsville Beach	Town	New Hanover		2,397	2,473	−3.07%
241	Coats	Town	Harnett		2,370	2,155	+9.98%
242	Laurel Park	Town	Henderson		2,360	2,250	+4.89%
243	Jonesville	Town	Yadkin		2,356	2,308	+2.08%
244	Taylorsville	Town	Alexander		2,333	2,320	+0.56%
245	Oakboro	Town	Stanly		2,316	2,128	+8.83%
246	Mars Hill	Town	Madison		2,280	2,007	+13.60%
247	Cape Carteret	Town	Carteret		2,273	2,224	+2.20%
248	Murfreesboro	Town	Hertford		2,242	2,619	−14.39%
249	Fairmont	Town	Robeson		2,231	2,191	+1.83%
250	Spruce Pine	Town	Mitchell		2,211	2,194	+0.77%
251	Madison	Town	Rockingham		2,190	2,129	+2.87%
252	Maxton	Town	Robeson	Scotland	2,149	2,110	+1.85%
253	Kure Beach	Town	New Hanover		2,145	2,191	−2.10%
254	St. Pauls	Town	Robeson		2,109	2,045	+3.13%
255	Hertford	Town	Perquimans		2,011	1,934	+3.98%
256	Sparta	Town	Alleghany		1,918	1,834	+4.58%
257	Badin	Town	Stanly		1,915	2,024	−5.39%
258	Navassa	Town	Brunswick		1,889	1,367	+38.19%
259	Biscoe	Town	Montgomery		1,887	1,848	+2.11%
260	Yanceyville	Town	Caswell		1,850	1,937	−4.49%
261	Cedar Point	Town	Carteret		1,825	1,764	+3.46%
262	Mount Pleasant	Town	Cabarrus		1,816	1,671	+8.68%
263	Murphy	Town	Cherokee		1,808	1,608	+12.44%
264	Ramseur	Town	Randolph		1,806	1,774	+1.80%
265	Andrews	Town	Cherokee		1,799	1,667	+7.92%
266	Sharpsburg	Town	Nash	Wilson, Edgecombe	1,798	1,697	+5.95%
267	Claremont	City	Catawba		1,790	1,692	+5.79%
268	Enfield	Town	Halifax		1,777	1,865	−4.72%
269	Drexel	Town	Burke		1,764	1,760	+0.23%
270	Hemby Bridge	Town	Union		1,764	1,614	+9.29%
271	Maggie Valley	Town	Haywood		1,748	1,687	+3.62%
272	Stanfield	Town	Stanly		1,744	1,585	+10.03%
273	Kenly	Town	Johnston	Wilson	1,722	1,491	+15.49%
274	Polkton	Town	Anson		1,722	2,250	−23.47%
275	Hildebran	Town	Burke		1,691	1,679	+0.71%
276	Jefferson	Town	Ashe		1,680	1,622	+3.58%
277	Bladenboro	Town	Bladen		1,656	1,648	+0.49%
278	Burnsville	Town	Yancey		1,655	1,614	+2.54%
279	East Spencer	Town	Rowan		1,650	1,567	+5.30%
280	Tryon	Town	Polk		1,634	1,562	+4.61%
281	Denton	Town	Davidson		1,610	1,494	+7.76%
282	Walnut Cove	Town	Stokes		1,609	1,586	+1.45%
283	Snow Hill	Town	Greene		1,588	1,481	+7.22%
284	Scotland Neck	Town	Halifax		1,586	1,640	−3.29%
285	Manteo	Town	Dare		1,585	1,600	−0.94%
286	Pinebluff	Town	Moore		1,571	1,473	+6.65%
287	Glen Alpine	Town	Burke		1,552	1,529	+1.50%
288	Connelly Springs	Town	Burke		1,550	1,529	+1.37%
289	Princeton	Town	Johnston		1,544	1,315	+17.41%
290	Chadbourn	Town	Columbus		1,539	1,574	−2.22%
291	Bryson City	Town	Swain		1,525	1,558	−2.12%
292	Dobson	Town	Surry		1,474	1,462	+0.82%
293	Biltmore Forest	Town	Buncombe		1,469	1,409	+4.26%
294	Pilot Mountain	Town	Surry		1,437	1,440	−0.21%
295	Rose Hill	Town	Duplin		1,429	1,371	+4.23%
296	Foxfire	Village	Moore		1,426	1,288	+10.71%
297	Pine Knoll Shores	Town	Carteret		1,423	1,388	+2.52%
298	Bethel	Town	Pitt		1,422	1,373	+3.57%
299	Belhaven	Town	Beaufort		1,414	1,410	+0.28%
300	Atlantic Beach	Town	Carteret		1,408	1,364	+3.23%
301	Lake Lure	Town	Rutherford		1,391	1,365	+1.90%
302	Spring Hope	Town	Nash		1,383	1,309	+5.65%
303	Broadway	Town	Lee	Harnett	1,380	1,267	+8.92%
304	Weldon	Town	Halifax		1,374	1,444	−4.85%
305	Stoneville	Town	Rockingham		1,364	1,308	+4.28%
306	Clyde	Town	Haywood		1,355	1,368	−0.95%
307	West Jefferson	Town	Ashe		1,348	1,279	+5.39%
308	Blowing Rock	Town	Watauga	Caldwell	1,324	1,376	−3.78%
309	Stedman	Town	Cumberland		1,312	1,277	+2.74%
310	Robbins	Town	Moore		1,305	1,168	+11.73%
311	Princeville	Town	Edgecombe		1,286	1,254	+2.55%
312	Franklinville	Town	Randolph		1,256	1,197	+4.93%
313	Elm City	Town	Wilson	Nash	1,250	1,218	+2.63%
314	Banner Elk	Town	Avery		1,242	1,049	+18.40%
315	Bayboro	Town	Pamlico		1,242	1,161	+6.98%
316	Lake Waccamaw	Town	Columbus		1,239	1,296	−4.40%
317	Fremont	Town	Wayne		1,237	1,196	+3.43%
318	Robersonville	Town	Martin		1,237	1,269	−2.52%
319	Rutherford College	Town	Burke	Caldwell	1,220	1,226	−0.49%
320	Boonville	Town	Yadkin		1,203	1,185	+1.52%
321	Pinetops	Town	Edgecombe		1,198	1,200	−0.17%
322	Roseboro	Town	Sampson		1,189	1,163	+2.24%
323	Mount Gilead	Town	Montgomery		1,187	1,171	+1.37%
324	Beulaville	Town	Duplin		1,176	1,116	+5.38%
325	Highlands	Town	Macon	Jackson	1,127	1,072	+5.13%
326	Walnut Creek	Village	Wayne		1,119	1,084	+3.23%
327	Dortches	Town	Nash		1,103	1,082	+1.94%
328	North Topsail Beach	Town	Onslow		1,097	1,005	+9.15%
329	Northwest	City	Brunswick		1,096	703	+55.90%
330	Vass	Town	Moore		1,062	952	+11.55%
331	Alamance	Village	Alamance		1,061	988	+7.39%
332	Lucama	Town	Wilson		1,052	1,036	+1.54%
333	Columbus	Town	Polk		1,042	1,060	−1.70%
334	Montreat	Town	Buncombe		1,024	901	+13.65%
335	Stem	Town	Granville		1,023	960	+6.56%
336	Cooleemee	Town	Davie		1,002	940	+6.60%
337	Rhodhiss	Town	Burke	Caldwell	996	997	−0.10%
338	Middlesex	Town	Nash		975	912	+6.91%
339	McAdenville	Town	Gaston		960	890	+7.87%
340	Gaston	Town	Northampton		959	1,008	−4.86%
341	Ocean Isle Beach	Town	Brunswick		940	867	+8.42%
342	Norlina	Town	Warren		924	920	+0.43%
343	Brunswick	Town	Columbus		921	973	−5.34%
344	Holden Beach	Town	Brunswick		916	921	−0.54%
345	Oriental	Town	Pamlico		909	880	+3.30%
346	Rowland	Town	Robeson		906	885	+2.37%
347	Cleveland	Town	Rowan		902	846	+6.62%
348	Vanceboro	Town	Craven		877	869	+0.92%
349	Belwood	Town	Cleveland		876	857	+2.22%
350	Magnolia	Town	Duplin		875	831	+5.29%
351	Garysburg	Town	Northampton		860	904	−4.87%
352	Maysville	Town	Jones		853	818	+4.28%
353	White Lake	Town	Bladen		850	843	+0.83%
354	Ellerbe	Town	Richmond		845	864	−2.20%
355	Faith	Town	Rowan		845	819	+3.17%
356	Red Cross	Town	Stanly		845	762	+10.89%
357	Rich Square	Town	Northampton		835	894	−6.60%
358	Faison	Town	Duplin	Sampson	824	784	+5.10%
359	Star	Town	Montgomery		824	806	+2.23%
360	Candor	Town	Montgomery	Moore	823	813	+1.23%
361	Warrenton	Town	Warren		819	851	−3.76%
362	Kenansville	Town	Duplin		814	770	+5.71%
363	Grover	Town	Cleveland		810	802	+1.00%
364	Peletier	Town	Carteret		803	769	+4.42%
365	Marshall	Town	Madison		802	777	+3.22%
366	Old Fort	Town	McDowell		797	811	−1.73%
367	Stantonsburg	Town	Wilson		778	762	+2.10%
368	Alliance	Town	Pamlico		764	733	+4.23%
369	Rosman	Town	Transylvania		760	701	+8.42%
370	Chocowinity	Town	Beaufort		751	722	+4.02%
371	Ellenboro	Town	Rutherford		738	723	+2.07%
372	Pikeville	Town	Wayne		738	712	+3.65%
373	Fair Bluff	Town	Columbus		737	709	+3.95%
374	Catawba	Town	Catawba		736	702	+4.84%
375	Duck	Town	Dare		736	742	−0.81%
376	Grantsboro	Town	Pamlico		728	692	+5.20%
377	Newland	Town	Avery		728	715	+1.82%
378	Aulander	Town	Bertie		715	763	−6.29%
379	Black Creek	Town	Wilson		708	692	+2.31%
380	Conway	Town	Northampton		707	752	−5.98%
381	Bogue	Town	Carteret		706	695	+1.58%
382	Taylortown	Town	Moore		701	634	+10.57%
383	Sedalia	Town	Guilford		691	676	+2.22%
384	Dobbins Heights	Town	Richmond		685	687	−0.29%
385	Saluda	City	Polk	Henderson	671	631	+6.34%
386	Kingstown	Town	Cleveland		668	656	+1.83%
387	Misenheimer	Village	Stanly		665	650	+2.31%
388	New London	Town	Stanly		664	607	+9.39%
389	Beech Mountain	Town	Watauga	Avery	659	675	−2.37%
390	Wade	Town	Cumberland		653	638	+2.35%
391	East Bend	Town	Yadkin		646	634	+1.89%
392	Whitakers	Town	Nash	Edgecombe	646	627	+3.03%
393	High Shoals	City	Gaston		637	595	+7.06%
394	Fallston	Town	Cleveland		635	627	+1.28%
395	Richfield	Town	Stanly		630	582	+8.25%
396	Garland	Town	Sampson		628	595	+5.55%
397	Harmony	Town	Iredell		619	543	+14.00%
398	Columbia	Town	Tyrrell		613	610	+0.49%
399	Wagram	Town	Scotland		613	615	−0.33%
400	Whitsett	Town	Guilford		606	584	+3.77%
401	Clarkton	Town	Bladen		604	614	−1.63%
402	Greenevers	Town	Duplin		603	567	+6.35%
403	Newton Grove	Town	Sampson		600	585	+2.56%
404	Bailey	Town	Nash		593	568	+4.40%
405	Winton	Town	Hertford		592	629	−5.88%
406	Patterson Springs	Town	Cleveland		590	571	+3.33%
407	Robbinsville	Town	Graham		579	597	−3.02%
408	Lawndale	Town	Cleveland		578	570	+1.40%
409	Ossipee	Town	Alamance		577	536	+7.65%
410	Winfall	Town	Perquimans		575	555	+3.60%
411	Elk Park	Town	Avery		552	542	+1.85%
412	Hot Springs	Town	Madison		548	520	+5.38%
413	Minnesott Beach	Town	Pamlico		544	530	+2.64%
414	Micro	Town	Johnston		537	458	+17.25%
415	Littleton	Town	Halifax		535	559	−4.29%
416	Varnamtown	Town	Brunswick		525	525	0.00%
417	Woodland	Town	Northampton		520	557	−6.64%
418	Polkville	City	Cleveland		516	516	0.00%
419	Parkton	Town	Robeson		514	504	+1.98%
420	Seaboard	Town	Northampton		504	542	−7.01%
421	Topsail Beach	Town	Pender		503	461	+9.11%
422	Teachey	Town	Duplin		500	448	+11.61%
423	Roper	Town	Washington		471	485	−2.89%
424	Hayesville	Town	Clay		470	461	+1.95%
425	Salemburg	Town	Sampson		470	457	+2.84%
426	Bakersville	Town	Mitchell		468	450	+4.00%
427	Lattimore	Town	Cleveland		468	406	+15.27%
428	Ansonville	Town	Anson		461	440	+4.77%
429	Pink Hill	Town	Lenoir		459	451	+1.77%
430	Brookford	Town	Catawba		456	442	+3.17%
431	Gibson	Town	Scotland		455	449	+1.34%
432	Aurora	Town	Beaufort		454	455	−0.22%
433	Sandyfield	Town	Columbus		450	430	+4.65%
434	Bolton	Town	Columbus		448	519	−13.68%
435	Ronda	Town	Wilkes		447	438	+2.05%
436	St. Helena	Village	Pender		434	417	+4.08%
437	Arapahoe	Town	Pamlico		432	416	+3.85%
438	Hoffman	Town	Richmond		426	418	+1.91%
439	East Arcadia	Town	Bladen		423	418	+1.20%
440	Hookerton	Town	Greene		419	413	+1.45%
441	Jamesville	Town	Martin		411	424	−3.07%
442	Jackson	Town	Northampton		410	430	−4.65%
443	Simpson	Village	Pitt		409	390	+4.87%
444	Macclesfield	Town	Edgecombe		408	413	−1.21%
445	Lewiston Woodville	Town	Bertie		405	426	−4.93%
446	Staley	Town	Randolph		405	397	+2.02%
447	Grimesland	Town	Pitt		404	386	+4.66%
448	Lilesville	Town	Anson		398	395	+0.76%
449	Fountain	Town	Pitt		396	385	+2.86%
450	Peachland	Town	Anson		395	390	+1.28%
451	Bunn	Town	Franklin		391	327	+19.57%
452	Webster	Town	Jackson		387	372	+4.03%
453	Falcon	Town	Cumberland County	Sampson	385	324	+18.83%
454	Washington Park	Town	Beaufort		383	392	−2.30%
455	Sugar Mountain	Village	Avery		382	371	+2.96%
456	Caswell Beach	Town	Brunswick		381	395	−3.54%
457	Cove City	Town	Craven		381	378	+0.79%
458	Bethania	Town	Forsyth		367	344	+6.69%
459	Saratoga	Town	Wilson		363	353	+2.83%
460	Bostic	Town	Rutherford		359	355	+1.13%
461	Atkinson	Town	Pender		357	296	+20.61%
462	Dover	Town	Craven		351	349	+0.57%
463	Sims	Town	Wilson		346	275	+25.82%
464	Bridgeton	Town	Craven		345	349	−1.15%
465	Ruth	Town	Rutherford		345	347	−0.58%
466	Calypso	Town	Duplin		340	327	+3.98%
467	Stovall	Town	Granville		333	324	+2.78%
468	Morven	Town	Anson		331	329	+0.61%
469	Forest Hills	Village	Jackson		325	303	+7.26%
470	Waco	Town	Cleveland		316	310	+1.94%
471	Seven Devils	Town	Watauga	Avery	314	313	+0.32%
472	Casar	Town	Cleveland		309	305	+1.31%
473	Cedar Rock	Village	Caldwell		302	301	+0.33%
474	Hamilton	Town	Martin		297	306	−2.94%
475	Mooresboro	Town	Cleveland		297	293	+1.37%
476	Rennert	Town	Robeson		294	275	+6.91%
477	Castalia	Town	Nash		280	264	+6.06%
478	Sandy Creek	Town	Brunswick		280	248	+12.90%
479	Bald Head Island	Village	Brunswick		279	268	+4.10%
480	Pollocksville	Town	Jones		276	268	+2.99%
481	Bolivia	Town	Brunswick		271	149	+81.88%
482	Cameron	Town	Moore		270	244	+10.66%
483	Goldston	Town	Chatham		268	234	+14.53%
484	Dublin	Town	Bladen		267	267	0.00%
485	Oak City	Town	Martin		266	266	0.00%
486	Momeyer	Town	Nash		261	277	−5.78%
487	Gatesville	Town	Gates		260	267	−2.62%
488	Cofield	Village	Hertford		258	267	−3.37%
489	Hobgood	Town	Halifax		256	268	−4.48%
490	Trenton	Town	Jones		251	238	+5.46%
491	Seagrove	Town	Randolph		248	235	+5.53%
492	Parmele	Town	Martin		246	243	+1.23%
493	Bath	Town	Beaufort		243	245	−0.82%
494	Crossnore	Town	Avery		238	143	+66.43%
	East Laurinburg	Town	Scotland			234	
495	Indian Beach	Town	Carteret		231	223	+3.59%
496	Turkey	Town	Sampson		227	213	+6.57%
497	Watha	Town	Pender		226	181	+24.86%
498	Dillsboro	Town	Jackson		217	213	+1.88%
	Eureka	Town	Wayne			214	
499	Earl	Town	Cleveland		211	198	+6.57%
500	Stonewall	Town	Pamlico		209	214	−2.34%
501	Kelford	Town	Bertie		204	203	+0.49%
502	Conetoe	Town	Edgecombe		201	198	+1.52%
503	Creswell	Town	Washington		200	207	−3.38%
504	Colerain	Town	Bertie		198	217	−8.76%
505	Walstonburg	Town	Greene		198	193	+2.59%
506	Vandemere	Town	Pamlico		197	246	−19.92%
507	Danbury	Town	Stokes		187	189	−1.06%
508	Love Valley	Town	Iredell		183	154	+18.83%
509	Powellsville	Town	Bertie		180	189	−4.76%
510	Severn	Town	Northampton		177	191	−7.33%
511	Milton	Town	Caswell		176	155	+13.55%
512	Roxobel	Town	Bertie		176	187	−5.88%
513	Askewville	Town	Bertie		171	184	−7.07%
514	Autryville	Town	Sampson		171	167	+2.40%
515	Harrells	Town	Sampson	Duplin	169	160	+5.62%
516	Boardman	Town	Columbus		163	166	−1.81%
517	Pantego	Town	Beaufort		161	164	−1.83%
518	Godwin	Town	Cumberland		159	128	+24.22%
519	Halifax	Town	Halifax		157	170	−7.65%
520	Cerro Gordo	Town	Columbus		144	131	+9.92%
521	Everetts	Town	Martin		144	150	−4.00%
522	Mesic	Town	Pamlico		143	144	−0.69%
523	Linden	Town	Cumberland		139	136	+2.21%
524	Lansing	Town	Ashe		128	126	+1.59%
525	Kittrell	Town	Vance		127	132	−3.79%
526	Chimney Rock	Village	Rutherford		126	140	−10.00%
527	Proctorville	Town	Robeson		122	121	+0.83%
528	Marietta	Town	Robeson		111	111	0.00%
529	Macon	Town	Warren		104	110	−5.45%
530	Norman	Town	Richmond		99	100	−1.00%
531	Middleburg	Town	Vance		98	101	−2.97%
532	Grandfather	Village	Avery		97	95	+2.11%
533	McFarlan	Town	Anson		96	94	+2.13%
534	McDonald	Town	Robeson		95	94	+1.06%
535	Tar Heel	Town	Bladen		91	90	+1.11%
536	Bear Grass	Town	Martin		81	89	−8.99%
537	Harrellsville	Town	Hertford		80	85	−5.88%
538	Lumber Bridge	Town	Robeson		80	82	−2.44%
539	Speed	Town	Edgecombe		66	63	+4.76%
540	Raynham	Town	Robeson		64	60	+6.67%
541	Como	Town	Hertford		61	67	−8.96%
542	Orrum	Town	Robeson		61	59	+3.39%
543	Seven Springs	Town	Wayne		59	55	+7.27%
544	Lasker	Town	Northampton		58	64	−9.37%
545	Falkland	Town	Pitt		51	47	+8.51%
546	Hassell	Town	Martin		47	49	−4.08%
547	Lake Santeetlah	Town	Graham		44	38	+15.79%
548	Leggett	Town	Edgecombe		37	37	0.00%
549	Fontana Dam	Town	Graham		10	13	−23.08%
	Dellview	Town	Gaston			6	
	Spencer Mountain	Town	Gaston			0	

== See also ==
- North Carolina statistical areas
- List of counties in North Carolina
- List of census-designated places in North Carolina
- List of unincorporated communities in North Carolina

== Images ==
Notable incorporated cities in North Carolina

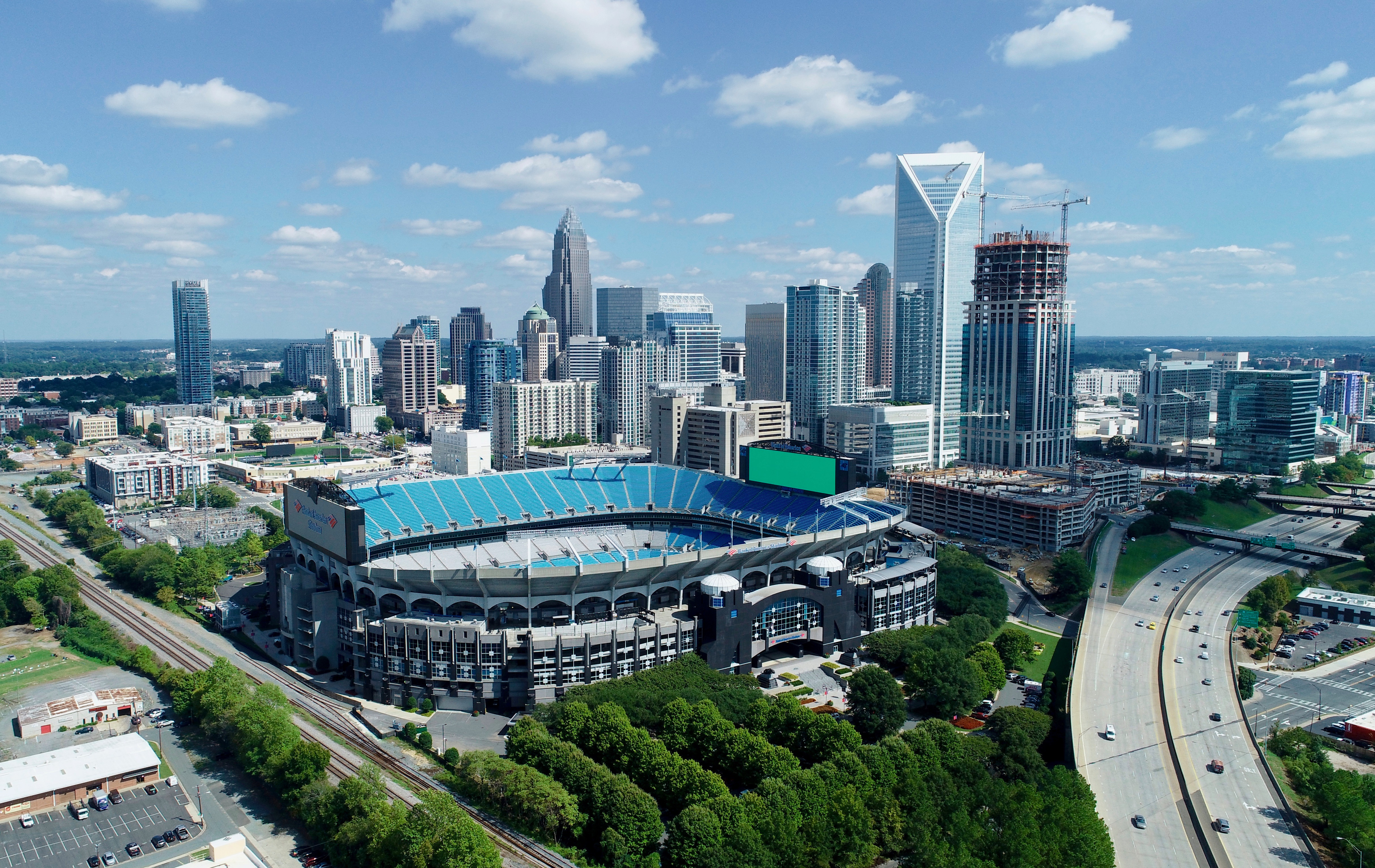
Charlotte, most populous city in North Carolina

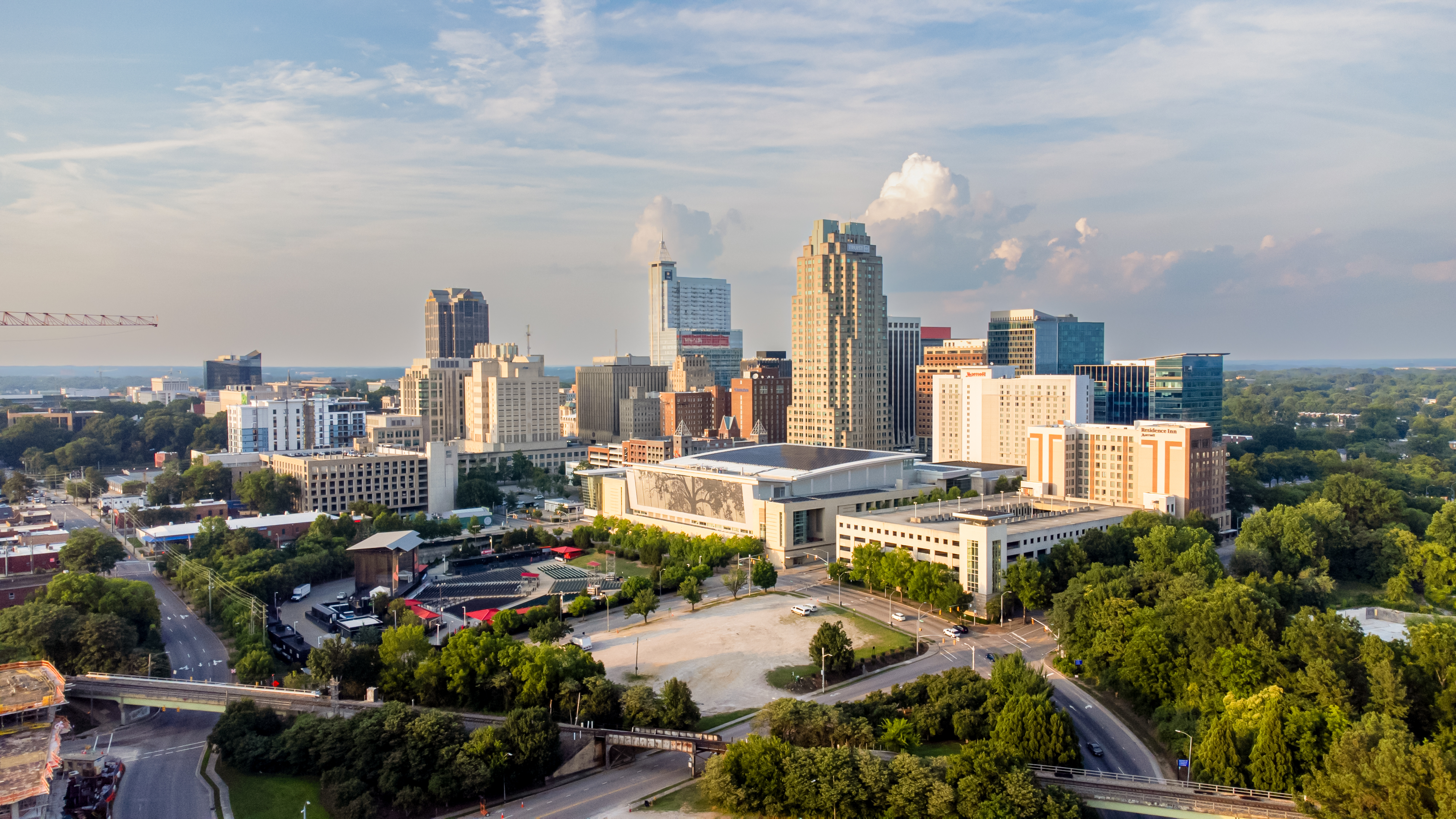
Raleigh, the capital of North Carolina and its second most populous city

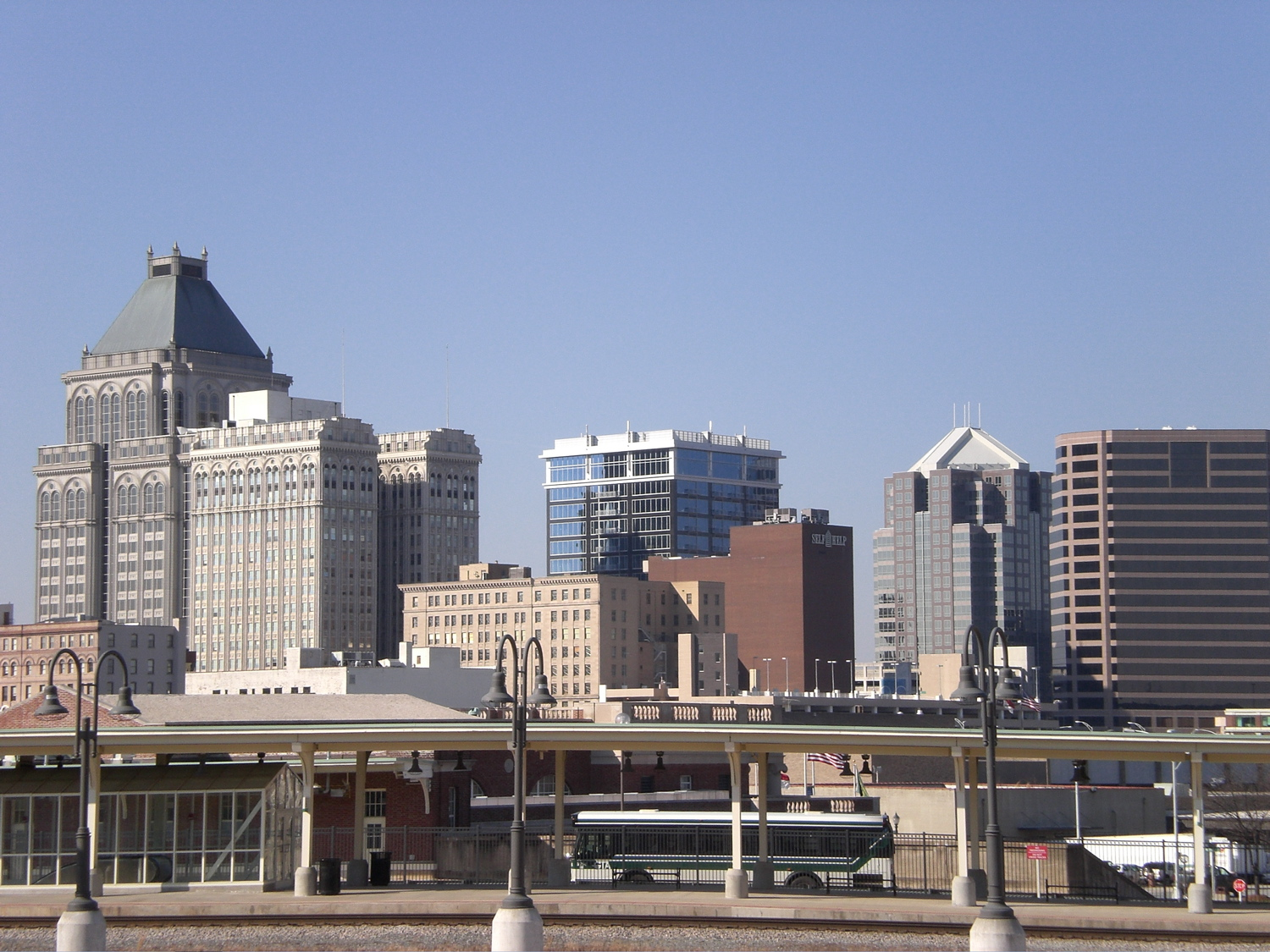
Greensboro, the third most populous city

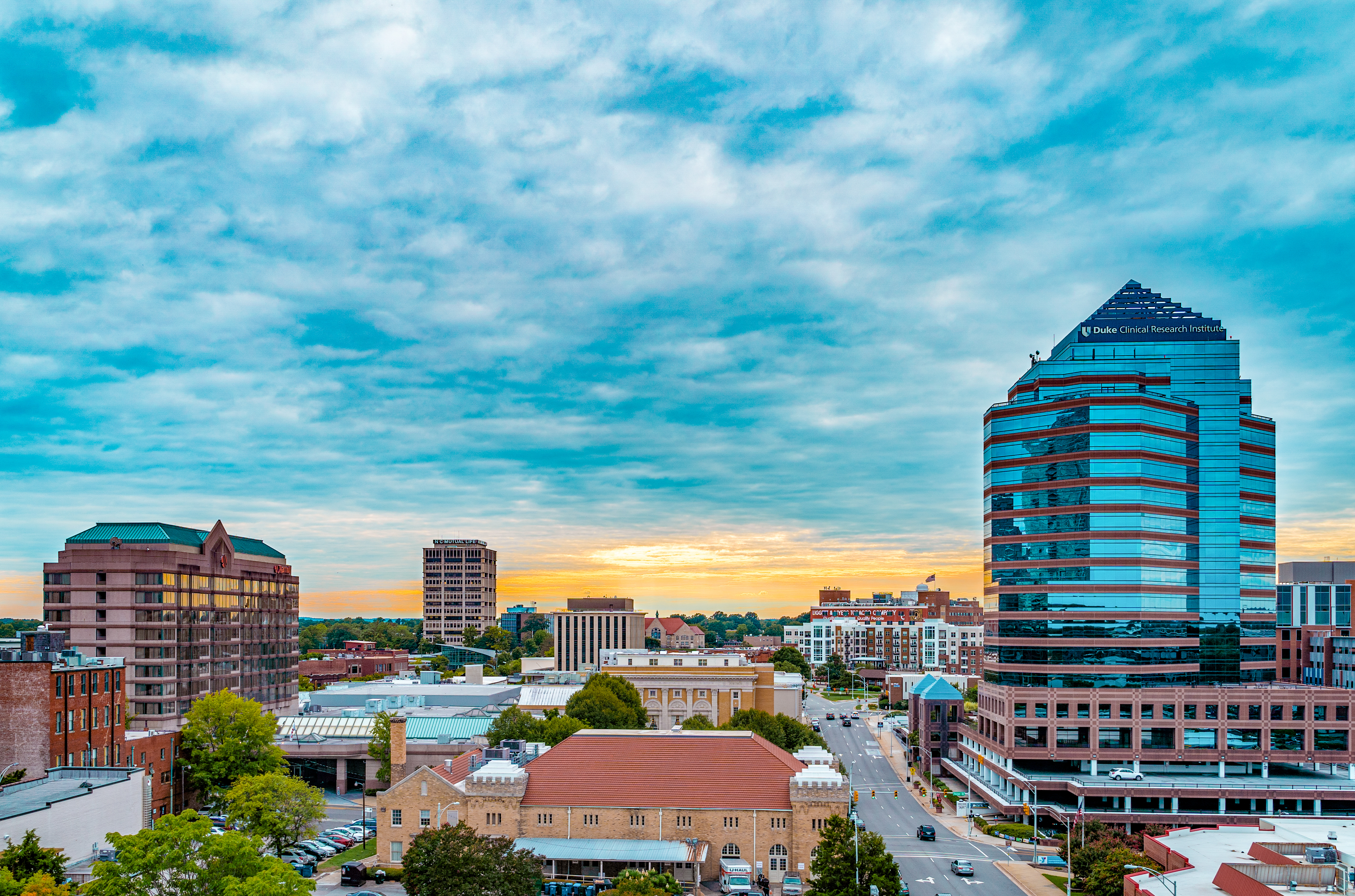
Durham, the fourth most populous city

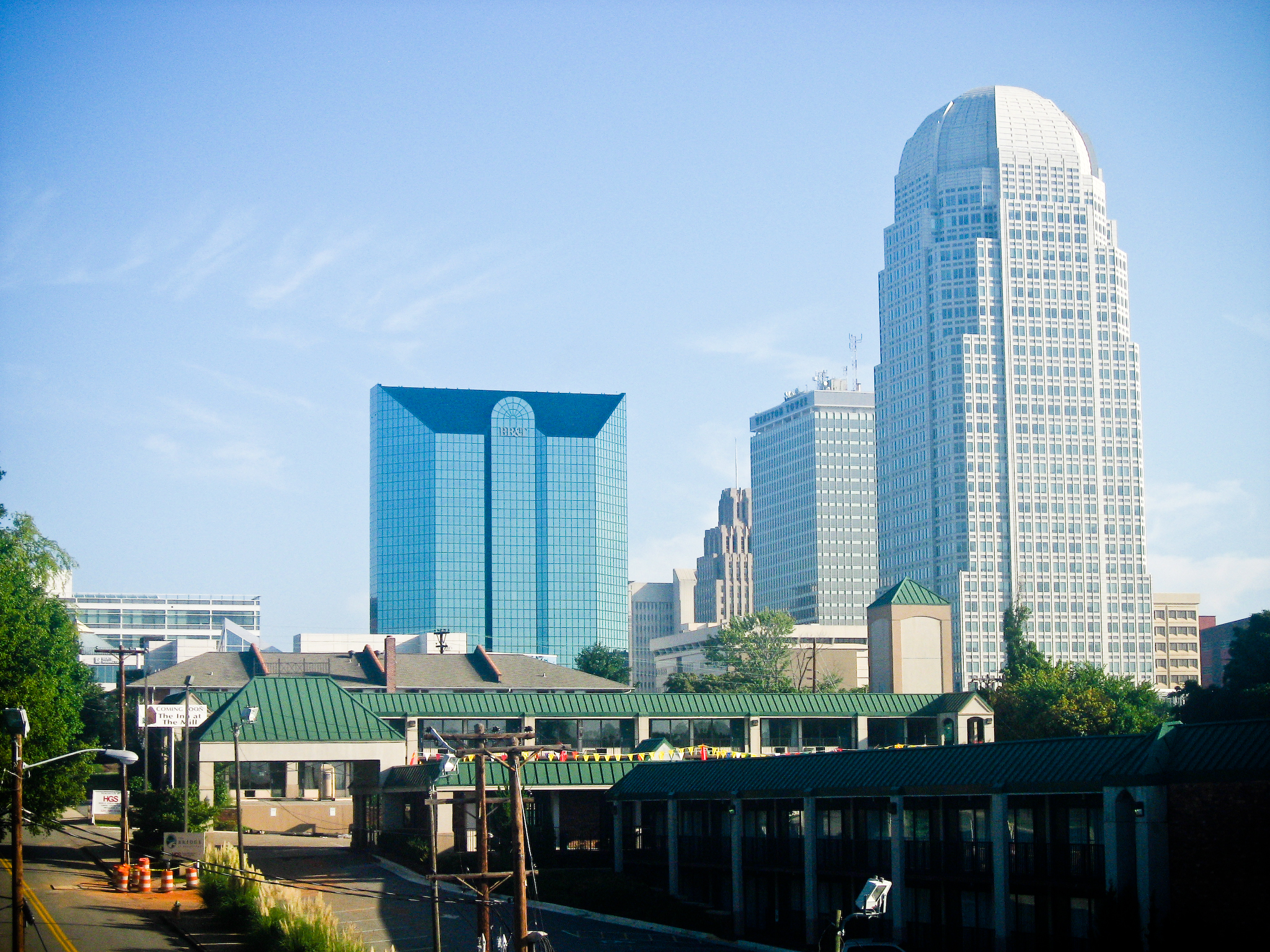
Winston-Salem, the fifth most populous city

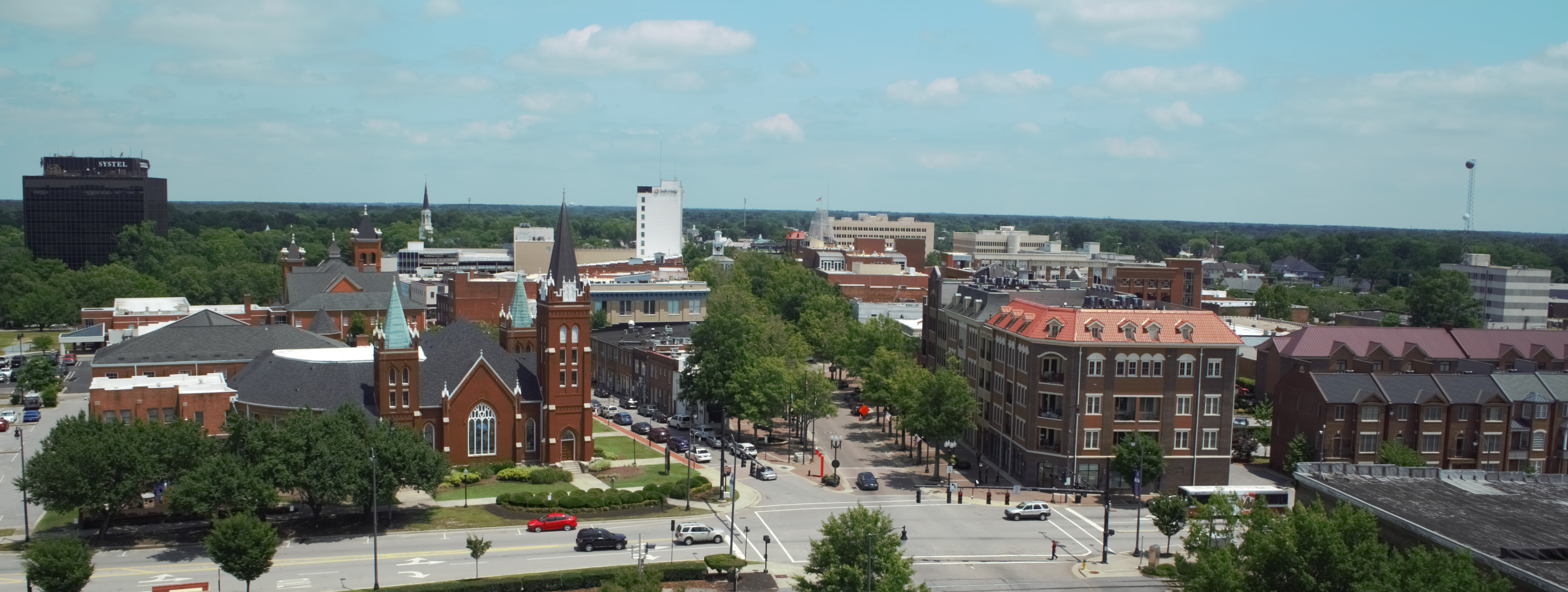
Fayetteville, the sixth most populous city

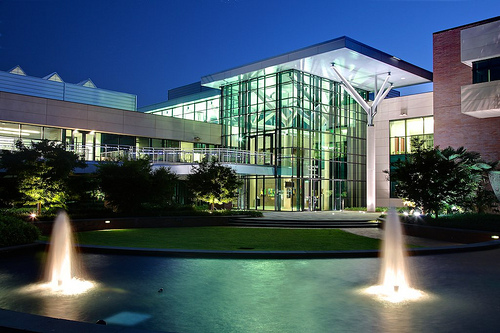
Cary, the seventh most populous city

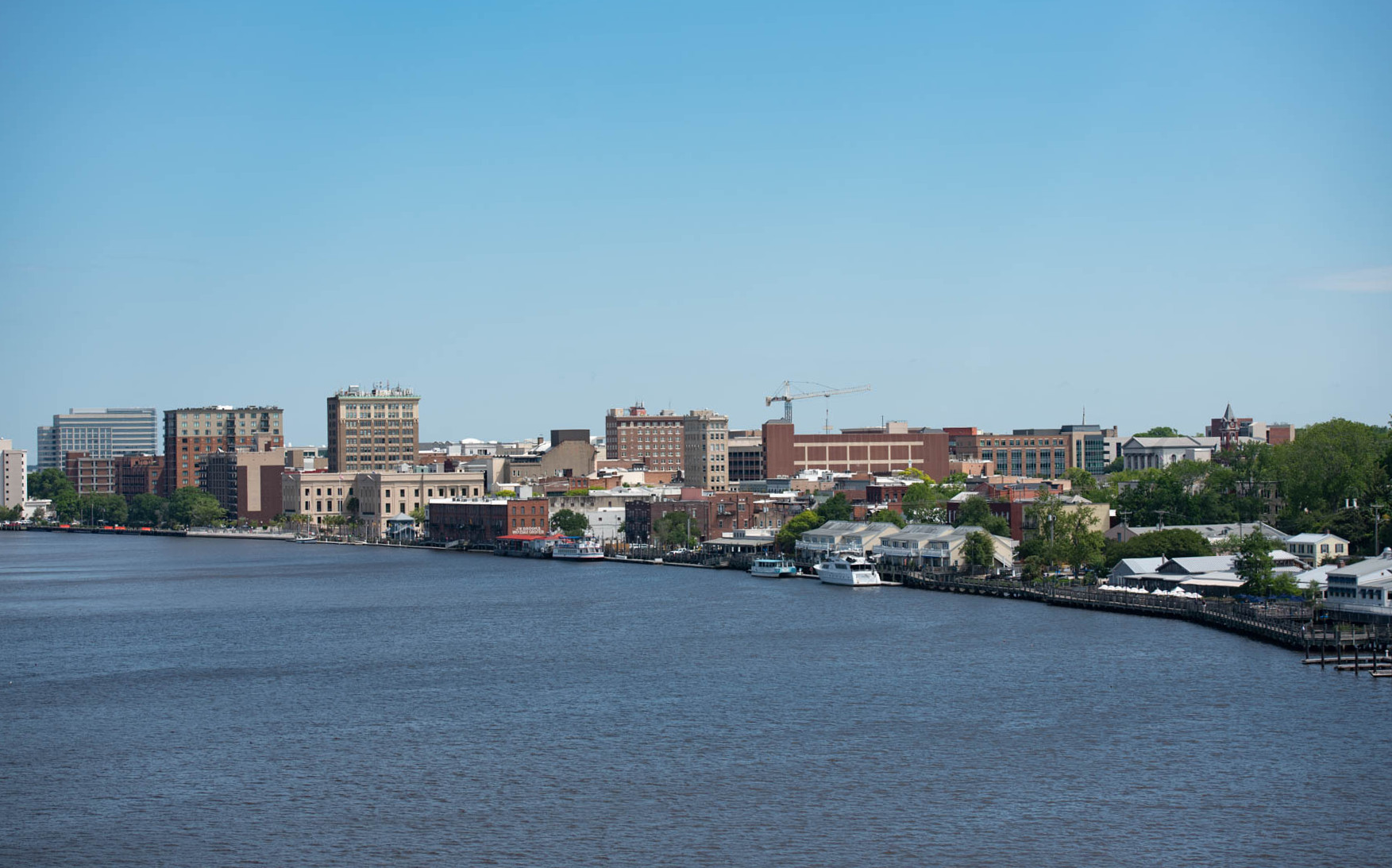
Wilmington, the eighth most populous city

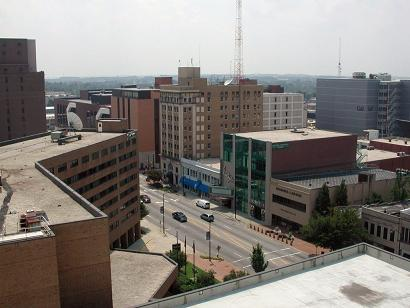
High Point, the ninth most populous city

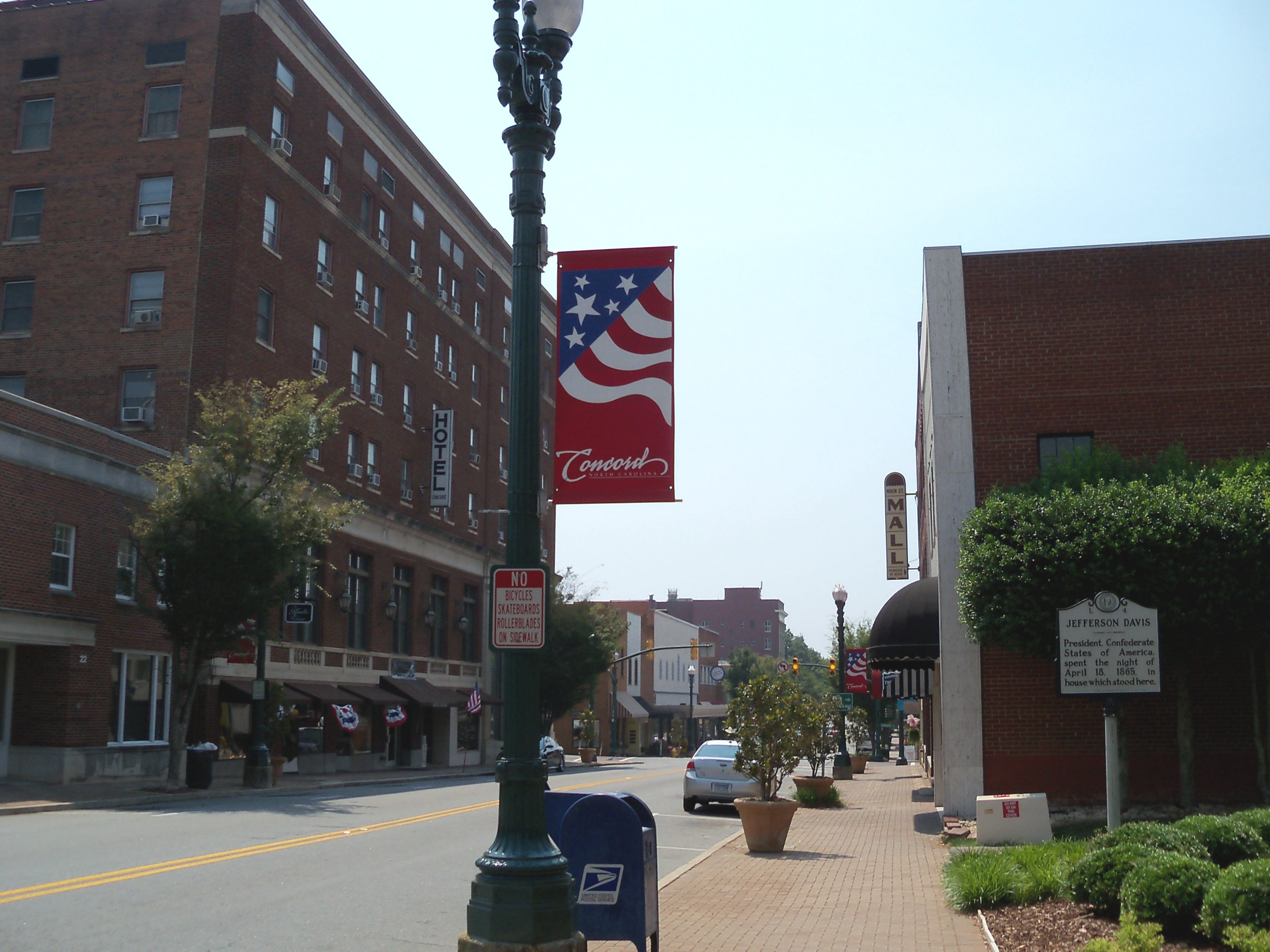
Concord, the tenth most populous city
