= North Carolina Highway 307 =

State highway in Pamlico County, North Carolina, US

North Carolina Highway 307
- Pennsylvania Avenue

Route information
- Maintained by NCDOT
- Length: 1.4 mi (2.3 km)
- Existed: 1930–present

Major junctions
- West end: NC 304 in Hollyville
- East end: 1st Street in Vandemere

Location
- Country: United States
- State: North Carolina
- Counties: Pamlico

Highway system
- North Carolina Highway System; Interstate; US; State; Scenic
← NC 306	→ NC 308

North Carolina Highway 307 (NC 307) is a primary state highway in the U.S. state of North Carolina. It serves as a spur from NC 304 into Vandemere.

== Route description ==
NC 307 is a short 1.4-mile (2.3 km) two-lane road that connects the town of Vandemere with NC 304, at Hollyville (a.k.a. Cash Corner). The highway goes through the town's residential area before ending on 1st Street near the Bay River.

== History ==
NC 307 was established in 1930 as a renumbering part of NC 304; little has changed since.

== Junction List ==
The entire route is in Pamlico County.

Location	mi	km	Destinations	Notes
Hollyville	0.0	0.0	NC 304 – Bayboro, Mesic, Hobucken	
Vandemere	1.4	2.3	1st Street	
1.000 mi = 1.609 km; 1.000 km = 0.621 mi
