= North Carolina Highway 304 =

State highway in Pamlico County, North Carolina, US

North Carolina Highway 304

Route information
- Maintained by NCDOT
- Length: 15.2 mi (24.5 km)
- Existed: 1923–present

Major junctions
- South end: NC 55 in Bayboro
- North end: NC 33 / Hobucken School Road in Hobucken

Location
- Country: United States
- State: North Carolina
- Counties: Pamlico

Highway system
- North Carolina Highway System; Interstate; US; State; Scenic
← US 301	→ NC 305

North Carolina Highway 304 (NC 304) is a primary state highway in the U.S. state of North Carolina. The two-lane coastal highway is 15.2-mile-long (24.5 km) and connects Bayboro with communities in northeastern Pamlico County.

== Route description ==
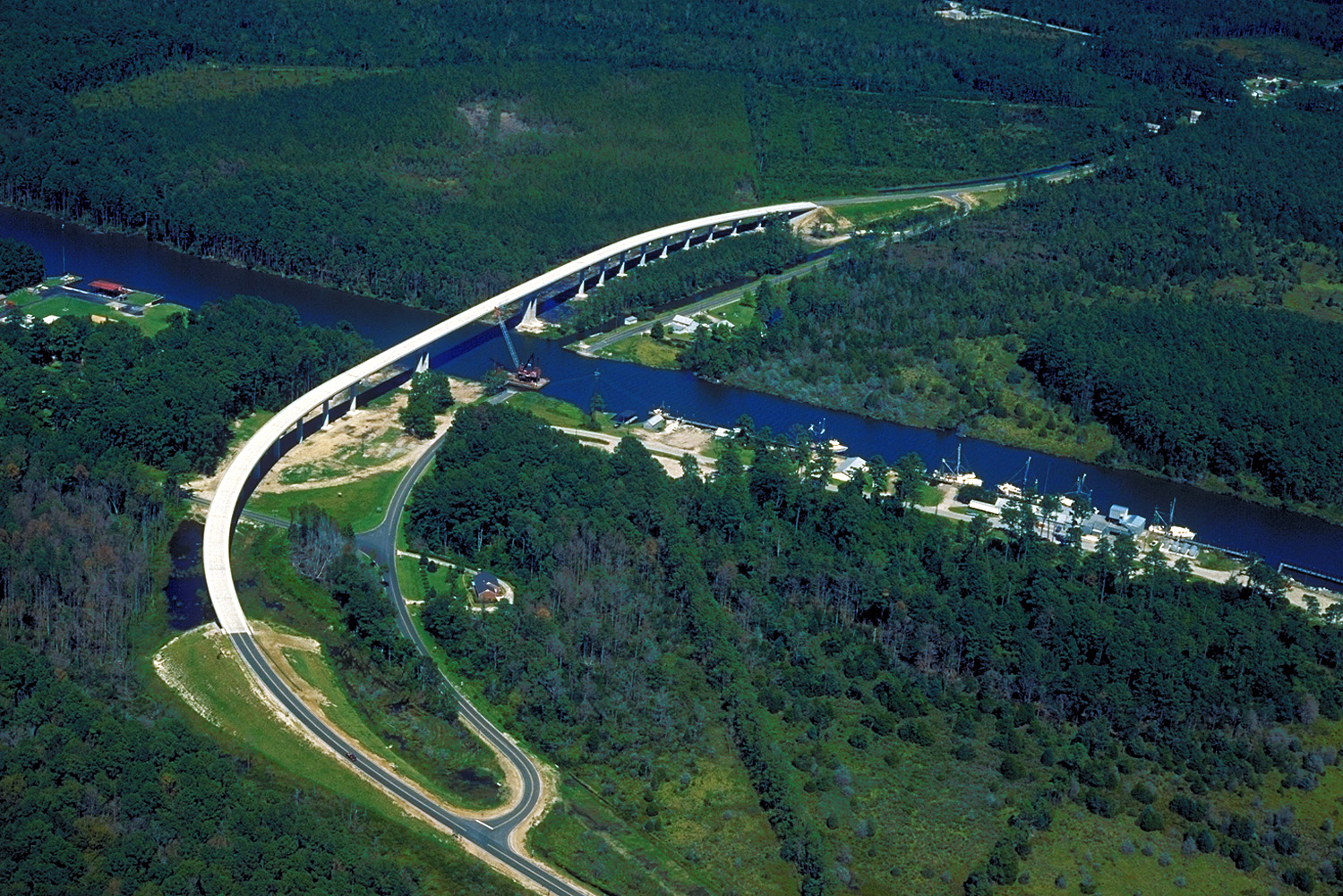
Hobucken Bridge over the Intracoastal Waterway

NC 304 begins in the center of Bayboro, in front of the main courthouse and offices of Pamlico County at NC 55. NC 304, which is known as Vandemere Road in the town, branches off at a skew; the intersection is designed such that southbound NC 304 cannot turn left onto eastbound NC 55 but the connection can easily be made via other local roads. Briefly passing through some residential neighborhoods of the town, the highway heads northeast through agricultural lands and woodlands of the eastern side of the county.

At the unincorporated community of Hollyville, NC 307 heads east to serve the town of Vandemere while NC 304 bends to the north and the east to enter the town of Mesic. Northeast of Mesic in the Goose Creek Game Lands, NC 33 joins NC 304 to form a concurrency for the remainder of both routes' lengths. The two roads cross the Intracoastal Waterway on a high-level bridge before descending into the census-designated place of Hobucken. The road heads through the mostly-residential community before the two signed highways end at the intersection of Hobucken School Road. Ahead, the road continues as SR 1228 first as a paved road, but later a dirt road as it heads through the swamplands near Pamlico Sound.

== History ==
Established in 1923 as a new primary routing, it ran from NC 302, in Bayboro, to end in Vandemere. In 1930, NC 304 was rerouted and extended northeast from Vandemere to its current eastern terminus in Hobucken; its old alignment into Vandemere becoming NC 307. Between 1948 and 1950, NC 33 was extended east to Hobucken as well, overlapping with NC 304 for 1.5 miles (2.4 km). In 1997, the Hobucken bridge was constructed over the Intracoastal Waterway, replacing an old swing-style drawbridge; part of its old alignment was replaced by NC 33, while the remainder became secondary roads.

== Junction list ==
The entire route is in Pamlico County.

Location	mi	km	Destinations	Notes
Bayboro	0.0	0.0	NC 55 – Grantsboro, New Bern, Oriental	Southern terminus
Hollyville	6.1	9.8	NC 307 east (Pennsylvania Avenue) – Vandemere	Western terminus of NC 307
	13.6	21.9	NC 33 west – Aurora	West end of NC 33 overlap
Hobucken	15.2	24.5	NC 33 ends / Hobucken School Road	East end of NC 33 overlap
1.000 mi = 1.609 km; 1.000 km = 0.621 mi: Concurrency terminus
