= North Carolina Highway 33 =

State highway in North Carolina, US

North Carolina Highway 33

- Route of NC 33 highlighted in red

Route information
- Maintained by NCDOT
- Length: 109.6 mi (176.4 km)
- Existed: 1929–present

Major junctions
- West end: NC 4 / NC 48 near Red Oak
- I-95 near Whitakers; US 301 in Whitakers; US 258 in Princeville; US 64 at Princeville; US 264 west of Greenville; US 13 in Greenville; US 264 Alt. east of Greenville; US 17 in Chocowinity
- East end: NC 304 / Hobucken School Road in Hobucken

Location
- Country: United States
- State: North Carolina
- Counties: Nash, Edgecombe, Pitt, Beaufort, Pamlico

Highway system
- North Carolina Highway System; Interstate; US; State; Scenic
← NC 32	→ NC 34

North Carolina Highway 33 (NC 33) is a primary state highway in the U.S. state of North Carolina. Spanning a distance of 110 miles (180 km), the east–west route passes through many small towns and communities in Eastern North Carolina's Inner Banks. It bypasses a large portion of the cities of Rocky Mount and Greenville, and goes through central Tarboro.

== Route description ==
=== Rocky Mount area ===
NC 33 starts at NC 4/NC 48 near Red Oak, located east of Whitakers, when NC 33 reaches Whitakers, it turns north with US 301 and then turns east crossing the railroad tracks and then enters Edgecombe County.

=== Tarboro area ===
When NC 33 leaves Whitakers, it meets a junction with NC 97 in a small town called Leggett on its way to Tarboro, when NC 33 reaches Tarboro it turns left running east, as NC 33 crosses the Tar River, it enters Princeville, than meets a junction with US 258 and NC 111, and follows it going east, when NC 33 leaves Princeville, it runs south, and meets a junction with US 64 (exit 487).

=== Greenville area ===
In Pitt County, NC 33 meets a junction with the eastern terminus of NC 222 in Belvoir on its way to Greenville, as it crosses US 264 (exit 77), when it reaches Greenville it turns into Belvoir Highway, until it reaches US 13/NC 11/NC 903, when it reaches US 13/NC 11/NC 903, it runs south with them being Memorial Drive, and then loops south to Greene Street leaving US 13/NC 11/NC 903. When NC 33 reaches US 264 again, it meets a junction of US 264 Alternate's eastern terminus, and loops south with it as Greenville Boulevard, when NC 33 runs east leaving Greenville, it passes through a road junction with Blackjack-Simpson Road bypassing Simpson on its way to Grimesland, after leaving Grimesland, it meets a road junction with Grimes Farm Road on its way to Beaufort County, when NC 33 bypasses Grimes Farm Road again, it enters Beaufort County, and then meets a road junction with Godley Road.

=== Pamlico area ===
In Beaufort County when NC 33 reaches Chocowinity where it has a junction with US 17, via its mainline route and business route. NC 33 leaves Chocowinity as it downgrades to a rural road on its way to Aurora. Right before when NC 33 reaches Aurora, it meets a junction with NC 306, and runs east together until they reach Aurora. When the two routes both reach Aurora, NC 306 turns left going north, and NC 33 goes straight running east. After NC 33 leaves Aurora it enters Pamlico County, and loops south. When NC 33 reaches NC 304 it runs south with it until it reaches Hobucken. When they both reach Hobucken, they end together at Hobucken School Road.

== History ==
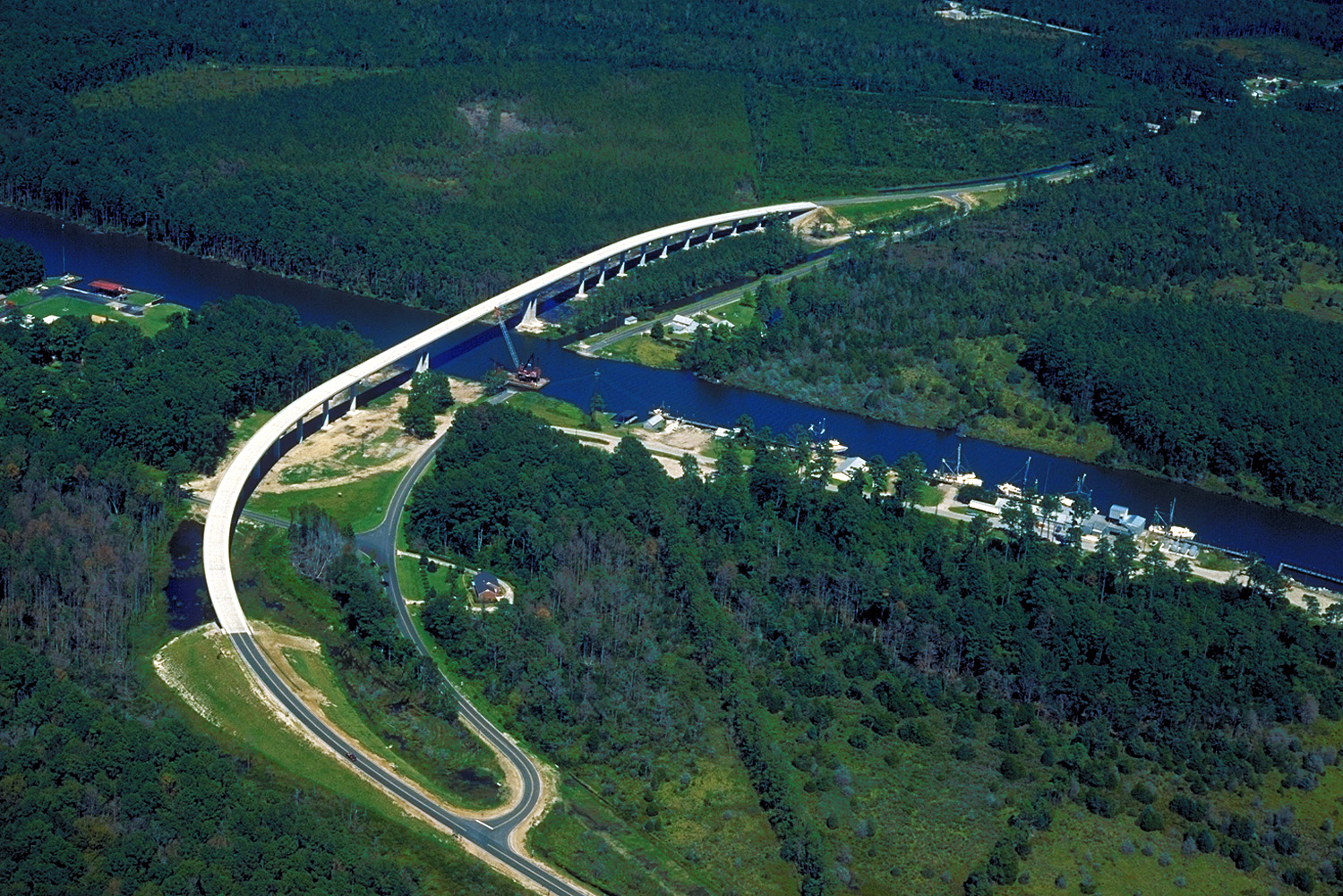
The bridge to Hobucken

NC 33 was first created in 1929 or 1930 as a spur of parent route NC 30 that ran from Chocowinity to Aurora. It was extended between 1936 and 1938 through Washington as an alternative routing to NC 11. Around 1948–1953, the route's eastern terminus was moved to its current location at Hobucken. Throughout the 1970s, NC 33 was moved in the Washington area and extended through Greenville, taking the place of the old US 264 and NC 30 alignments in the area. In 1994, the final extension occurred during the Tarboro renumbering; the new alignment passed through Tarboro and then picked up the former NC 44's routing through Whitakers to end at NC 4/NC 48.

== Major intersections ==
County	Location	mi	km	Destinations	Notes
Nash	Whitakers	0.0	0.0	NC 4 / NC 48 – Rocky Mount, Brinkleyville	Western terminus
Nash	Whitakers	0.3	0.48	I-95 – Rocky Mount, Roanoke Rapids	Diamond interchange; I-95 exit 150
Nash	Whitakers	5.3	8.5	US 301 south (White Street) – Fayetteville, Rocky Mount	North end of US 301 overlap
Nash	Whitakers	5.5	8.9	US 301 south (White Street) – Enfield	South end of US 301 overlap
Edgecombe	Leggett	18.8	30.3	NC 97 – Rocky Mount, Hobgood	
Edgecombe	Princeville	26.4	42.5	US 258 / US 64 Alt. / NC 111 / NC 122 – Fountain, Scotland Neck, Speed, Saratoga	West end of US 64 Alt overlap
Edgecombe	Princeville	27.4	44.1	US 64 Alt. east – Bethel	East end of US 64 Alt overlap
Edgecombe	Princeville	27.8	44.7	US 64 – Rocky Mount, Williamston	Diamond interchange
Edgecombe	Old Sparta	33.3	53.6	NC 42 – Pinetops, Conetoe	
Pitt	Belvoir	40.9	65.8	NC 222 west – Falkland	Eastern terminus of NC 222
Pitt	Greenville	45.3	72.9	US 264 / NC 11 Byp. (Martin Luther King Highway) – Farmville, Washington	Diamond interchange
Pitt	Greenville	48.7	78.4	US 13 north / NC 11 north / NC 903 north (Memorial Drive) – Bethel, Stokes	North end of US 13 / NC 11 / NC 903 overlaps
Pitt	Greenville	49.0	78.9	US 13 south / NC 11 south / NC 903 south (Memorial Drive) – Snow Hill, Ayden	South end of US 13 / NC 11 / NC 903 overlaps
Pitt	Greenville	52.3	84.2	US 264 / US 264 Alt. – Farmville, Washington	West end of US 264 Alt. overlap
Pitt	Greenville	54.2	87.2	US 264 Alt. west (Greenville Boulevard)	East end of US 264 Alt. overlap
Beaufort	Chocowinity	70.0	112.7	US 17 Bus. – New Bern, Washington	
Beaufort	Chocowinity	70.6	113.6	US 17 – New Bern, Washington	Partial cloverleaf interchange
Beaufort	Aurora	91.7	147.6	NC 306 south – Grantsboro	South end of NC 306 overlap
Beaufort	Aurora	94.9	152.7	NC 306 north – Bayview	North end of NC 306 overlap
Pamlico		108.1	174.0	NC 304 south – Mesic	South end of NC 304 overlap
Pamlico	Hobucken	109.6	176.4	NC 304 ends / Hobucken School Road	North end of NC 304 overlap
1.000 mi = 1.609 km; 1.000 km = 0.621 mi: Concurrency terminus

== See also ==
- North Carolina Bicycle Route 2 - concurrent with NC 33 from Old Sparta (NC 42) to Belvoir Crossroads
- North Carolina Bicycle Route 3 - concurrent with NC 33 along the NC 306 concurrency
