= Lowland, North Carolina =

- Unincorporated community
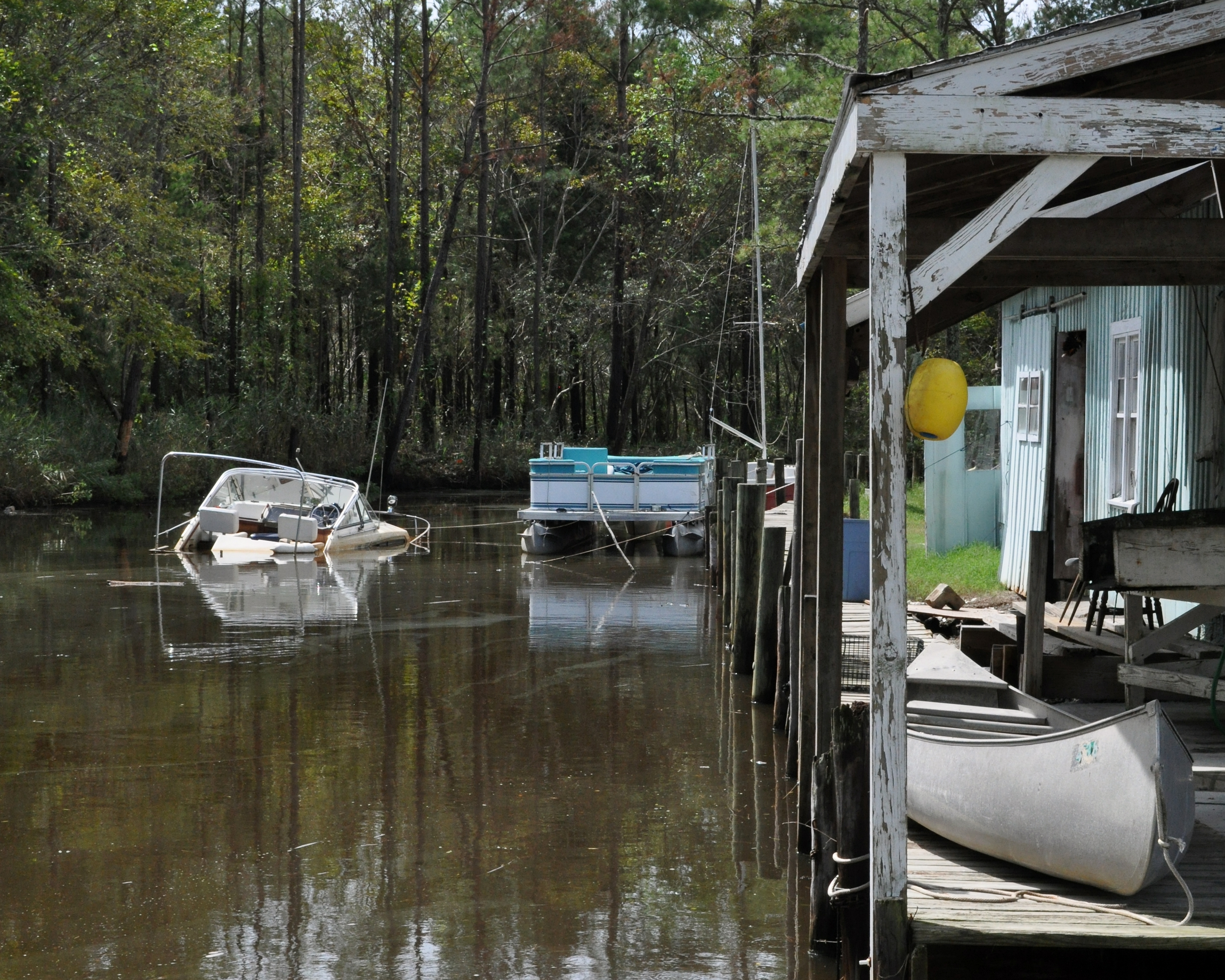
- Lowland during Hurricane Irene in 2011

- Location within North Carolina Location within the United States
- Coordinates: 35°17′57″N 76°33′52″W
- Country: United States
- State: North Carolina
- County: Pamlico
- Elevation: 3 ft (0.91 m)
- Time zone: UTC-5 (Eastern (EST))
  - Summer (DST): UTC-4 (EDT)
- ZIP code: 28552
- Area code: 252
- GNIS feature ID: 989109

Lowland is an unincorporated community in Pamlico County, North Carolina, United States. The community is located in the far northeastern part of the county near Pamlico Sound, 16 miles (26 km) northeast of Bayboro. Lowland has a post office with ZIP code 28552, which opened on November 17, 1884.
