= W. T. Caho =

American lawyer and politician

William T. Caho was a lawyer, public official, and state legislator in North Carolina.

He was born in New Bern, North Carolina. He edited a newspaper. He served in the North Carolina Senate during the 1876 - 1877 term.

He was a sergeant in the Confederate Army. He had a wife.

In 1884, he was listed as a lawyer in Stonewall, North Carolina. He published the Pamlico Enterprise in Bayboro.

He received an appointment as president of a railroad's board of directors. He served as president of a railroad and sued it for advertising and employment payments he alleged he never received.
