= Pamlico County, North Carolina =

County in North Carolina, United States

- County
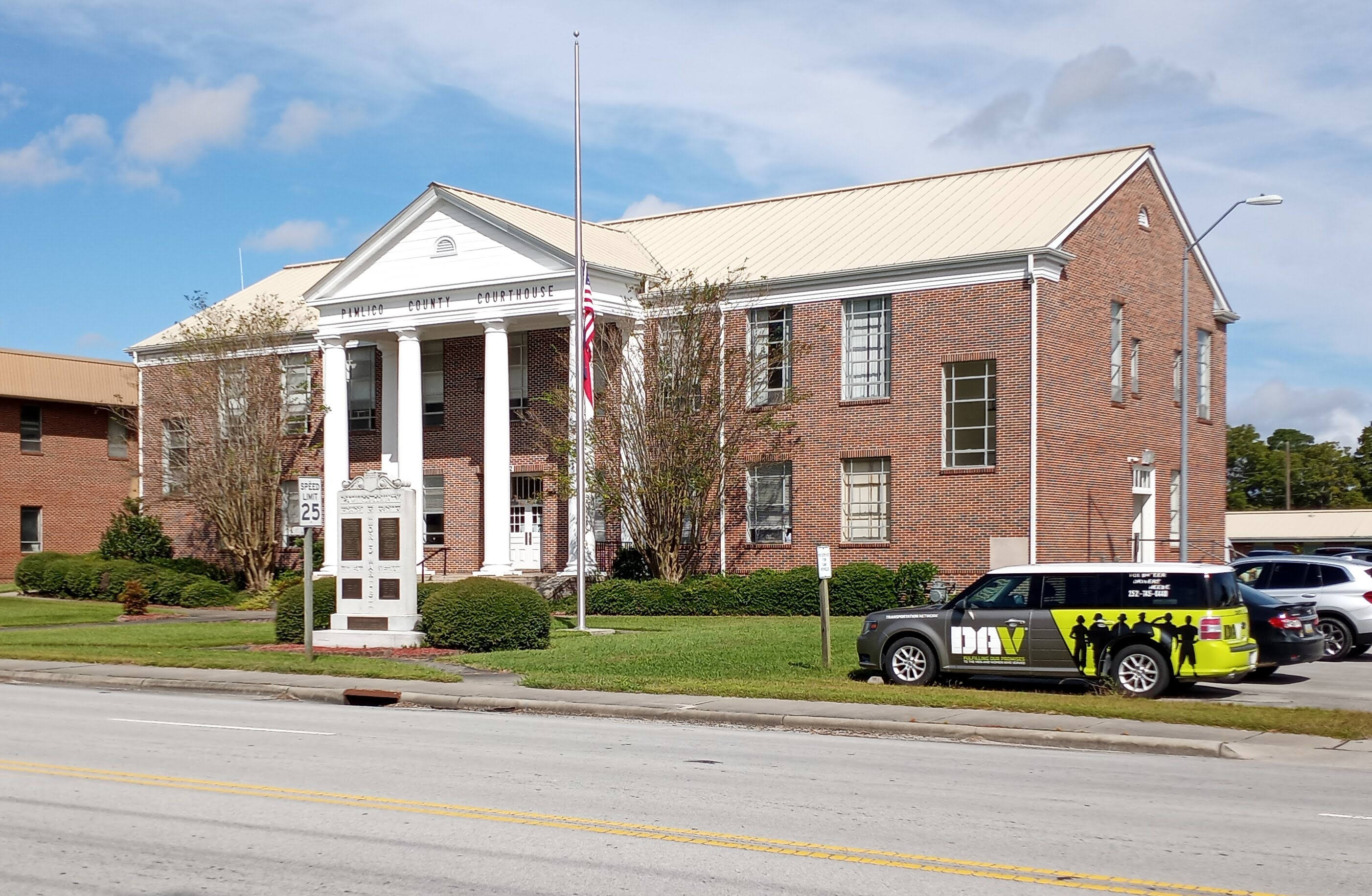
- Pamlico County Courthouse in Bayboro

- Seal

- Location within the U.S. state of North Carolina
- Coordinates: 35.15°N 76.67°W
- Country: United States
- State: North Carolina
- Founded: 1872
- Named for: Pamlico Sound
- Seat: Bayboro
- Largest community: Bayboro

Area
  - Total: 561.63 sq mi (1,454.6 km^{2})
  - Land: 336.52 sq mi (871.6 km^{2})
  - Water: 225.11 sq mi (583.0 km^{2}) 40.08%

Population (2020)
  - Total: 12,276
  - Estimate (2025): 12,758 ▲
  - Density: 36.45/sq mi (14.07/km^{2})
- Time zone: UTC−5 (Eastern)
  - Summer (DST): UTC−4 (EDT)
- Congressional district: 3rd
- Website: www.pamlicocounty.org

Pamlico County (/ˈpæmlɪkoʊ/ PAM-lik-oh) is a county located in the U.S. state of North Carolina. As of the 2020 census, the population was 12,276. Its county seat is Bayboro. Pamlico County is part of the New Bern, NC Micropolitan Statistical Area.

== History ==
The area eventually comprising Pamlico County was first settled by European colonists in the early 1700s. As its swampy land proved hostile to agriculture, population would grow slowly, with early residents relying heavily on the naval stores trade. The first communities coalesced in the early 1800s. The area experienced economic growth during the Reconstruction era.

Pamlico County was formed by the North Carolina General Assembly in 1872 from eastern portions of Beaufort and Craven counties to further their political interests. It was named for the Pamlico Sound, which adjoins it, which itself was named for a Native American tribe. According to David Leroy Corbitt, the county court convened at a store Vandemere until 1876, when the town of Bayboro was designated the county seat. Historian Joe Mobley states that the court's location varied until Bayboro was designated. Portions of Beaufort County were annexed by Pamlico in 1874, 1875, and 1891, while a portion of Craven was annexed in 1875. The county court met in rented facilities in Bayboro until the county's first purpose built courthouse was constructed in 1893. The present courthouse was built by the Works Progress Administration in 1939.

The completion of the Pamlico, Oriental & Western Railroad connecting New Bern in Craven County and the Pamlico town of Oriental in 1906 facilitated county growth. The county is anchored on the east by Oriental, a popular waystation for boaters traveling the Intracoastal Waterway, and by unincorporated Lowland. New Bern across the county line in Craven County to the west, is the primary trade area for Pamlico County. The unincorporated community of Olympia is in the western portion of the county.

== Geography ==
Interactive map of Pamlico County

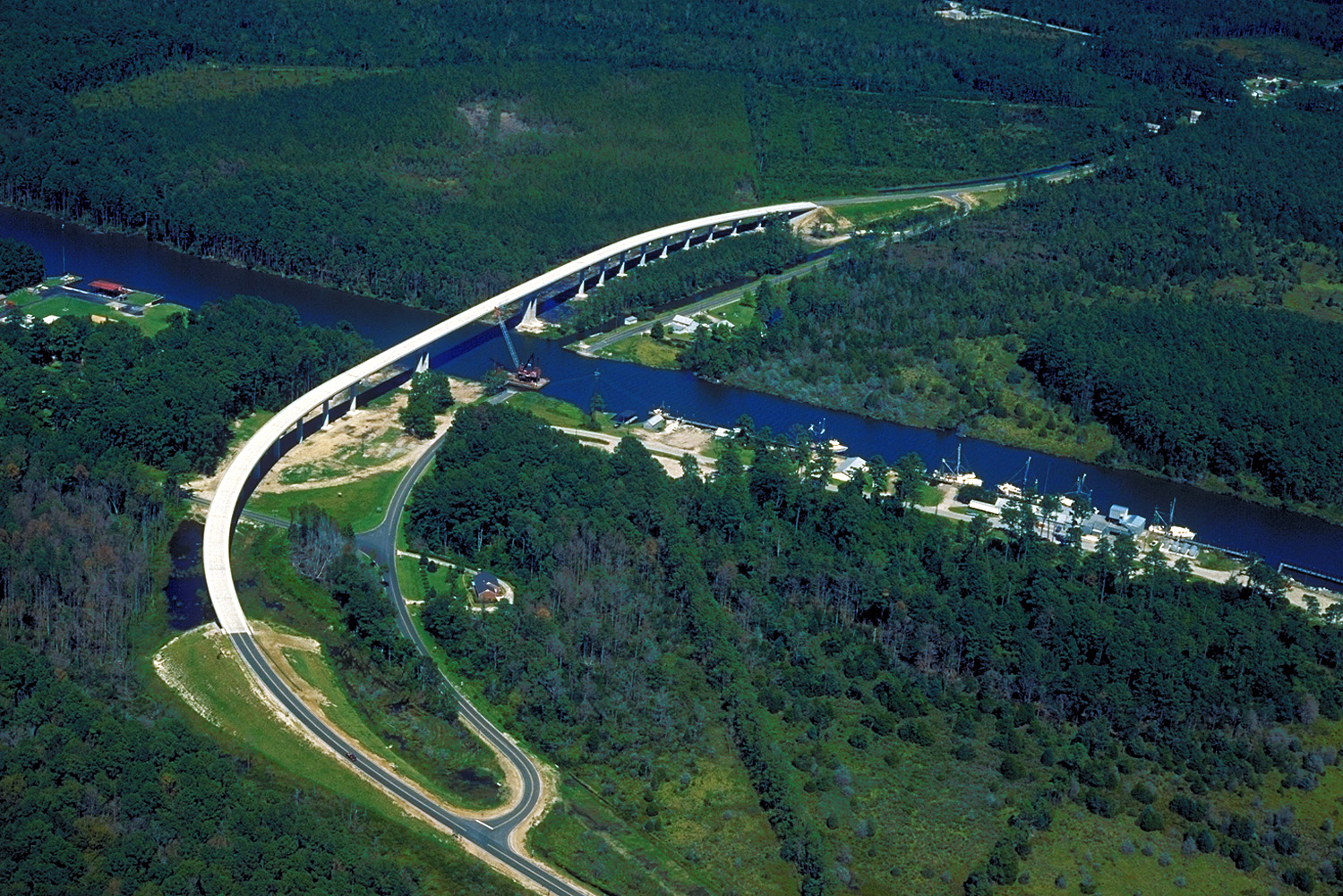
A section of the Intracoastal Waterway in Pamlico County crossed by the Hobucken Bridge.

According to the U.S. Census Bureau, the county has a total area of 561.63 square miles (1,454.6 km^{2}), of which 336.52 square miles (871.6 km^{2}) is land and 225.11 square miles (583.0 km^{2}) (40.08%) is water. Pamlico County is the only County in North Carolina to not have any U.S highways or Interstates that pass through it.

=== State and local protected areas ===
- Goose Creek Game Land (part)
- Neuse River Game Land (part)
- Light Ground Pocosin Game Land

=== Major water bodies ===
- Bay River
- Goose Creek
- Intracoastal Waterway
- Neuse River
- Pamlico River

=== Adjacent counties ===
- Beaufort County – north
- Hyde County – northeast
- Carteret County – southeast
- Craven County – southwest

=== Major highways ===
- NC 33
- NC 55
- NC 304
- NC 306
- NC 307

=== Major infrastructure ===
- Cherry Branch–Minnesott Beach Ferry (to Craven County)

== Demographics ==
Historical population
Census	Pop.	Note	%±
1880	6,323		—
1890	7,146		13.0%
1900	8,045		12.6%
1910	9,966		23.9%
1920	9,060		−9.1%
1930	9,299		2.6%
1940	9,706		4.4%
1950	9,993		3.0%
1960	9,850		−1.4%
1970	9,467		−3.9%
1980	10,398		9.8%
1990	11,372		9.4%
2000	12,934		13.7%
2010	13,144		1.6%
2020	12,276		−6.6%
2025 (est.)	12,758	▲	3.9%
U.S. Decennial Census; 1790–1960 1900–1990; 1990–2000 2010 2020

Census reports show a marked drop of nearly 10 percent in county population from 1910 to 1920, the period of the Great Migration of African Americans from rural areas of the South to northern and midwestern industrial cities offering more economic and social opportunities. Workers were recruited by northern industries, including the Pennsylvania Railroad, which was rapidly expanding at the time.

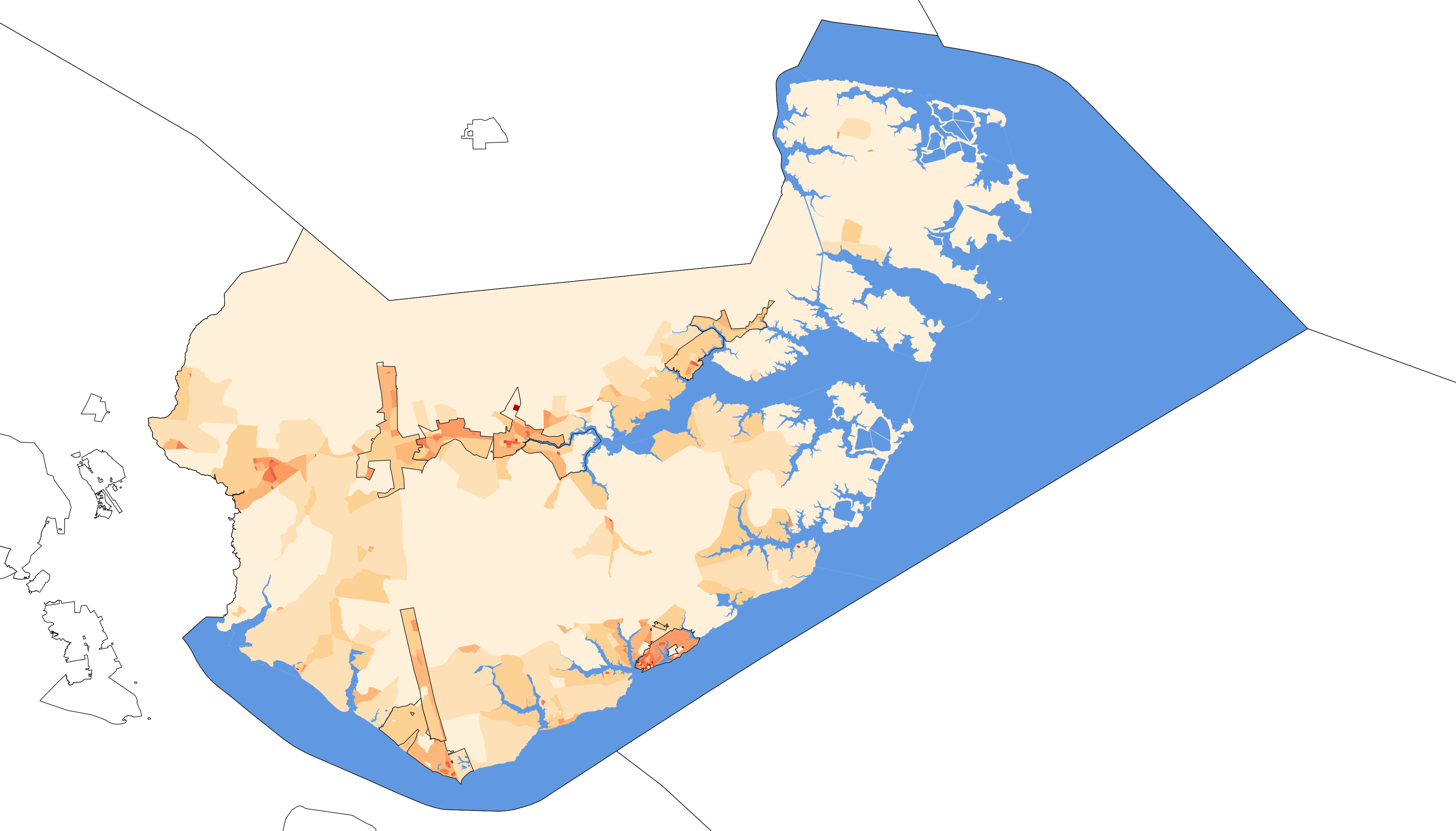
2020 population density of Pamlico County NC by census block

=== Racial and ethnic composition ===
Pamlico County, North Carolina – Racial and ethnic composition Note: the US Census treats Hispanic/Latino as an ethnic category. This table excludes Latinos from the racial categories and assigns them to a separate category. Hispanics/Latinos may be of any race.
Race / Ethnicity (NH = Non-Hispanic)	Pop 1980	Pop 1990	Pop 2000	Pop 2010	Pop 2020	% 1980	% 1990	% 2000	% 2010	% 2020
White alone (NH)	7,074	8,317	9,384	9,828	9,104	68.03%	73.14%	72.55%	74.77%	74.16%
Black or African American alone (NH)	3,215	2,940	3,167	2,618	2,055	30.92%	25.85%	24.49%	19.92%	16.74%
Native American or Alaska Native alone (NH)	35	33	66	72	58	0.34%	0.29%	0.51%	0.55%	0.47%
Asian alone (NH)	10	20	49	48	50	0.10%	0.18%	0.38%	0.37%	0.41%
Native Hawaiian or Pacific Islander alone (NH)	x	x	2	10	5	x	x	0.02%	0.08%	0.04%
Other race alone (NH)	10	1	9	6	51	0.10%	0.01%	0.07%	0.05%	0.42%
Mixed race or Multiracial (NH)	x	x	86	150	457	x	x	0.66%	1.14%	3.72%
Hispanic or Latino (any race)	54	61	171	412	496	0.52%	0.54%	1.32%	3.13%	4.04%
Total	10,398	11,372	12,934	13,144	12,276	100.00%	100.00%	100.00%	100.00%	100.00%

=== 2020 census ===
As of the 2020 census, there were 12,276 people, 5,193 households, and 3,589 families residing in the county.

The median age was 54.6 years. 14.6% of residents were under the age of 18 and 31.7% of residents were 65 years of age or older. For every 100 females there were 103.4 males, and for every 100 females age 18 and over there were 104.2 males age 18 and over.

The racial makeup of the county was 75.1% White, 16.8% Black or African American, 0.5% American Indian and Alaska Native, 0.5% Asian, 0.1% Native Hawaiian and Pacific Islander, 2.0% from some other race, and 5.1% from two or more races. Hispanic or Latino residents of any race comprised 4.0% of the population.

Less than 0.1% of residents lived in urban areas, while 100.0% lived in rural areas.

There were 7,118 housing units, of which 27.0% were vacant. Among occupied housing units, 80.5% were owner-occupied and 19.5% were renter-occupied. The homeowner vacancy rate was 2.6% and the rental vacancy rate was 11.6%.

=== 2000 census ===
At the 2000 census, there were 12,934 people, 5,178 households, and 3,717 families residing in the county. The population density was 38 people per square mile (15 people/km^{2}). There were 6,781 housing units at an average density of 20 units per square mile (7.7 units/km^{2}). The racial makeup of the county was 73.17% White, 24.57% Black or African American, 0.53% Native American, 0.38% Asian, 0.02% Pacific Islander, 0.59% from other races, and 0.74% from two or more races. 1.32% of the population were Hispanic or Latino of any race.

There were 5,178 households, out of which 25.20% had children under the age of 18 living with them, 56.60% were married couples living together, 11.50% had a female householder with no husband present, and 28.20% were non-families. 25.00% of all households were made up of individuals, and 12.10% had someone living alone who was 65 years of age or older. The average household size was 2.38 and the average family size was 2.81.

In the county, the population was spread out, with 21.10% under the age of 18, 6.40% from 18 to 24, 25.80% from 25 to 44, 28.00% from 45 to 64, and 18.80% who were 65 years of age or older. The median age was 43 years. For every 100 females there were 101.40 males. For every 100 females age 18 and over, there were 99.80 males.

The median income for a household in the county was $34,084, and the median income for a family was $41,659. Males had a median income of $31,806 versus $21,344 for females. The per capita income for the county was $18,005. About 11.80% of families and 15.30% of the population were below the poverty line, including 24.20% of those under age 18 and 13.40% of those age 65 or over.

== Government and politics ==
The county is a member of the regional Eastern Carolina Council of Governments.

Pamlico County is governed by an elected, seven-member Board of Commissioners.

United States presidential election results for Pamlico County, North Carolina
Year	Republican		Democratic		Third party(ies)	
Year	No.	%	No.	%	No.	%
1912	74	6.62%	694	62.13%	349	31.24%
1916	527	41.99%	710	56.57%	18	1.43%
1920	1,008	43.94%	1,286	56.06%	0	0.00%
1924	459	36.52%	798	63.48%	0	0.00%
1928	1,099	55.59%	878	44.41%	0	0.00%
1932	665	29.35%	1,526	67.34%	75	3.31%
1936	860	34.58%	1,627	65.42%	0	0.00%
1940	730	33.52%	1,448	66.48%	0	0.00%
1944	719	35.70%	1,295	64.30%	0	0.00%
1948	685	31.18%	1,370	62.36%	142	6.46%
1952	903	38.74%	1,428	61.26%	0	0.00%
1956	954	40.94%	1,376	59.06%	0	0.00%
1960	1,061	38.47%	1,697	61.53%	0	0.00%
1964	1,036	35.72%	1,864	64.28%	0	0.00%
1968	745	21.46%	1,280	36.87%	1,447	41.68%
1972	1,847	66.11%	919	32.89%	28	1.00%
1976	1,068	33.28%	2,113	65.85%	28	0.87%
1980	1,504	39.55%	2,224	58.48%	75	1.97%
1984	2,554	54.14%	2,152	45.62%	11	0.23%
1988	2,297	50.98%	2,188	48.56%	21	0.47%
1992	1,929	38.77%	2,229	44.80%	817	16.42%
1996	2,270	47.39%	2,204	46.01%	316	6.60%
2000	2,999	57.21%	2,188	41.74%	55	1.05%
2004	3,679	60.93%	2,335	38.67%	24	0.40%
2008	3,823	56.96%	2,838	42.28%	51	0.76%
2012	4,051	59.91%	2,647	39.15%	64	0.95%
2016	4,258	61.98%	2,448	35.63%	164	2.39%
2020	4,849	63.54%	2,713	35.55%	69	0.90%
2024	5,229	65.56%	2,676	33.55%	71	0.89%

== Communities ==
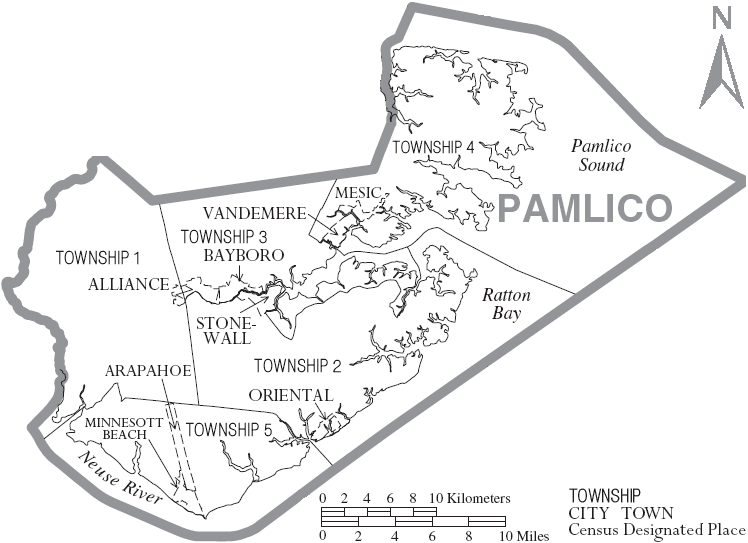
Map of Pamlico County with municipal and township labels

=== Towns ===
- Alliance
- Arapahoe
- Bayboro (county seat and largest community)
- Grantsboro
- Mesic
- Minnesott Beach
- Oriental
- Stonewall
- Vandemere

=== Census-designated place ===
- Hobucken

=== Unincorporated communities ===
- Florence
- Janerio
- Lowland
- Maribel
- Merritt
- Olympia
- Reelsboro
- Whortonsville

=== Townships ===
By the requirements of the North Carolina Constitution of 1868, the county was divided into 5 townships, which are only numbered:

- Township 1
- Township 2
- Township 3
- Township 4
- Township 5

== Notable people ==
- David B. Mintz, Methodist circuit rider minister for Pamlico in 1804

== See also ==
- List of counties in North Carolina
- National Register of Historic Places listings in Pamlico County, North Carolina

== Works cited ==
- Corbitt, David Leroy (2000). The formation of the North Carolina counties, 1663-1943 (reprint ed.). Raleigh: North Carolina Division of Archives and History. OCLC 46398241.
- Mobley, Joe A. (1991). Pamlico County: A Brief History. North Carolina Division of Archives and History. ISBN 9780865262522.
