= Hobucken, North Carolina =

- Unincorporated community
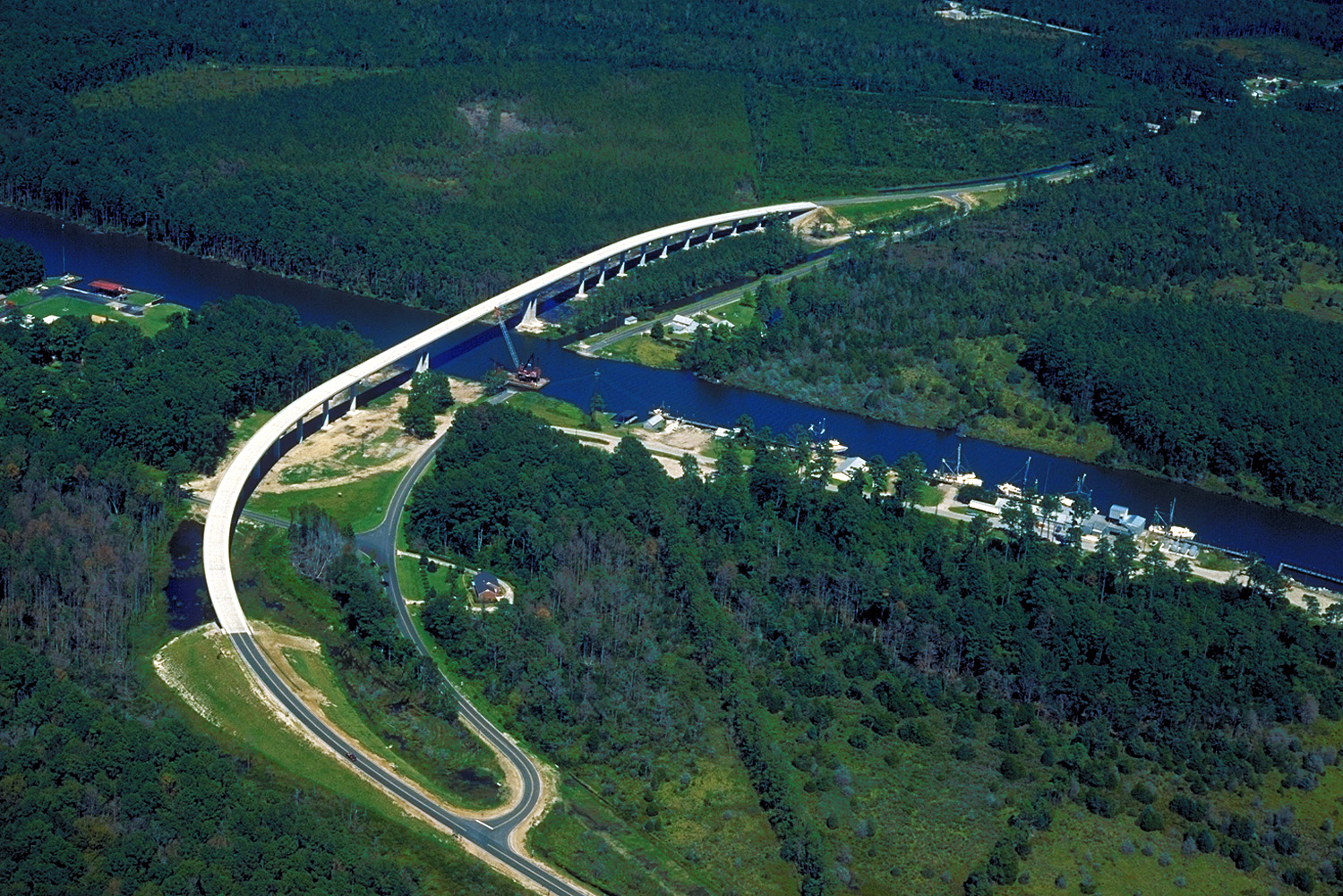
- Aerial view of a stretch of the Intracoastal Waterway in Pamlico County, North Carolina, USA. The U.S. Army Corps of Engineers constructed the Hobucken Bridge over the waterway to replace an old swing-style drawbridge. The bridge carries NC state routes 33 and 304 over the waterway.

- Location within North Carolina Location within the United States
- Coordinates: 35°15′16″N 76°34′17″W
- Country: United States
- State: North Carolina
- County: Pamlico

Area
  - Total: 5.11 sq mi (13.24 km^{2})
  - Land: 5.08 sq mi (13.16 km^{2})
  - Water: 0.031 sq mi (0.08 km^{2})
- Elevation: 0 ft (0 m)

Population (2020)
  - Total: 99
  - Density: 19.5/sq mi (7.53/km^{2})
- Time zone: UTC-5 (Eastern (EST))
  - Summer (DST): UTC-4 (EDT)
- ZIP code: 28537
- Area code: 252
- GNIS feature ID: 2628636

Hobucken is an unincorporated community and census-designated place (CDP) in Pamlico County, North Carolina, United States. Its population was 38 as of the 2020 census. Hobucken has a post office with ZIP code 28537. North Carolina Highway 33 and North Carolina Highway 304 pass through in the community.

== Demographics ==
Historical population
Census	Pop.	Note	%±
2020	99		—
U.S. Decennial Census
