= Stonewall, North Carolina =

- Town
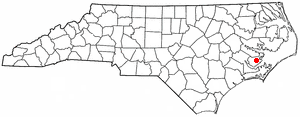
- Location of Stonewall, North Carolina
- Coordinates: 35°08′14″N 76°44′26″W
- Country: United States
- State: North Carolina
- County: Pamlico

Area
  - Total: 2.01 sq mi (5.21 km^{2})
  - Land: 1.71 sq mi (4.42 km^{2})
  - Water: 0.31 sq mi (0.79 km^{2})
- Elevation: 10 ft (3.0 m)

Population (2020)
  - Total: 214
  - Density: 125.4/sq mi (48.42/km^{2})
- Time zone: UTC-5 (Eastern (EST))
  - Summer (DST): UTC-4 (EDT)
- ZIP code: 28583
- Area code: 252
- FIPS code: 37-65120
- GNIS feature ID: 2406672

Stonewall is a town in Pamlico County, North Carolina, United States. As of the 2020 census, Stonewall had a population of 214. It is part of the New Bern, North Carolina Micropolitan Statistical Area.

== Geography ==
According to the United States Census Bureau, the town has a total area of 2.0 square miles (5.2 km^{2}), of which 1.7 square miles (4.4 km^{2}) is land and 0.4 square miles (1.0 km^{2}) (17.65%) is water.

== Demographics ==
Historical population
| Census | Pop. | Note | %± |
|---|---|---|---|
| 1880 | 209 | | — |
| 1890 | 196 | | −6.2% |
| 1900 | 168 | | −14.3% |
| 1910 | 161 | | −4.2% |
| 1920 | 218 | | 35.4% |
| 1930 | 329 | | 50.9% |
| 1940 | 261 | | −20.7% |
| 1950 | 272 | | 4.2% |
| 1960 | 214 | | −21.3% |
| 1970 | 335 | | 56.5% |
| 1980 | 360 | | 7.5% |
| 1990 | 279 | | −22.5% |
| 2000 | 285 | | 2.2% |
| 2010 | 281 | | −1.4% |
| 2020 | 214 | | −23.8% |
U.S. Decennial Census

As of the census of 2000, there were 285 people, 118 households, and 80 families residing in the town. The population density was 169.5 people per square mile (65.4 people/km^{2}). There were 133 housing units at an average density of 79.1 per square mile (30.5/km^{2}). The racial makeup of the town was 74.39% White, 22.11% African American, 0.70% Asian, 0.70% from other races, and 2.11% from two or more races. Hispanic or Latino of any race were 1.05% of the population.

There were 118 households, out of which 28.8% had children under the age of 18 living with them, 50.8% were married couples living together, 12.7% had a female householder with no husband present, and 31.4% were non-families. 27.1% of all households were made up of individuals, and 8.5% had someone living alone who was 65 years of age or older. The average household size was 2.42 and the average family size was 2.96.

In the town, the population was spread out, with 24.2% under the age of 18, 6.7% from 18 to 24, 25.6% from 25 to 44, 31.2% from 45 to 64, and 12.3% who were 65 years of age or older. The median age was 40 years. For every 100 females, there were 97.9 males. For every 100 females age 18 and over, there were 101.9 males.

The median income for a household in the town was $30,000, and the median income for a family was $45,000. Males had a median income of $28,625 versus $17,143 for females. The per capita income for the town was $16,425. About 4.2% of families and 5.5% of the population were below the poverty line, including 3.6% of those under the age of eighteen and 8.3% of those 65 or over.
