= Grantsboro, North Carolina =

Coordinates: 35°08′26″N 76°50′33″W

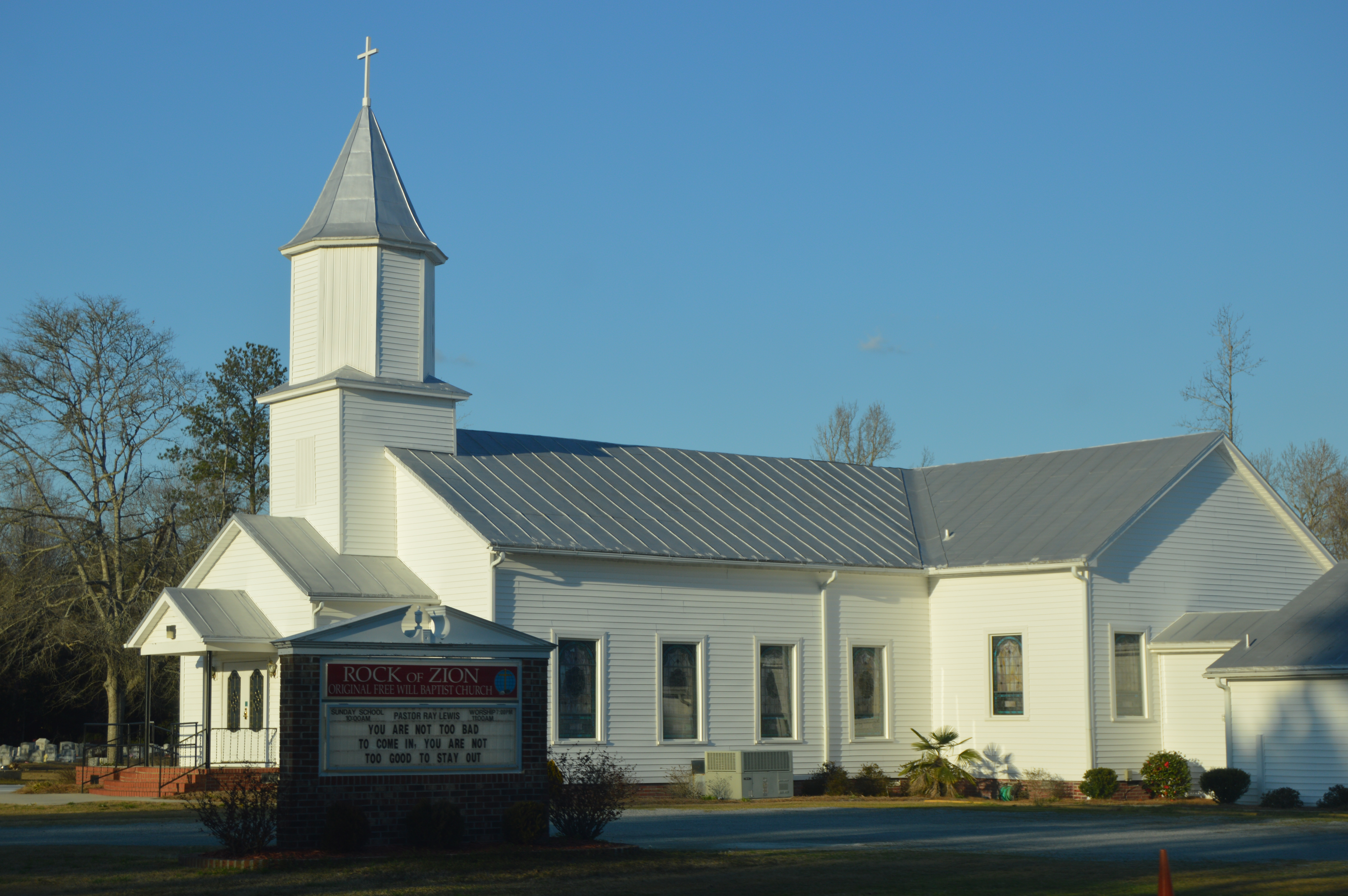
Baptist church

Grantsboro is a town in Pamlico County, North Carolina, United States. It was incorporated in 1997 and is located at the intersection of North Carolina Highways 55 and 306. The town is part of the New Bern, North Carolina Metropolitan Statistical Area. As of the 2020 census, Grantsboro had a population of 692.

== Demographics ==
Historical population
Census	Pop.	Note	%±
2010	688		—
2020	692		0.6%
U.S. Decennial Census

=== 2020 census ===
Grantsboro racial composition
Race	Number	Percentage
White (non-Hispanic)	523	75.58%
Black or African American (non-Hispanic)	73	10.55%
Native American	3	0.43%
Asian	2	0.29%
Other/Mixed	40	5.78%
Hispanic or Latino	51	7.37%

As of the 2020 United States census, there were 692 people, 247 households, and 177 families residing in the town.

=== 2010 census ===
Grantsboro had a population of 688 in 2010.
