= Vandemere, North Carolina =

- Town
- Interactive map of Vandemere, North Carolina
- Coordinates: 35°11′19″N 76°39′54″W
- Country: United States
- State: North Carolina
- County: Pamlico

Area
  - Total: 1.63 sq mi (4.23 km^{2})
  - Land: 1.52 sq mi (3.94 km^{2})
  - Water: 0.11 sq mi (0.28 km^{2})
- Elevation: 3 ft (0.91 m)

Population (2020)
  - Total: 246
  - Density: 161.6/sq mi (62.39/km^{2})
- Time zone: UTC-5 (Eastern (EST))
  - Summer (DST): UTC-4 (EDT)
- ZIP code: 28587
- Area code: 252
- FIPS code: 37-69720
- GNIS feature ID: 2406790
- Website: https://www.vandemerenc.com/

Vandemere is a town in Pamlico County, North Carolina, United States. As of the 2020 census, Vandemere had a population of 246. It is part of the New Bern, North Carolina Micropolitan Statistical Area.

== Geography ==
According to the United States Census Bureau, the town has a total area of 1.6 square miles (4.1 km^{2}), of which 1.5 square miles (3.9 km^{2}) is land and 0.1 square miles (0.26 km^{2}) (7.41%) is water.

== Demographics ==
Historical population
Census	Pop.	Note	%±
1890	90		—
1900	169		87.8%
1910	296		75.1%
1920	308		4.1%
1930	360		16.9%
1940	436		21.1%
1950	475		8.9%
1960	452		−4.8%
1970	379		−16.2%
1980	335		−11.6%
1990	299		−10.7%
2000	289		−3.3%
2010	254		−12.1%
2020	246		−3.1%
U.S. Decennial Census

=== 2020 census ===
Vandemere racial composition
Race	Number	Percentage
White (non-Hispanic)	105	42.68%
Black or African American (non-Hispanic)	125	50.81%
Native American	1	0.41%
Asian	3	1.22%
Other/Mixed	12	4.88%

As of the 2020 United States census, there were 246 people, 102 households, and 70 families residing in the town.

=== 2000 census ===
As of the census of 2000, there were 289 people, 123 households, and 78 families residing in the town. The population density was 192.7 people per square mile (74.4 people/km^{2}). There were 153 housing units at an average density of 102.0 per square mile (39.4/km^{2}). The racial makeup of the town was 46.37% White, 52.94% African American, 0.35% Native American, and 0.35% from two or more races. Hispanic or Latino of any race were 2.08% of the population.

There were 123 households, out of which 21.1% had children under the age of 18 living with them, 41.5% were married couples living together, 17.9% had a female householder with no husband present, and 35.8% were non-families. 35.8% of all households were made up of individuals, and 14.6% had someone living alone who was 65 years of age or older. The average household size was 2.35 and the average family size was 3.05.

In the town, the population was spread out, with 21.5% under the age of 18, 7.3% from 18 to 24, 21.5% from 25 to 44, 29.1% from 45 to 64, and 20.8% who were 65 years of age or older. The median age was 45 years. For every 100 females, there were 80.6 males. For every 100 females age 18 and over, there were 76.0 males.

The median income for a household in the town was $32,917, and the median income for a family was $40,556. Males had a median income of $26,250 versus $19,250 for females. The per capita income for the town was $13,570. About 11.6% of families and 21.6% of the population were below the poverty line, including 25.9% of those under the age of eighteen and 35.2% of those 65 or over.

== History ==
Vandemere is situated on a point where Vandemere Creek flows into the Bay River. It was incorporated in 1874 and was the county seat from 1872 (when Pamlico County was formed) to 1876.

Many of the descendants of the first colonists in North Carolina are still living in Vandemere today and many of the names live on, both in the names of the people and the places.

In 1699, a treaty was forged between the English Crown and the "Bay River Indians". Early settlers came from England, but there are also reports of French Huguenots and others including Dutch and Flemish.

By the 18th century, there are written records of some European habitation in the Vandemere area. Records show that there was a Native American people who lived "at the head of Vandemore's Creek." These early records show various spellings of the name of Vandemere, most showing Dutch or Flemish origin.

As early as 1679, there are records showing a "Tho. Vandermoller" being witness to a will, and in 1882 a land grant record that refers to ""Jno. Vandemore."

== Recent events ==
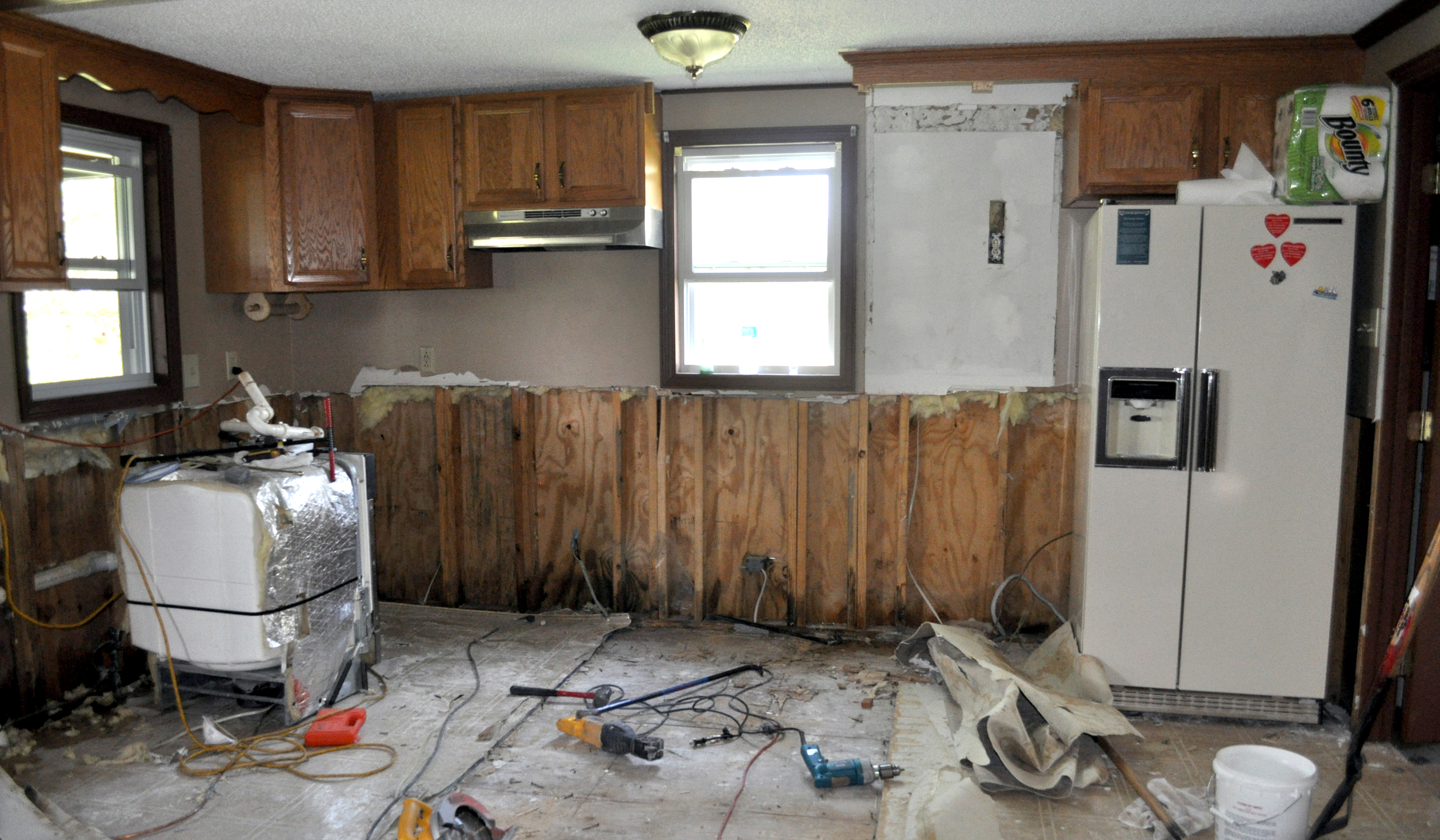
Vandemere kitchen gutted as a consequence of Hurricane Irene, removing mold

On August 27, 2011, there was a devastating flood caused by Hurricane Irene, demolishing just over 100 homes. Local contractors aided the attempt to repair, and in some cases, even build new houses. Officials have upped the standards on flood regulations, requiring such items as higher outlets and raised houses.
