= Bayboro, North Carolina =

- Town
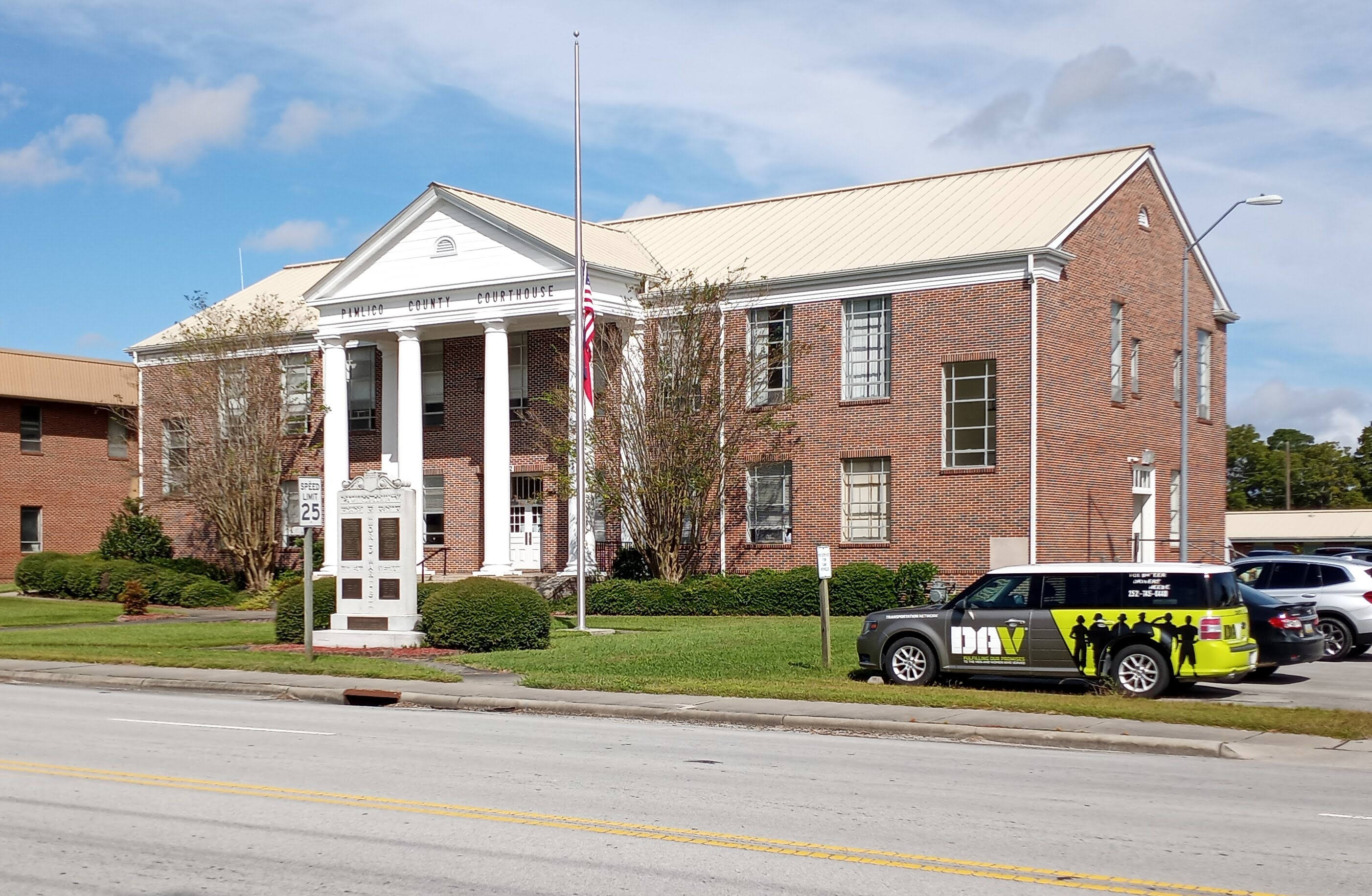
- Pamlico County Courthouse

- Seal
- Motto: "A Southern Hospitality Village"
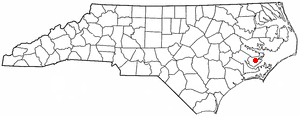
- Location of Bayboro, North Carolina
- Coordinates: 35°08′51″N 76°46′09″W
- Country: United States
- State: North Carolina
- County: Pamlico

Area
  - Total: 1.86 sq mi (4.83 km^{2})
  - Land: 1.86 sq mi (4.81 km^{2})
  - Water: 0.0039 sq mi (0.01 km^{2})
- Elevation: 7 ft (2.1 m)

Population (2020)
  - Total: 1,161
  - Density: 624.8/sq mi (241.22/km^{2})
- Time zone: UTC-5 (Eastern (EST))
  - Summer (DST): UTC-4 (EDT)
- ZIP code: 28515
- Area code: 252
- FIPS code: 37-03960
- GNIS feature ID: 2405218
- Website: www.townofbayboro.net

Bayboro is a town in Pamlico County, North Carolina, United States. The population was 1,161 at the 2020 U.S. census. It is the county seat of Pamlico County.

Bayboro is part of the New Bern Metropolitan Statistical Area.

Bayboro received the most rain of any American town during Hurricane Irene in 2011, at 15.74 inches.

== Geography ==
According to the United States Census Bureau, the town has a total area of 1.5 square miles (3.9 km^{2}), of which 1.5 square miles (3.9 km^{2}) is land and 0.04 square miles (0.10 km^{2}) (1.34%) is water.

== Demographics ==
Historical population
Census	Pop.	Note	%±
1890	252		—
1900	292		15.9%
1910	370		26.7%
1920	349		−5.7%
1930	468		34.1%
1940	428		−8.5%
1950	453		5.8%
1960	545		20.3%
1970	665		22.0%
1980	759		14.1%
1990	733		−3.4%
2000	741		1.1%
2010	1,263		70.4%
2020	1,161		−8.1%
2023 (est.)	1,026	▼	−11.6%
U.S. Decennial Census

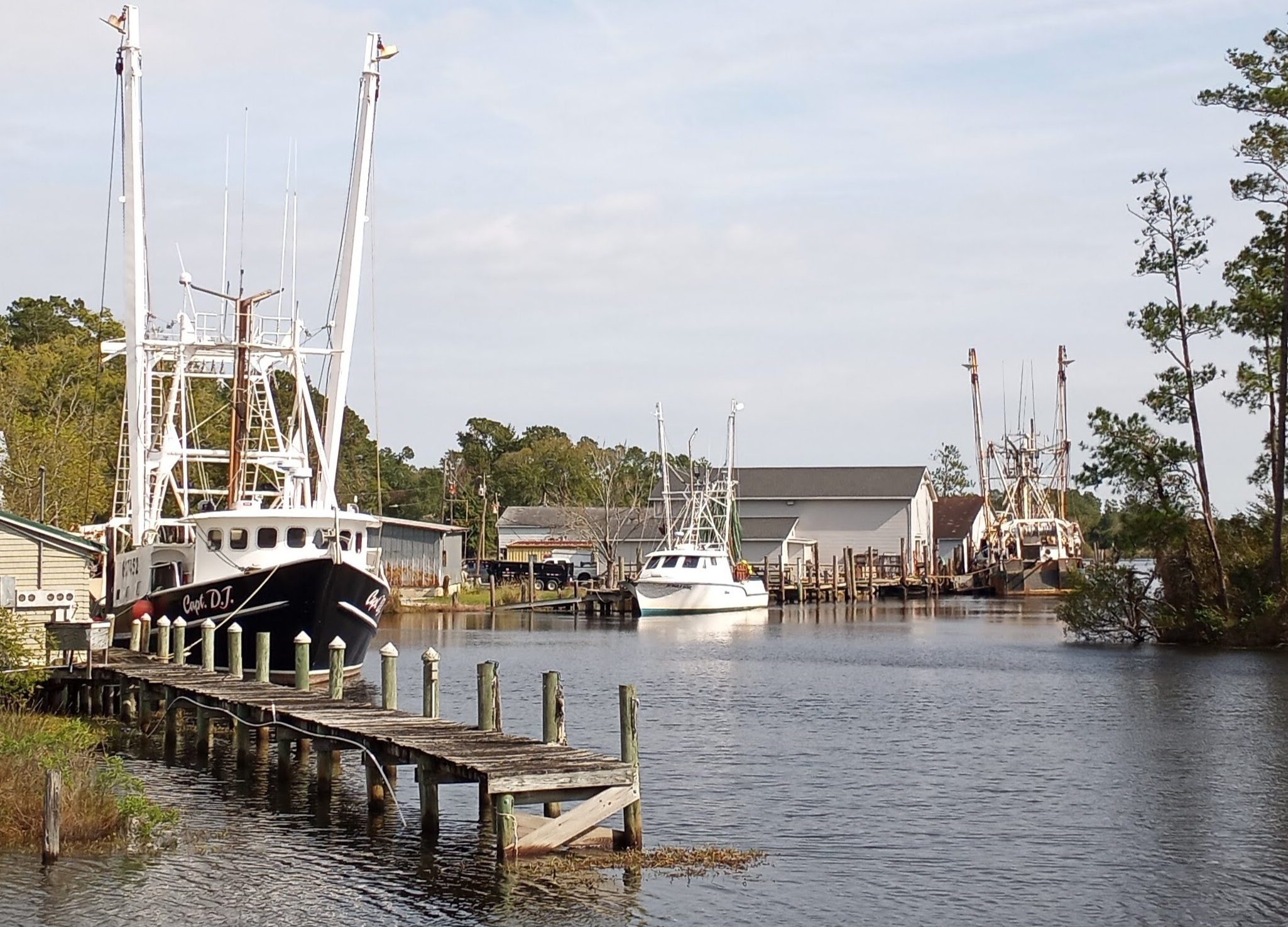
Commercial fishing boats on the Bay River

=== 2020 census ===
Bayboro racial composition
Race	Number	Percentage
White (non-Hispanic)	533	45.91%
Black or African American (non-Hispanic)	526	45.31%
Native American	4	0.34%
Asian	1	0.09%
Pacific Islander	2	0.17%
Other/Mixed	36	3.1%
Hispanic or Latino	59	5.08%

As of the 2020 United States census, there were 1,161 people, 272 households, and 162 families residing in the town.

=== 2000 census ===
As of the census of 2000, there were 741 people, 301 households, and 198 families residing in the town. The population density was 502.6 inhabitants per square mile (194.1/km^{2}). There were 340 housing units at an average density of 230.6 per square mile (89.0/km^{2}). The racial makeup of the town was 46.69% White, 51.15% African American, 0.40% Native American, 0.40% Asian, 0.94% from other races, and 0.40% from two or more races. Hispanic or Latino of any race were 1.48% of the population.

There were 301 households, out of which 24.3% had children under the age of 18 living with them, 38.5% were married couples living together, 24.3% had a female householder with no husband present, and 33.9% were non-families. 31.6% of all households were made up of individuals, and 14.3% had someone living alone who was 65 years of age or older. The average household size was 2.36 and the average family size was 2.97.

In the town, the population was spread out, with 25.0% under the age of 18, 6.9% from 18 to 24, 25.9% from 25 to 44, 23.2% from 45 to 64, and 19.0% who were 65 years of age or older. The median age was 41 years. For every 100 females, there were 95.0 males. For every 100 females age 18 and over, there were 87.8 males.

The median income for a household in the town was $26,563, and the median income for a family was $35,769. Males had a median income of $23,750 versus $19,196 for females. The per capita income for the town was $13,709. About 22.3% of families and 28.5% of the population were below the poverty line, including 48.3% of those under age 18 and 17.9% of those age 65 or over.

== Notable residents ==
- W. T. Caho, lawyer, fisheries official, and state senator
