= National Register of Historic Places listings in Jones County, North Carolina =

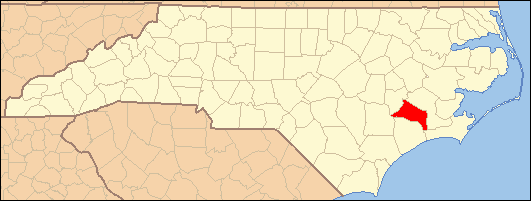

This list includes properties and districts listed on the National Register of Historic Places in Jones County, North Carolina. Click the "Map of all coordinates" link to the right to view a Google map of all properties and districts with latitude and longitude coordinates in the table below.

== Current listings ==
This National Park Service list is complete through NPS recent listings posted March 14, 2025.

	Name on the Register	Image	Date listed	Location	City or town	Description
1	Bryan-Bell Farm	Bryan-Bell Farm	December 21, 1989 (#89002155)	NC 58, 1 miles E of SR 1119; 34°59′51″N 77°15′20″W	Pollocksville	
2	Eagle Nest	Eagle Nest	November 13, 1974 (#74001356)	SE of Pink Hill off NC 41; 35°01′05″N 77°34′02″W	Pink Hill	
3	Foscue and Simmons Plantations	Foscue and Simmons Plantations	October 7, 1998 (#98000197)	US 17, from Trent R. and Banks Rd. 35°02′21″N 77°12′01″W	Pollocksville	
4	Foscue Plantation House	Foscue Plantation House	November 19, 1971 (#71000598)	Off U.S. 17 near jct. with SR 1002; 35°02′23″N 77°12′32″W	Pollocksville	
5	Grace Episcopal Church	Grace Episcopal Church	January 20, 1972 (#72000966)	Lake View Dr. and Weber St. 35°03′43″N 77°21′14″W	Trenton	
6	Bryan Lavender House	Bryan Lavender House	April 25, 1985 (#85000904)	Off US 17 South of Trent River Bridge; 35°00′31″N 77°13′10″W	Pollocksville	
7	Sanderson House	Sanderson House	December 16, 1971 (#71000599)	SW of Pollocksville on SR 1115; 34°59′03″N 77°16′33″W	Pollocksville	
8	Trenton Historic District	Trenton Historic District	July 3, 1974 (#74001357)	Roughly bounded by Trent, Lower and Pollock Sts., and Brock Mill Pond; 35°03′53″N 77°21′31″W	Trenton	
9	Wyse Fork Battlefield	Wyse Fork Battlefield	July 10, 2017 (#100001301)	Southeast of Kinston; 35°13′48″N 77°31′12″W	Kinston	Extends into Lenoir County

== See also ==
- National Register of Historic Places listings in North Carolina
- List of National Historic Landmarks in North Carolina
