= Jumping Creek (Trent River tributary) =

Stream in North Carolina, USA

Jumping Creek Tributary to Trent River
- Location of Jumping Creek mouth Jumping Creek (Trent River tributary) (the United States)

Location
- Country: United States
- State: North Carolina
- County: Jones

Physical characteristics
- Source: Beaverdam Creek divide
  - location: about 5 miles northeast of Trenton, North Carolina
  - coordinates: 35°05′41″N 077°17′23″W
  - elevation: 46 ft (14 m)
- Mouth: Trent River
  - location: about 2.5 miles north of Oliver Crossroads, North Carolina
  - coordinates: 35°03′09″N 077°18′16″W
  - elevation: 3 ft (0.91 m)
- Length: 4.73 mi (7.61 km)
- Basin size: 6.44 square miles (16.7 km^{2})
- Discharge
  - location: Trent River
  - average: 9.32 cu ft/s (0.264 m^{3}/s) at mouth with Trent River

Basin features
- Progression: Trent River → Neuse River → Pamlico Sound → Atlantic Ocean
- River system: Neuse River
- Tributaries
  - left: unnamed tributaries
  - right: unnamed tributaries
- Bridges: Furney Brock Road, Ten Mile Fork Road

Jumping Creek is a 4.73 mi (7.61 km) long 1st order tributary to the Trent River in Jones County, North Carolina.

== Course ==
Jumping Creek rises about 5 miles northeast of Trenton, North Carolina and then flows south to join the Trent River about 2.5 miles north of Olivers Crossroads.

== Watershed ==
Jumping Creek drains 6.44 square miles (16.7 km^{2}) of area, receives about 54.8 in/year of precipitation, has a wetness index of 587.25, and is about 24% forested.

== See also ==
- List of rivers of North Carolina
