= Miry Hole Branch =

Stream in North Carolina, USA

Miry Hole Branch Tributary to Trent River
- Location of Miry Hole Branch mouth Miry Hole Branch (the United States)

Location
- Country: United States
- State: North Carolina
- County: Jones

Physical characteristics
- Source: Reedy Branch divide
  - location: about 2 miles south of Trent Woods, North Carolina
  - coordinates: 35°03′19″N 077°07′31″W
  - elevation: 15 ft (4.6 m)
- Mouth: Trent River
  - location: about 0.5 miles east of River Bend, North Carolina
  - coordinates: 35°03′43″N 077°08′20″W
  - elevation: 0 ft (0 m)
- Length: 0.91 mi (1.46 km)
- Basin size: 1.44 square miles (3.7 km^{2})
- Discharge
  - location: Trent River
  - average: 2.29 cu ft/s (0.065 m^{3}/s) at mouth with Trent River

Basin features
- Progression: Trent River → Neuse River → Pamlico Sound → Atlantic Ocean
- River system: Neuse River
- Tributaries
  - left: unnamed tributaries
  - right: unnamed tributaries
- Bridges: Crump Farm Road

Miry Hole Branch is a 0.92 mi (1.48 km) long 1st order tributary to the Trent River in Jones County, North Carolina. This is the only stream of this name in the United States.

== Course ==
Miry Hole Branch rises about 2 miles south of Trent Woods, North Carolina and then flows northwest to join the Trent River about 0.5 miles east of River Bend.

== Watershed ==
Miry Hole Branch drains 1.44 square miles (3.7 km^{2}) of area, receives about 54.7 in/year of precipitation, has a wetness index of 528.11, and is about 47% forested.

== See also ==
- List of rivers of North Carolina
