= Trent River (North Carolina) =

Stream in North Carolina, USA

Trent River Tributary to Neuse River
- Location of Trent River mouth Trent River (North Carolina) (the United States)

Location
- Country: United States
- State: North Carolina
- County: Craven; Jones; Lenoir
- City: Trenton; New Bern

Physical characteristics
- Source: Mathews Creek divide
  - location: about 3 miles north of Pink Hill, North Carolina
  - coordinates: 35°06′04″N 077°44′47″W
  - elevation: 42 ft (13 m)
- Mouth: Neuse River
  - location: New Bern, North Carolina
  - coordinates: 35°06′04″N 077°02′12″W
  - elevation: 0 ft (0 m)
- Length: 87.15 mi (140.25 km)
- Basin size: 549.95 square miles (1,424.4 km^{2})
- Discharge
  - location: Neuse River
  - average: 653.31 cu ft/s (18.500 m^{3}/s) at mouth with Neuse River

Basin features
- Progression: Neuse River → Pamlico Sound → Atlantic Ocean
- River system: Neuse River
- Tributaries
  - left: Horse Branch, Joshua Branch, Black Swamp, Mill Branch, Little Chinquapin Branch, Chinquapin Branch, Beaver Creek, Resolution Branch, Musselshell Branch, Jumping Creek, Beaverdam Creek, Long Branch, Scott Creek, Rocky Run, Wilson Creek
  - right: Running Branch, Beaverdam Swamp, Tuckahoe Creek, Reedy Branch, Cypress Creek, Jack Cabin Branch, Pocoson Branch, Poplar Branch, Crooked Run, French Branch, Mill Run, Little Hell Creek, Goshen Branch, Mill Creek, West Prong Raccoon Creek, Island Creek, Miry Hole Branch, Reedy Branch, Hoods Creek, Brice Creek
- Bridges: Old Pink Hill Road, NC 11, Davis Mill Road, Mark N. Smith Road, Perry Buzzard Road, US 258, Pleasant Hill Road (x2), Chinquapin Chapel Road, Middle Road, NC 41, US 17, US 70

The Trent River is a fresh water river of the coastal plain region of eastern North Carolina. It flows in an easterly direction from its origin approximately 15 miles (24 km) southwest of Kinston, North Carolina and traverses portions of Lenoir County, Jones County and Craven County prior to emptying into the Neuse River at New Bern, North Carolina. Trenton and Pollocksville are small towns that lie along its course. The river measures 720 yards (660 m) at its widest point and is fed by numerous fresh water branches and creeks along its length.

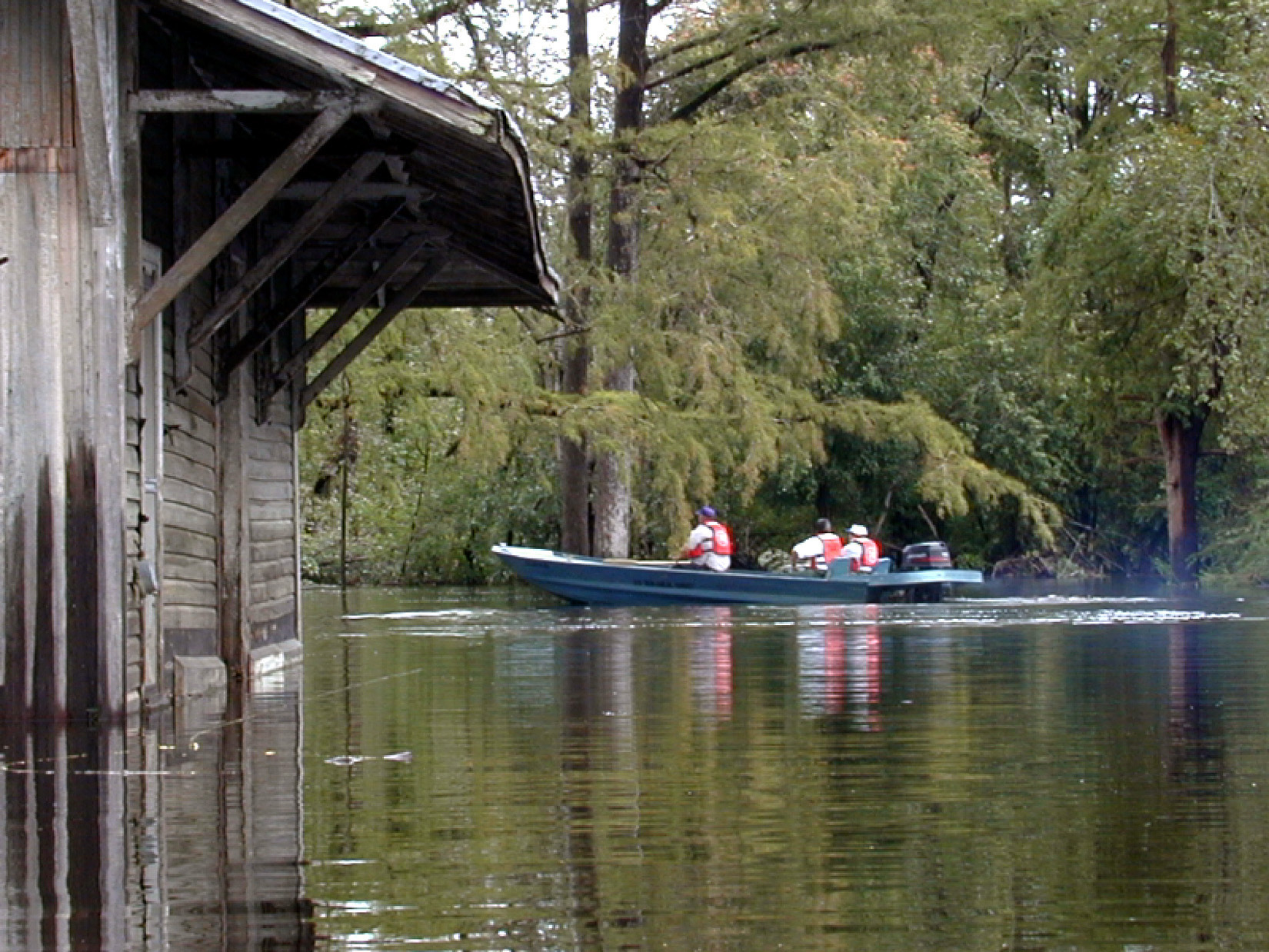
US Geologic Survey team measuring water flow on the Trent River.

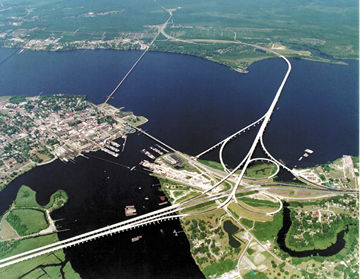
Aerial photograph of the confluence of the Trent and Neuse Rivers. East is up. The city of New Bern is on the left. The unincorporated community of James City is to the lower right. The Trent flows from the bottom center of the picture.

== See also ==
- List of rivers of North Carolina
