= Little Hell Creek (Trent River tributary) =

Stream in North Carolina, USA

Little Hell Creek Tributary to Trent River
- Location of Little Hell Creek mouth Little Hell Creek (Trent River tributary) (the United States)

Location
- Country: United States
- State: North Carolina
- County: Jones

Physical characteristics
- Source: Mundine Branch divide
  - location: about 2 miles west of Ravenswood, North Carolina
  - coordinates: 34°58′16″N 077°16′09″W
  - elevation: 38 ft (12 m)
- Mouth: Trent River
  - location: about 1.5 miles west-northwest of Pollocksville, North Carolina
  - coordinates: 35°00′48″N 077°15′17″W
  - elevation: 0 ft (0 m)
- Length: 5.88 mi (9.46 km)
- Basin size: 7.81 square miles (20.2 km^{2})
- Discharge
  - location: Trent River
  - average: 12.00 cu ft/s (0.340 m^{3}/s) at mouth with Trent River

Basin features
- Progression: Trent River → Neuse River → Pamlico Sound → Atlantic Ocean
- River system: Neuse River
- Tributaries
  - left: unnamed tributaries
  - right: unnamed tributaries
- Bridges: Lees Chapel Road, NC 58

Little Hell Creek is a 5.88 mi (9.46 km) long 2nd order tributary to the Trent River in Jones County, North Carolina.

== Course ==
Little Hell Creek rises about 2 miles east of Ravenswood, North Carolina and then flows north to join the Trent River about 1.5 miles west-northwest of Pollocksville.

== Watershed ==
Little Hell Creek drains 7.81 square miles (20.2 km^{2}) of area, receives about 54.3 in/year of precipitation, has a wetness index of 616.36, and is about 9% forested.

== See also ==
- List of rivers of North Carolina
