= Long Branch (Trent River tributary) =

Stream in North Carolina, USA

Long Branch Tributary to Trent River
- Location of Long Branch mouth Long Branch (Trent River tributary) (the United States)

Location
- Country: United States
- State: North Carolina
- County: Jones

Physical characteristics
- Source: Bachelor Creek divide
  - location: about 5 miles northwest of Jones Corner, North Carolina
  - coordinates: 35°04′39″N 077°16′08″W
  - elevation: 38 ft (12 m)
- Mouth: Trent River
  - location: about 1.5 miles northwest of Oak Grove, North Carolina
  - coordinates: 35°04′39″N 077°15′25″W
  - elevation: 3 ft (0.91 m)
- Length: 2.83 mi (4.55 km)
- Basin size: 2.92 square miles (7.6 km^{2})
- Discharge
  - location: Trent River
  - average: 4.35 cu ft/s (0.123 m^{3}/s) at mouth with Trent River

Basin features
- Progression: generally southwest
- River system: Neuse River
- Tributaries
  - left: unnamed tributaries
  - right: unnamed tributaries
- Bridges: Ben Banks Road, Ten Mile Fork Road

Long Branch is a 2.83 mi (4.55 km) long 2nd order tributary to the Trent River in Jones County, North Carolina, United States.

== Course ==
Long Branch rises about 5 miles northwest of Jones Corner, North Carolina and then flows southwest to join the Trent River about 1.5 miles northwest of Oak Grove.

== Watershed ==
Long Branch drains 2.92 square miles (7.6 km^{2}) of area, receives about 53.8 in/year of precipitation, has a wetness index of 561.31, and is about 21% forested.

== See also ==
- List of rivers of North Carolina
