= Mill Creek (Trent River tributary) =

Stream in North Carolina, USA

Mill Creek Tributary to Trent River
- Location of Mill Creek mouth Mill Creek (Trent River tributary) (the United States)

Location
- Country: United States
- State: North Carolina
- County: Jones
- City: Pollocksville

Physical characteristics
- Source: Island Creek divide
  - location: about 4 miles east of Pollocksville, North Carolina
  - coordinates: 34°59′37″N 077°07′04″W
  - elevation: 37 ft (11 m)
- Mouth: Trent River
  - location: Pollocksville, North Carolina
  - coordinates: 35°00′28″N 077°12′51″W
  - elevation: 0 ft (0 m)
- Length: 9.73 mi (15.66 km)
- Basin size: 36.02 square miles (93.3 km^{2})
- Discharge
  - location: Trent River
  - average: 52.30 cu ft/s (1.481 m^{3}/s) at mouth with Trent River

Basin features
- Progression: Trent River → Neuse River → Pamlico Sound → Atlantic Ocean
- River system: Neuse River
- Tributaries
  - left: Goshen Branch
  - right: unnamed tributaries
- Bridges: Mill Creek Road, Beaufort Road

Mill Creek is a 9.73 mi (15.66 km) long third-order tributary of the Trent River in Jones County, North Carolina.

== Course ==
Mill Creek rises about 4 mi (6.4 km) east of Pollocksville, North Carolina in Croatan National Forest and then flows southwest then turns northwest to join the Trent River at Pollocksville.

== Watershed ==
Mill Creek drains 36.02 square miles (93.3 km^{2}) of area, receives about 55.0 in/year of precipitation, has a wetness index of 642.15, and is about 17% forested.

== See also ==
- List of rivers of North Carolina
