= Scott Creek (Trent River tributary) =

Stream in North Carolina, USA

Scott Creek Tributary to Trent River
- Location of Scott Creek mouth Scott Creek (Trent River tributary) (the United States)

Location
- Country: United States
- State: North Carolina
- County: Jones

Physical characteristics
- Source: Bachelor Creek divide
  - location: about 3 miles northeast of Pollocksville, North Carolina
  - coordinates: 35°03′49″N 077°12′12″W
  - elevation: 36 ft (11 m)
- Mouth: Trent River
  - location: Jones Corner, North Carolina
  - coordinates: 35°02′54″N 077°11′09″W
  - elevation: 0 ft (0 m)
- Length: 2.35 mi (3.78 km)
- Basin size: 2.57 square miles (6.7 km^{2})
- Discharge
  - location: Trent River
  - average: 3.87 cu ft/s (0.110 m^{3}/s) at mouth with Trent River

Basin features
- Progression: Trent River → Neuse River → Pamlico Sound → Atlantic Ocean
- River system: Neuse River
- Tributaries
  - left: unnamed tributaries
  - right: unnamed tributaries
- Bridges: US 17

Scott Creek is a 2.35 mi (3.78 km) long 1st order tributary to the Trent River in Jones County, North Carolina.

== Course ==
Scott Creek rises at Jones Corner, North Carolina and then flows southeast to join the Trent River about 3 miles northeast of Pollocksville.

== Watershed ==
Scott Creek drains 2.57 square miles (6.7 km^{2}) of area, receives about 54.0 in/year of precipitation, has a wetness index of 547.11, and is about 36% forested.

== See also ==
- List of rivers of North Carolina
