= French Branch (Trent River tributary) =

Stream in North Carolina, USA

French Branch Tributary to Trent River
- Location of French Branch mouth French Branch (Trent River tributary) (the United States)

Location
- Country: United States
- State: North Carolina
- County: Jones

Physical characteristics
- Source: Crooked Run divide
  - location: about 2 miles west of Olivers Crossroads, North Carolina
  - coordinates: 35°01′09″N 077°20′21″W
  - elevation: 48 ft (15 m)
- Mouth: Trent River
  - location: about 2 miles southeast of Trenton, North Carolina
  - coordinates: 35°03′05″N 077°19′20″W
  - elevation: 6 ft (1.8 m)
- Length: 3.19 mi (5.13 km)
- Basin size: 3.28 square miles (8.5 km^{2})
- Discharge
  - location: Trent River
  - average: 5.03 cu ft/s (0.142 m^{3}/s) at mouth with Trent River

Basin features
- Progression: Trent River → Neuse River → Pamlico Sound → Atlantic Ocean
- River system: Neuse River
- Tributaries
  - left: unnamed tributaries
  - right: unnamed tributaries
- Bridges: McDaniel Road, Spann Road

French Branch is a 3.19 mi (5.13 km) long 1st order tributary to the Trent River in Jones County, North Carolina.

== Course ==
French Branch rises about 2 miles west of Olivers Crossroads, North Carolina and then flows north to join the Trent River about 2 miles southeast of Trenton.

== Watershed ==
French Branch drains 3.28 square miles (8.5 km^{2}) of area, receives about 53.5 in/year of precipitation, has a wetness index of 596.29, and is about 14% forested.

== See also ==
- List of rivers of North Carolina
