= Crooked Run (Trent River tributary) =

Stream in North Carolina, USA

Crooked Run Tributary to Trent River
- Location of Crooked Run mouth Crooked Run (Trent River tributary) (the United States)

Location
- Country: United States
- State: North Carolina
- County: Jones
- City: Trenton

Physical characteristics
- Source: Great Creek divide
  - location: about 5 miles southwest of Olivers Crossroads, North Carolina
  - coordinates: 35°00′11″N 077°21′52″W
  - elevation: 47 ft (14 m)
- Mouth: Trent River
  - location: about 0.25 miles southeast of Trenton, North Carolina
  - coordinates: 35°03′30″N 077°20′46″W
  - elevation: 8 ft (2.4 m)
- Length: 7.75 mi (12.47 km)
- Basin size: 30.39 square miles (78.7 km^{2})
- Discharge
  - location: Trent River
  - average: 42.81 cu ft/s (1.212 m^{3}/s) at mouth with Trent River

Basin features
- Progression: Trent River → Neuse River → Pamlico Sound → Atlantic Ocean
- River system: Neuse River
- Tributaries
  - left: unnamed tributaries
  - right: unnamed tributaries
- Bridges: Francks Field Road, S Market Street

Crooked Run is a 7.75 mi (12.47 km) long 2nd order tributary to the Trent River in Jones County, North Carolina.

== Course ==
Crooked Run rises about 5 miles southwest of Olivers Crossroads, North Carolina and then flows north-northwest and then turns east to join the Trent River about 0.25 miles southeast of Trenton.

== Watershed ==
Crooked Run drains 30.39 square miles (78.7 km^{2}) of area, receives about 53.3 in/year of precipitation, has a wetness index of 647.73, and is about 16% forested.

== See also ==
- List of rivers of North Carolina
