= Island Creek (Trent River tributary) =

Stream in North Carolina, USA

Island Creek Tributary to Trent River
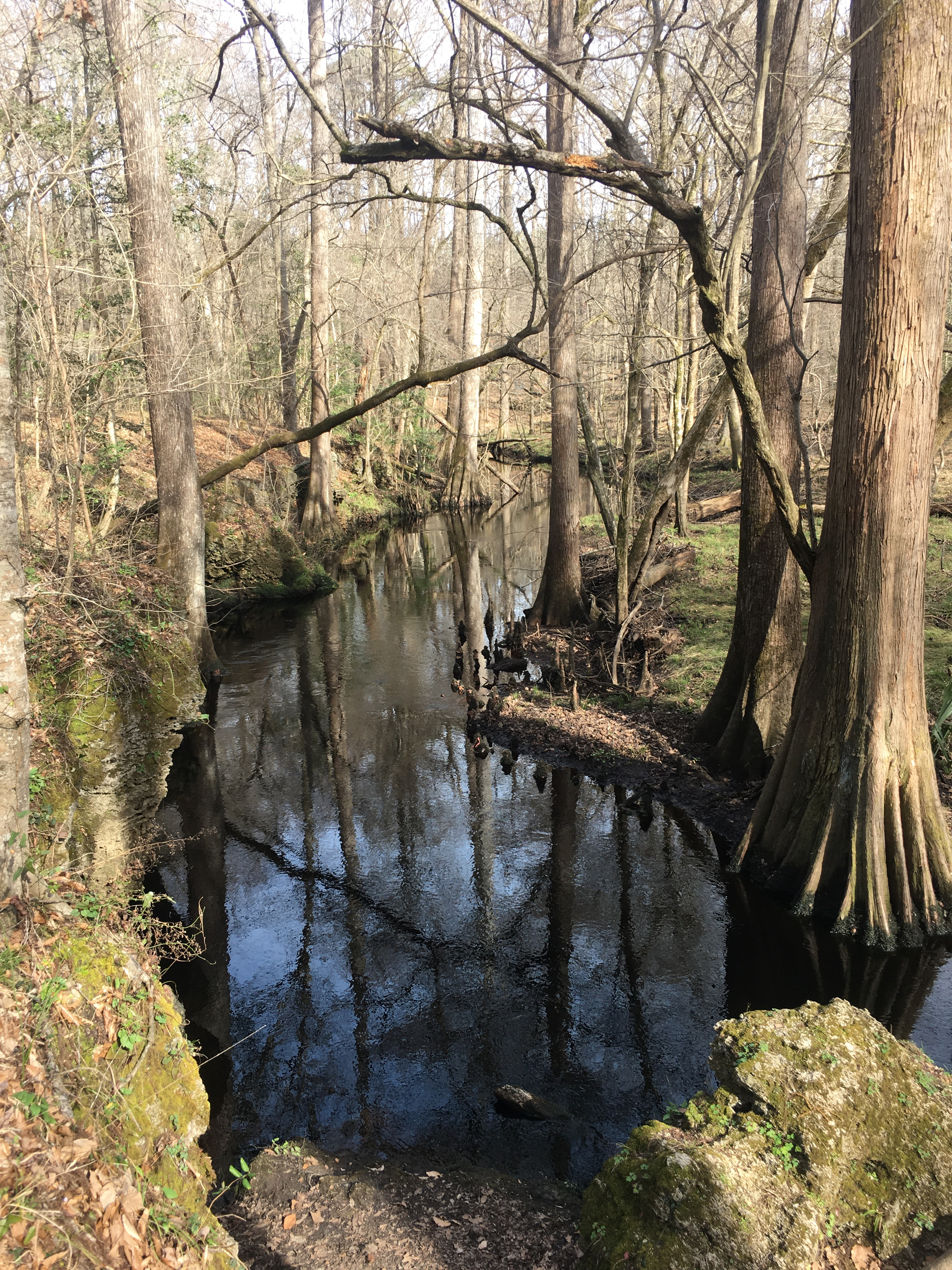
- Island Creek, as seen in Croatan National Forest

- Location of Island Creek mouth Island Creek (Trent River tributary) (the United States)

Location
- Country: United States
- State: North Carolina
- County: Jones

Physical characteristics
- Source: Mill Creek and East Prong Brice Creek divide
  - location: about 2 miles east of Pollocksville, North Carolina
  - coordinates: 35°01′13″N 077°06′36″W
  - elevation: 34 ft (10 m)
- Mouth: Trent River
  - location: River Bend, North Carolina
  - coordinates: 35°03′25″N 077°08′59″W
  - elevation: 0 ft (0 m)
- Length: 5.73 mi (9.22 km)
- Basin size: 11.75 square miles (30.4 km^{2})
- Discharge
  - location: Trent River
  - average: 17.27 cu ft/s (0.489 m^{3}/s) at mouth with Trent River

Basin features
- Progression: Trent River → Neuse River → Pamlico Sound → Atlantic Ocean
- River system: Neuse River
- Tributaries
  - left: Long Branch
  - right: unnamed tributaries
- Bridges: Island Creek Road

Island Creek is a 5.73 mi (9.22 km) long 2nd order tributary to the Trent River in Jones County, North Carolina, United States.

== Course ==
Island Creek rises about 2 miles east of Pollocksville, North Carolina in Croatan National Forest and then flows northerly to join the Trent River at River Bend, North Carolina.

== Watershed ==
Island Creek drains 11.75 square miles (30.4 km^{2}) of area, receives about 54.7 in/year of precipitation, has a wetness index of 565.10, and is about 45% forested.

== See also ==
- List of rivers of North Carolina
