= Mill Run (Trent River tributary) =

Stream in North Carolina, US

Mill Run Tributary to Trent River
- Location of Mill Run mouth Mill Run (Trent River tributary) (the United States)

Location
- Country: United States
- State: North Carolina
- County: Jones

Physical characteristics
- Source: Crooked Run divide
  - location: about 1 mile southwest of Olivers Crossroads, North Carolina
  - coordinates: 35°00′24″N 077°19′57″W
  - elevation: 40 ft (12 m)
- Mouth: Trent River
  - location: about 2 mile southeast of Olivers Crossroads, North Carolina
  - coordinates: 35°00′44″N 077°16′25″W
  - elevation: 3 ft (0.91 m)
- Length: 3.52 mi (5.66 km)
- Basin size: 11.84 square miles (30.7 km^{2})
- Discharge
  - location: Trent River
  - average: 17.69 cu ft/s (0.501 m^{3}/s) at mouth with Trent River

Basin features
- Progression: generally northeast
- River system: Neuse River
- Tributaries
  - left: unnamed tributaries
  - right: Beaverdam Branch
- Bridges: Olivers Cross Road, Davis Field Road, NC 58

Mill Run is a 3.52 mi (5.66 km) long 2nd order tributary to the Trent River in Jones County, North Carolina.

== Course ==
Mill Run rises about 1 mile southwest of Olivers Crossroads, North Carolina and then flows northeast to join the Trent River about 1 mile southeast of Olivers Crossroads.

== Watershed ==
Mill Run drains 11.84 square miles (30.7 km^{2}) of area, receives about 54.0 in/year of precipitation, has a wetness index of 617.78, and is about 18% forested.

== See also ==
- List of rivers of North Carolina
