= Island Creek =

Island Creek may refer to:

- Island Creek (Talbot County, Maryland)
- Island Creek (Trent River tributary), a stream in Jones County, North Carolina
- Island Creek (West Virginia), a stream
- Island Creek Pond, a lake in Massachusetts
- Island Creek Township, Jefferson County, Ohio
