= Trenton Historic District (Trenton, North Carolina) =

Historic district in North Carolina, United States

- U.S. National Register of Historic Places
- U.S. Historic district
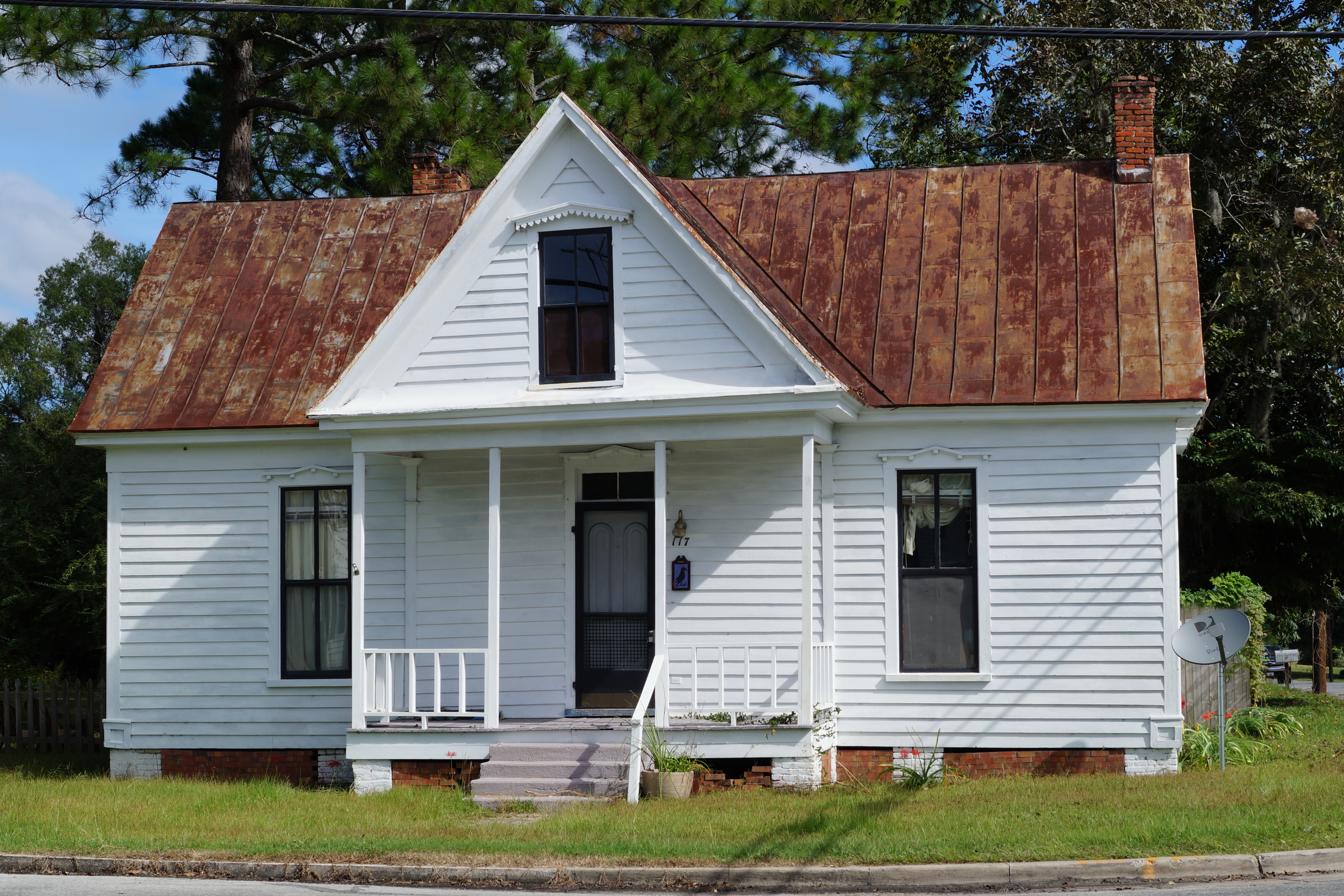
- House in the Trenton Historic District, September 2014

- Location within North Carolina Location within the United States
- Location: Roughly bounded by Trent, Lower and Pollock Sts., and Brock Mill Pond, Trenton, North Carolina
- Coordinates: 35°3′53″N 77°21′31″W
- Area: 300 acres (120 ha)
- Built: 1820
- Architectural style: Italianate, Gothic Revival, Federal
- NRHP reference No.: 74001357
- Added to NRHP: July 3, 1974

Trenton Historic District is a national historic district located at Trenton, Jones County, North Carolina. It encompasses 15 contributing buildings and 1 contributing site in the town of Trenton. It includes notable examples of Italianate, Gothic Revival, and Federal style architecture and buildings largely dating from the mid- to late-19th century. Located in the district is the separately listed Grace Episcopal Church. Other notable buildings include the Grace Episcopal Church Parish House, Jacob Huggins House (1820-1835), Smith House (c. 1820), Kinsey House, Franks House, Henderson House, McDaniel-Dixon House, the United Methodist Church, Trenton Pentecostal Holiness Church, the old jail, and Bank of Jones County (1908).

It was listed on the National Register of Historic Places in 1974.
