= Horse Branch (Trent River tributary) =

Horse Branch Tributary to Trent River
- Location of Horse Branch mouth Horse Branch (Trent River tributary) (the United States)

Location
- Country: United States
- State: North Carolina
- County: Lenoir

Physical characteristics
- Source: Hornpipe Branch divide
  - location: about 2 miles north of Nobles Mill, North Carolina
  - coordinates: 35°07′41″N 077°38′16″W
  - elevation: 32 ft (9.8 m)
- Mouth: Trent River
  - location: about 0.5 miles east of Nobles Mill, North Carolina
  - coordinates: 35°05′49″N 077°37′38″W
  - elevation: 21 ft (6.4 m)
- Length: 2.80 mi (4.51 km)
- Basin size: 2.69 square miles (7.0 km^{2})
- Discharge
  - location: Trent River
  - average: 3.79 cu ft/s (0.107 m^{3}/s) at mouth with Trent River

Basin features
- Progression: Trent River → Neuse River → Pamlico Sound → Atlantic Ocean
- River system: Neuse River
- Tributaries
  - left: unnamed tributaries
  - right: unnamed tributaries
- Bridges: Jesse Howard Road

Horse Branch is a 2.80 mi (4.51 km) long 1st order tributary to the Trent River in Lenoir County, North Carolina.

== Course ==
Horse Branch rises about 2 miles north of Nobles Mill, North Carolina and then takes a southerly course to join the Trent River about 0.5 miles east of Nobles Mill.

== Watershed ==
Horse Branch drains 2.69 square miles (7.0 km^{2}) of area, receives about 51.3 in/year of precipitation, has a wetness index of 575.21, and is about 32% forested.
