= Beaverdam Creek (Trent River tributary) =

Stream in North Carolina, USA

Beaverdam Creek Tributary to Trent River
- Location of Beaverdam Creek mouth Beaverdam Creek (Trent River tributary) (the United States)

Location
- Country: United States
- State: North Carolina
- County: Jones

Physical characteristics
- Source: Bachelor Creek divide
  - location: about 2.5 miles northwest of Simmons Corner, North Carolina
  - coordinates: 35°07′58″N 077°16′04″W
  - elevation: 50 ft (15 m)
- Mouth: Trent River
  - location: about 2 miles northwest of Oak Grove, North Carolina
  - coordinates: 35°02′50″N 077°16′25″W
  - elevation: 3 ft (0.91 m)
- Length: 6.68 mi (10.75 km)
- Basin size: 7.80 square miles (20.2 km^{2})
- Discharge
  - location: Trent River
  - average: 11.06 cu ft/s (0.313 m^{3}/s) at mouth with Trent River

Basin features
- Progression: Trent River → Neuse River → Pamlico Sound → Atlantic Ocean
- River system: Neuse River
- Tributaries
  - left: unnamed tributaries
  - right: unnamed tributaries
- Bridges: Ten Mile Fork Road

Beaverdam Creek is a 6.68 mi (10.75 km) long 2nd order tributary to the Trent River in Jones County, North Carolina.

== Course ==
Beaverdam Creek rises about 2 miles northwest of Simmons Corner, North Carolina in Craven County and then flows south into Jones County to join the Trent River about 2 miles northwest of Oak Grove.

== Watershed ==
Beaverdam Creek drains 6.68 square miles (17.3 km^{2}) of area, receives about 53.3 in/year of precipitation, has a wetness index of 602.73, and is about 33% forested.

== See also ==
- List of rivers of North Carolina
