= Crooked Run =

Crooked Run may refer to:

- Crooked Run (Trent River tributary), a stream in Jones County, North Carolina
- Crooked Run (Catawissa Creek), in Schuylkill County, Pennsylvania
- Crooked Run (Monongahela River), in Allegheny County, Pennsylvania
- Crooked Run (Youghiogheny River tributary), a stream in Fayette County, Pennsylvania
