= Reedy Branch (Trent River tributary) =

Stream in North Carolina, USA

Reedy Branch Tributary to Trent River
- Location of Reedy Branch mouth Reedy Branch (Trent River tributary) (the United States)

Location
- Country: United States
- State: North Carolina
- County: Craven; Jones

Physical characteristics
- Source: Black Branch divide
  - location: about 3 miles south of Timothy Chapel, North Carolina
  - coordinates: 35°00′58″N 077°06′04″W
  - elevation: 33 ft (10 m)
- Mouth: Trent River
  - location: across the Trent River from Trent Woods, North Carolina
  - coordinates: 35°04′21″N 077°06′48″W
  - elevation: 0 ft (0 m)
- Length: 4.47 mi (7.19 km)
- Basin size: 5.79 square miles (15.0 km^{2})
- Discharge
  - location: Trent River
  - average: 8.82 cu ft/s (0.250 m^{3}/s) at mouth with Trent River

Basin features
- Progression: Trent River → Neuse River → Pamlico Sound → Atlantic Ocean
- River system: Neuse River
- Tributaries
  - left: unnamed tributaries
  - right: unnamed tributaries
- Bridges: Countyline Road, Murphy Road, Crump Farm Road

Reedy Branch is a 4.47 mi (7.19 km) long 1st order tributary to the Trent River in Craven County, North Carolina. This stream forms the boundary of Jones and Craven Counties for a large portion of its length.

== Course ==
Reedy Branch rises about 3 miles south of Timothy Chapel, North Carolina in Croatan National Forest and then flows north to join the Trent River across from Trent Woods.

== Watershed ==
Reedy Branch drains 5.79 square miles (15.0 km^{2}) of area, receives about 54.9 in/year of precipitation, has a wetness index of 583.01, and is about 23% forested.

== See also ==
- List of rivers of North Carolina
