= Walnut Creek (Neuse River tributary) =

Stream in North Carolina, USA

Walnut Creek Tributary to Neuse River
- Location of Walnut Creek mouth Walnut Creek (Neuse River tributary) (the United States)

Location
- Country: United States
- State: North Carolina
- County: Wake
- Cities: Cary; Raleigh

Physical characteristics
- Source: divide between Walnut Creek and Crabtree Creek
  - location: Cary, North Carolina
  - coordinates: 35°47′22″N 078°45′17″W
  - elevation: 485 ft (148 m)
- Mouth: Neuse River
  - location: Raleigh, North Carolina
  - coordinates: 35°45′03″N 078°31′55″W
  - elevation: 151 ft (46 m)
- Length: 17.93 mi (28.86 km)
- Basin size: 45.98 square miles (119.1 km^{2})
- Discharge
  - location: Neuse River
  - average: 49.58 cu ft/s (1.404 m^{3}/s) at mouth with Neuse River

Basin features
- Progression: Neuse River → Pamlico Sound → Atlantic Ocean
- River system: Neuse River
- Tributaries
  - left: Simmons Branch; Rocky Branch
  - right: Wildcat Branch; Big Branch
- Waterbodies: Lake Johnson; Lake Raleigh

Walnut Creek is a 17.93 mi (28.86 km) long 4th order tributary to the Neuse River in Wake County. Its source is Maynard Pond in south-central Cary, and it flows generally eastward through several small reservoirs, including Lake Cramer in Cary as well as Lake Johnson and Lake Raleigh in Raleigh, before reaching its confluence with the Neuse just south of Poole Road in East Raleigh. The course of the creek closely parallels Interstate 40, running mostly along the north side of the freeway.

The Walnut Creek Trail, a branch of the Capital Area Greenway, follows the length of Walnut Creek from Lake Johnson to its confluence, and is the second longest trail in the Greenway System. A large swampy wetland (which has been partially reclaimed by urban development), occupies the area around the last several miles of the creek; the Walnut Creek Wetland Center, operated by Raleigh Parks and Recreation, is dedicated to the study and preservation of the wetlands. The Coastal Credit Union Music Park, commonly known by its original name of Walnut Creek Amphitheater, is located near the wetland area near where the creek passes under the I-40/I-440 interchange.

== Variant names ==
According to the Geographic Names Information System, it has also been known historically as:

- Wall-nut Tree Creek

== Course ==
Walnut Creek rises in Maynard Pond in south-central Cary, North Carolina in Wake County and then flows east through Cary and Raleigh to join the Neuse River. Walnut Creek drains most of the southern areas of Raleigh, North Carolina.

== Watershed ==
Walnut Creek drains 45.98 square miles (119.1 km^{2}) of area and is underlaid by a number of geologic formations on its course east. These include the Carolina terrane, Crabtree terrane, Falls Leucogneiss, Raleigh terrane, and the Rolesville Batholith. The watershed receives about 46.8 in/year of precipitation, has a wetness index of 429.16 and is about 22% forested.

== See also ==
- List of rivers of North Carolina
