= Hebron Presbyterian Church =

Historic church in North Carolina, United States

- U.S. National Register of Historic Places
- U.S. Historic district
- Location within North Carolina Location within the United States
- Location: NC 1551 northwest side, 0.15 miles (0.24 km) northeast of the junction with NC 1554, near Pink Hill, North Carolina
- Coordinates: 35°3′44″N 77°46′57″W
- Area: 1.5 acres (0.61 ha)
- Built: 1890
- Architectural style: Late Gothic Revival
- NRHP reference No.: 95000144
- Added to NRHP: February 24, 1995

Hebron Presbyterian Church, also known as Sutton's Branch Church, is a historic Presbyterian church and national historic district located near Pink Hill, Duplin County, North Carolina. The district encompasses one contributing building and one contributing site. The church was built in 1890, and is a small one-story, front-gable, wood-frame Late Gothic Revival-style church. Also on the property is the contributing church cemetery with burials dating to 1902.

It was added to the National Register of Historic Places in 1995.
