= Bryan Lavender House =

Historic house in North Carolina, United States

- U.S. National Register of Historic Places
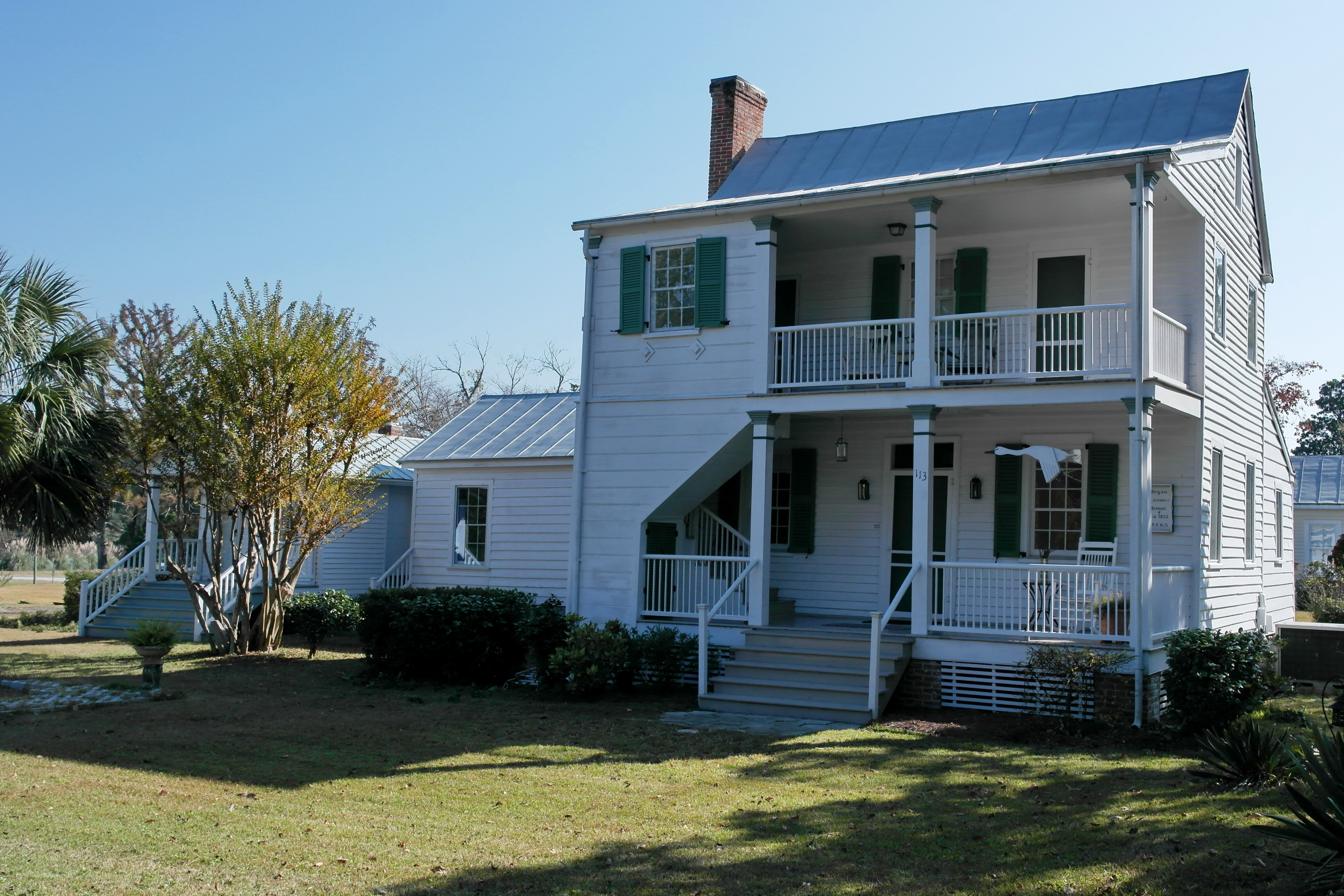
- Bryan Lavender House, October 2013

- Location within North Carolina Location within the United States
- Location: Off US 17 South of Trent River Bridge, Pollocksville, North Carolina
- Coordinates: 35°0′31″N 77°13′10″W
- Area: less than one acre
- Built: c. 1825
- Architectural style: Federal
- NRHP reference No.: 85000904
- Added to NRHP: April 25, 1985

Bryan Lavender House, also known as the Roscoe Barrus House, is a historic home located at Pollocksville, Jones County, North Carolina. It was built about 1825, and is a two-story, three-bay, hall and parlor plan Federal style frame dwelling. It rests on a brick pier foundation and has a gable roof. The front facade features a two-tier engaged porch with an enclosed end exterior stair.

It was listed on the National Register of Historic Places in 1985.
