= Bear Creek (Neuse River tributary) =

Bear Creek Bear Creek
- Location within North Carolina

Location
- Country: United States
- State: North Carolina
- Counties: Wayne, Lenoir

Physical characteristics
- Source
  - location: Bear Creek W/S Lake #3
  - coordinates: 35.414082°N 77.879703°W
- Mouth
  - coordinates: 35.232176°N 77.778741°W

Basin features
- River system: Neuse River

Bear Creek is a tributary of the Neuse River in North Carolina, USA. It drains an area of intensive agriculture, and is heavily polluted with nitrates.

== Location ==
Bear Creek is a tributary of the 275 miles (443 km) Neuse River, the largest river in North Carolina. The creek rises in the east of Wayne County, North Carolina, Wills Pond to the north of New Hope Road impounds Old Mill Branch, a tributary of Bear Creek that enters from the right (west) near the creek's headwaters. Further north Bear Creek W/S Lake Number Three impounds the headwaters. The creek flows southeast on the county line between Wayne and Greene counties, it enters northwest Lenoir County and flows southeast to the Neuse River. Bear Creek flows south under U.S. Route 70 between Goldsboro and Kinston.

The creek is named in local records as early as 1742. Originally a bottom land swamp, it was drained by canals to allow farming in the early 20th century. Bear Creek today drains an agricultural watershed, including crops and intensive animal farming. Land use in the watershed is 67% agriculture, 25% forest, 5% water or wetland and 3% urban. The creek is primarily fed by groundwater.

== Restoration efforts ==
The creek receives high levels nitrate from frequent runoff of surface water. Nitrogen delivery into the stream is enhanced by using tile drains to channelize runoff. Bear Creek was continuously monitored from May 2002 to May 2003. Drainage ditches in the watershed sometimes had nitrate concentrations above 10 mg/L. Nitrate yields in the creek exceeded 810 kg N km^{−2}. In an effort to restore the creek's natural functions, more than 3 miles (4.8 km) of drainage canals were backfilled in the 180 acres (73 ha) Bear Creek-Sleepy Creek Core Restoration Area. The large earthen levees were removed and replaced by lower, more natural structures to retain water. The area was then planted with almost 50,000 young trees in 2001.

== Sources ==
- "Background", The Neuse River Basin
- Bear Creek Mitigation Complex – Lenoir County, NC, Restoration Systems LLC
- Bucci, John; Szempruch, Anthony; Caldwell, Jane; Ellis, Joseph; Levine, Jay (2014), "Seasonal Changes in Microbial Community Structure in Freshwater Stream Sediment in a North Carolina River Basin", Diversity, doi:10.3390/d6010018
- Northeast Goldsboro Quadrangle : North Carolina-Wayne Co. (PDF), USGS: United States Geological Survey, 2013
- Powell, William S.; Hill, Michael (June 15, 2010), The North Carolina Gazetteer, 2nd Ed: A Dictionary of Tar Heel Places and Their History, Univ of North Carolina Press, ISBN 978-0-8078-9829-1
- Usry, Brian Patrick (2006), Nitrogen Loading in the Neuse River Basin, North Carolina: The Rivernet Monitoring Program (PDF), North Carolina State University
