= Sanderson House (Pollocksville, North Carolina) =

Historic house in North Carolina, United States

- U.S. National Register of Historic Places
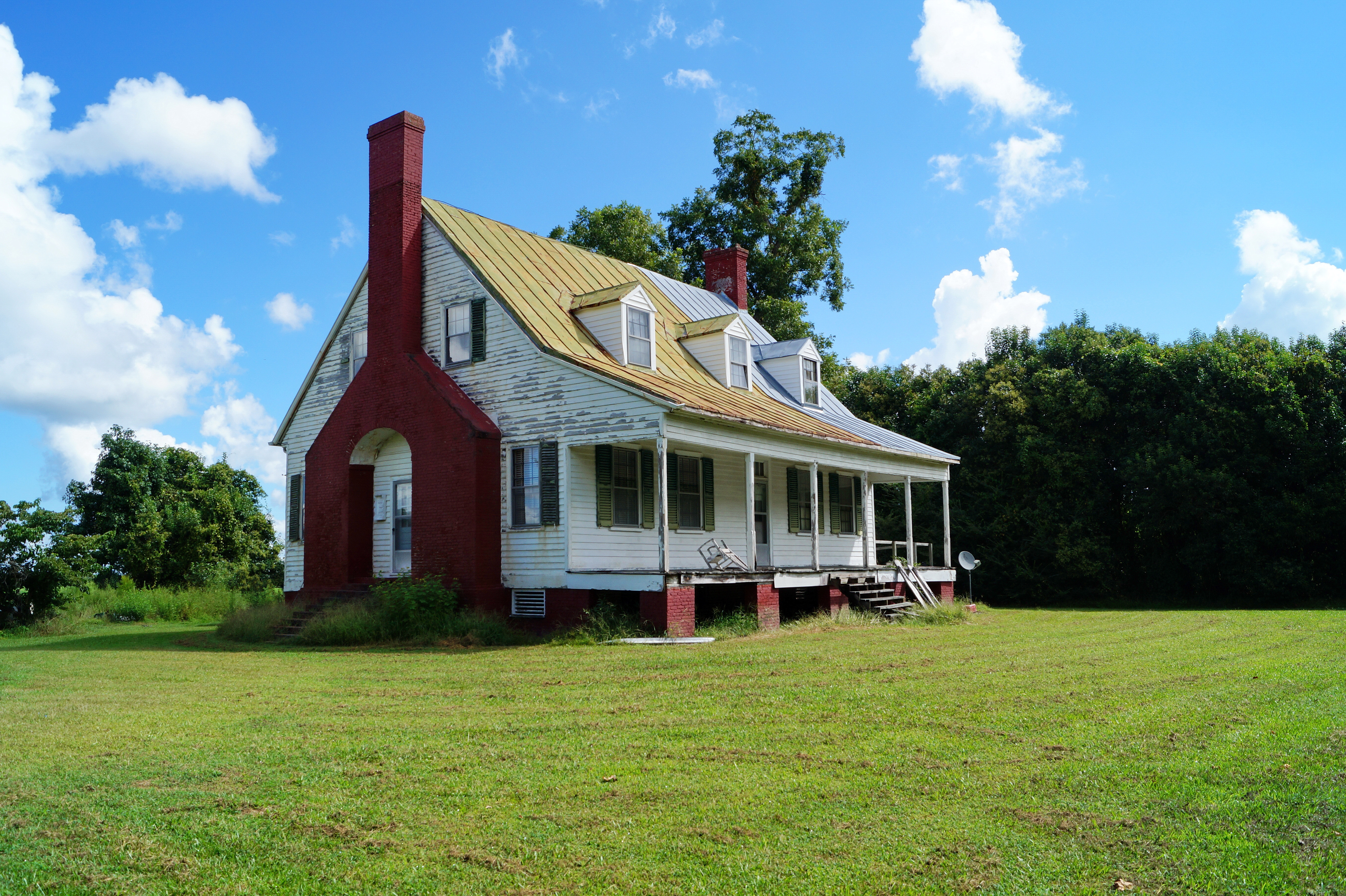
- Sanderson House, September 2014

- Location within North Carolina Location within the United States
- Location: SW of Pollocksville on SR 1115, near Pollocksville, North Carolina
- Coordinates: 34°59′03″N 77°16′33″W
- Area: 8 acres (3.2 ha)
- Built: c. 1798
- NRHP reference No.: 71000599
- Added to NRHP: December 16, 1971

Sanderson House is a historic home located near Pollocksville, Jones County, North Carolina. It was built about 1798, and is a small, 1 1/2-story, five-bay, frame dwelling. It rests on a high brick foundation, is sheathed in beaded weatherboards, and has a gable roof. It features an unusual chimney that starts as two chimneys and join between the first and second levels and rise in a single stack.

It was listed on the National Register of Historic Places in 1971.
