= Eagle Nest (Pink Hills, North Carolina) =

Historic house in North Carolina, United States

- U.S. National Register of Historic Places
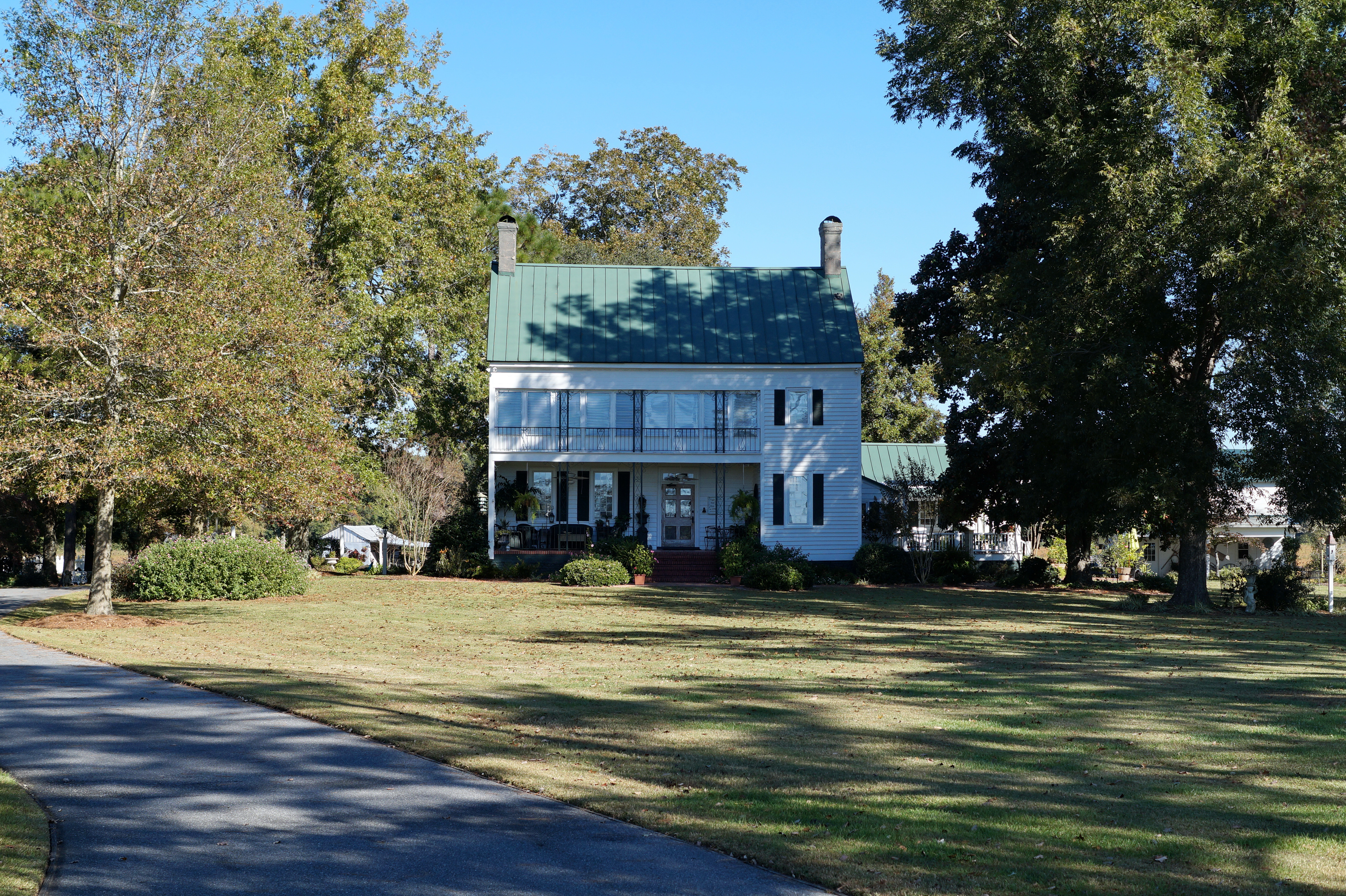
- Eagle Nest, October 2014

- Location within North Carolina Location within the United States
- Location: SE of Pink Hill off NC 41, Pink Hill, North Carolina
- Coordinates: 35°1′5″N 77°34′2″W
- Area: 9 acres (3.6 ha)
- Built: c. 1800
- Architectural style: Federal
- NRHP reference No.: 74001356
- Added to NRHP: November 13, 1974

Eagle Nest is a historic plantation house located near Pink Hill, Jones County, North Carolina. It was built about 1800 and is a two-story, four-bay by three-bay, Federal style frame dwelling. It rests on a brick foundation, is sheathed in weatherboard, and has a gable roof with exterior end chimneys. It has two one-story frame rear additions. The front facade features a two-tier engaged porch with an enclosed east end. Also on the property is a contributing smokehouse.

It was listed on the National Register of Historic Places in 1974.
