= Bryan–Bell Farm =

Historic house in North Carolina, United States

- U.S. National Register of Historic Places
- U.S. Historic district
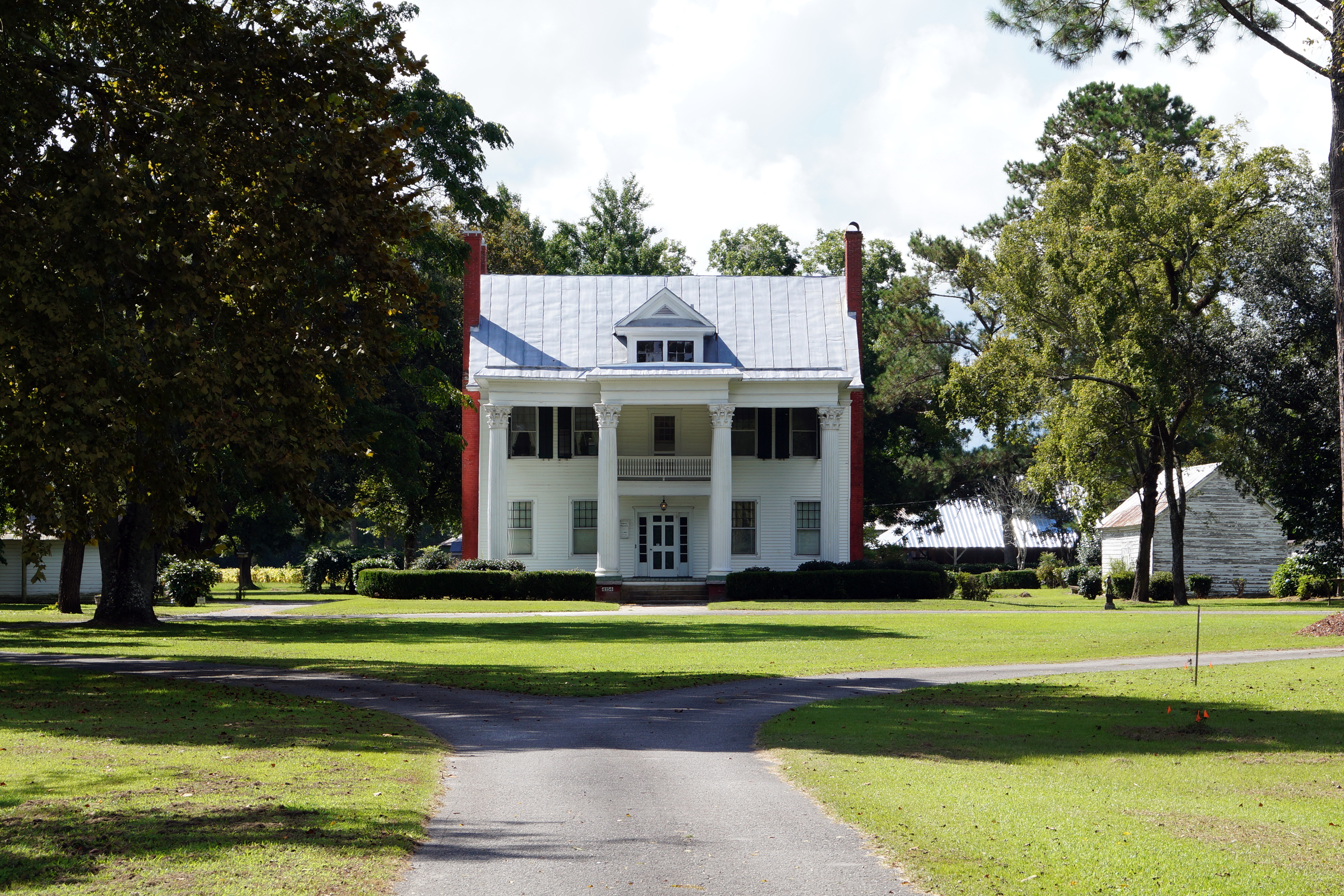
- Bryan–Bell Farm, September 2014

- Location within North Carolina Location within the United States
- Location: NC 58, 1 miles E of SR 1119, near Pollocksville, North Carolina
- Coordinates: 34°59′51″N 77°15′20″W
- Area: 2,251 acres (911 ha)
- Built: 1844, c. 1920
- Architectural style: Classical Revival, Federal
- NRHP reference No.: 89002155
- Added to NRHP: December 21, 1989

Bryan–Bell Farm, also known as Oakview Plantation, is a historic plantation house and farm complex and national historic district located near Pollocksville, Jones County, North Carolina. The district encompasses 25 contributing buildings, 2 contributing sites, and 2 contributing structures spread over seven areas. The main house was built about 1844 in the Federal style, and renovated in 1920 in the Classical Revival style. It is a 2 1/2-story, five-bay, frame residence with a monumental portico with Corinthian order columns. Among the other contributing resources are the farm landscape, office (1920s), seven pack houses (1920s), equipment building (c. 1939), storage building (c. 1930), barn (c. 1840), two chicken houses (c. 1923), stable / carriage house (c. 1920), two garages (c. 1930s), equipment shed (c. 1930), metal silo (c. 1930), hay barn (c. 1932), two tobacco barns (c. 1920), I-house (c. 1880), a log barn (c. 1890), a small plank building, farm house (c. 1900), and 19th century graveyard.

It was listed on the National Register of Historic Places in 1989.
