= Foscue and Simmons Plantations =

Historic houses in North Carolina, United States

- U.S. National Register of Historic Places
- U.S. Historic district
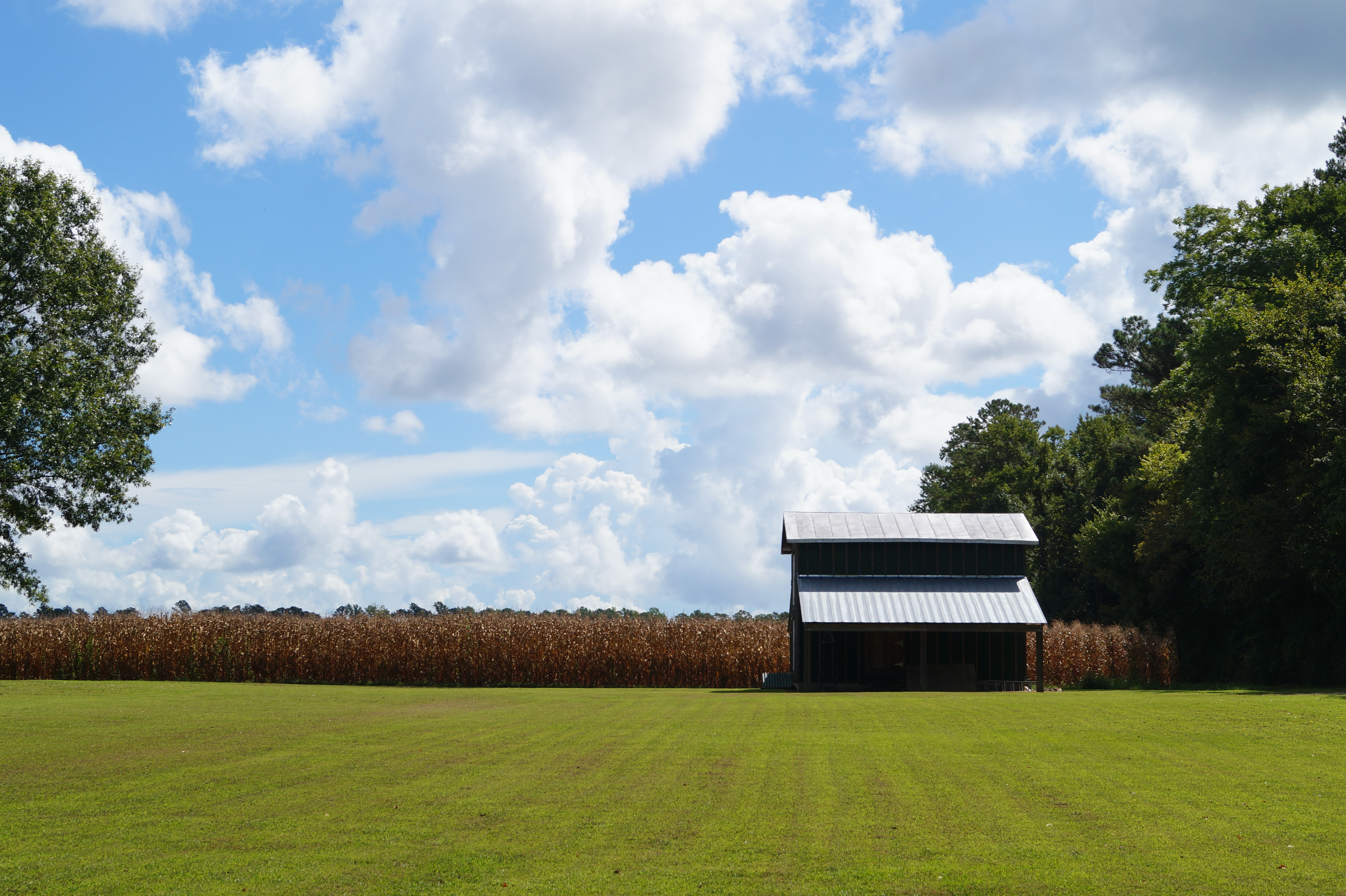
- Foscue and Simmons Plantation, September 2014

- Location within North Carolina Location within the United States
- Location: US 17, from Trent R. and Banks Rd., Pollocksville, North Carolina
- Coordinates: 35°02′21″N 77°12′01″W
- Area: 1,379 acres (558 ha)
- Built: c. 1821-1825
- Built by: Forbes, George
- Architectural style: Bungalow/craftsman, Italianate, Federal
- NRHP reference No.: 98000197
- Added to NRHP: October 7, 1998

Foscue and Simmons Plantations, also known as Foscue Plantation, is a historic plantation house and adjoining farm complexes and national historic district located near Pollocksville, Jones County, North Carolina. The district encompasses seven contributing buildings, four contributing sites, one contributing structure, and one contributing object. The Federal style Foscue Plantation House was built about 1821-1825 and is separately listed. Among the other contributing resources are the farm landscape, Foscue Cemetery (1849-1918), Brick Vault Site (1814-1853), four tobacco barns, Marl Pits/Ponds (c. 1940), Italianate style Simmons Cottage (c. 1870–1878), Simmons Tenant House #1 (c. 1920–1940), Marl Dredger (c. 1940), and bungalow style Christopher Stephens Simmons House (c. 1918–1920).

It was listed on the National Register of Historic Places in 1998.
