= Stoney Creek (North Carolina) =

- Location within North Carolina

Location
- Country: United States
- State: North Carolina
- County: Wayne County

Physical characteristics
- Mouth
  - location: Goldsboro, North Carolina
  - coordinates: 35.338378°N 77.994702°W
- Length: 11 miles (18 km)
- Basin size: 29.8 square miles (77 km^{2})

Basin features
- River system: Neuse River

Stoney Creek, or Stony Creek, is a watercourse in Wayne County, North Carolina, USA, that flows through the city of Goldsboro, North Carolina in its lower course before joining the Neuse River.

== Location ==
Stony Creek is named in local records as early as in 1756. In the Price map of 1808 it is called Rocky Creek. It is a tributary of the Neuse River. It is about 11 miles (18 km) long. The Stoney Creek watershed covers 29.8 square miles (77 km^{2}) in central Wayne County. The headwaters are near Wayne Executive Jetport at an elevation of about 138 feet (42 m). From there the creek drops about 4 to 6 feet per mile (.75 to 1.1 meters per kilometer) to its mouth, which is at an elevation of about 60 feet (18 m) above sea level.

== Land use ==
The upper part of the Stoney Creek watershed, north of New Hope Road, was mostly agricultural land or undeveloped as of 2004. Downstream, about 40% of the watershed is within the Goldsboro city limits and is used for housing, commerce, light industry and military purposes (Seymour Johnson Air Force Base). Stoney Creek Park is in Goldsboro south of Ash Street on the west side of Stoney Creek. It has a butterfly garden, a play area for children, an 18-hole disc golf course and a covered picnic area. Historically, development has spread from the lower areas to the upstream, and in the 2000s there has been growth in commercial and residential land use in the upper basin.

== Hydrology ==
Stoney Creek is in the inner coastal plain of North Carolina, an area with slow streams and large swamp areas. From upstream to downstream the creek's tributaries are Stoney Run, Howell Creek, Reedy Branch and Billy Branch. The upper watershed contains slowly moving blackwater streams, low lying wooded swamps and marsh floodplains. Often the streams flow through swampy areas. There are many small dams in the upper watershed made by farmers or beavers. About 42% of the floodplain is developed, 28% used for agriculture, 23% is forested and 6.1% is wetlands. The area is prone to flooding. Annual rainfall is about 50 inches (1,300 mm) with highest rainfall from June to September, usually from thunderstorms. Waste water is not discharged into the creek.

== Sources ==
- NC Ecosystem Enhancement Program (July 2004), Stoney Creek Watershed (PDF)
- Powell, William S.; Hill, Michael (2010-06-15), The North Carolina Gazetteer, 2nd Ed: A Dictionary of Tar Heel Places and Their History, Univ of North Carolina Press, ISBN 978-0-8078-9829-1
- Stoney Creek Park, EDPNC: Economic Development Partnership of North Carolina
