= Foscue Plantation House =

Historic house in North Carolina, United States

- U.S. National Register of Historic Places
- U.S. Historic district – Contributing property
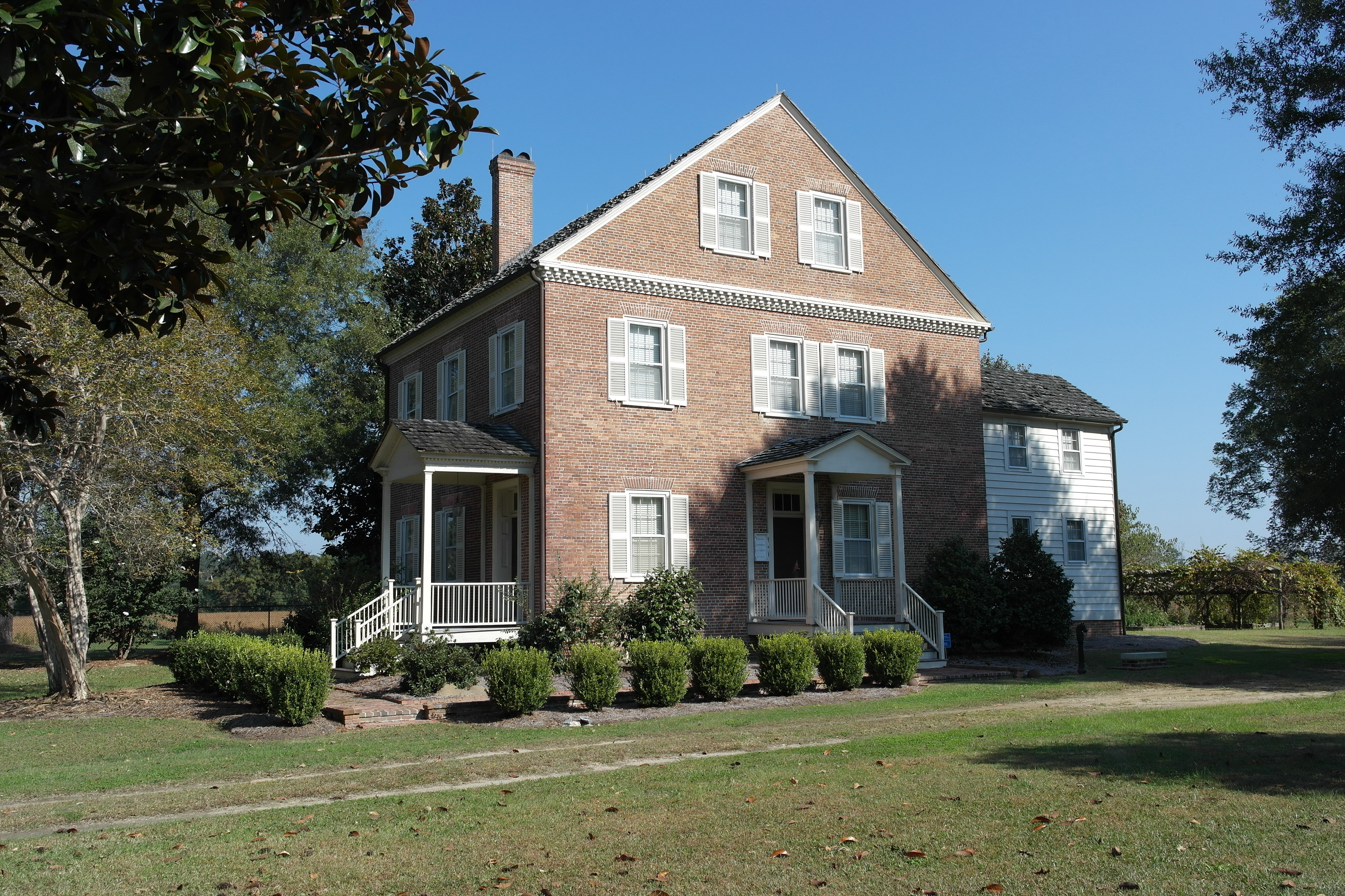
- Foscue Plantation House, October 2013

- Location within North Carolina Location within the United States
- Location: Off U.S. 17 near jct. with SR 1002, near Pollocksville, North Carolina
- Coordinates: 35°2′16″N 77°17′26″W
- Area: 1 acre (0.40 ha)
- Built: c. 1801
- Architectural style: New Bern side hall plan
- NRHP reference No.: 71000598
- Added to NRHP: November 19, 1971

Foscue Plantation House is a historic plantation house located near Pollocksville, Jones County, North Carolina. It was built about 1801, and is a two-story, three-bay, side hall plan brick dwelling. It rests on a full raised brick basement and has a gable roof.

It was listed on the National Register of Historic Places in 1971. The house is located in the Foscue and Simmons Plantations historic district.
