= Island Creek (Talbot County, Maryland) =

Stream in Talbot County, Maryland, U.S.

Coordinates: 38°40′35.5″N 76°6′30.5″W

Island Creek is a stream in Talbot County, Maryland, in the United States.

Island Creek was named from an island which was located near its mouth until it washed away in the 19th century.

== See also ==
- List of rivers of Maryland
