= Grace Episcopal Church (Trenton, North Carolina) =

Historic church in North Carolina, United States

- U.S. National Register of Historic Places
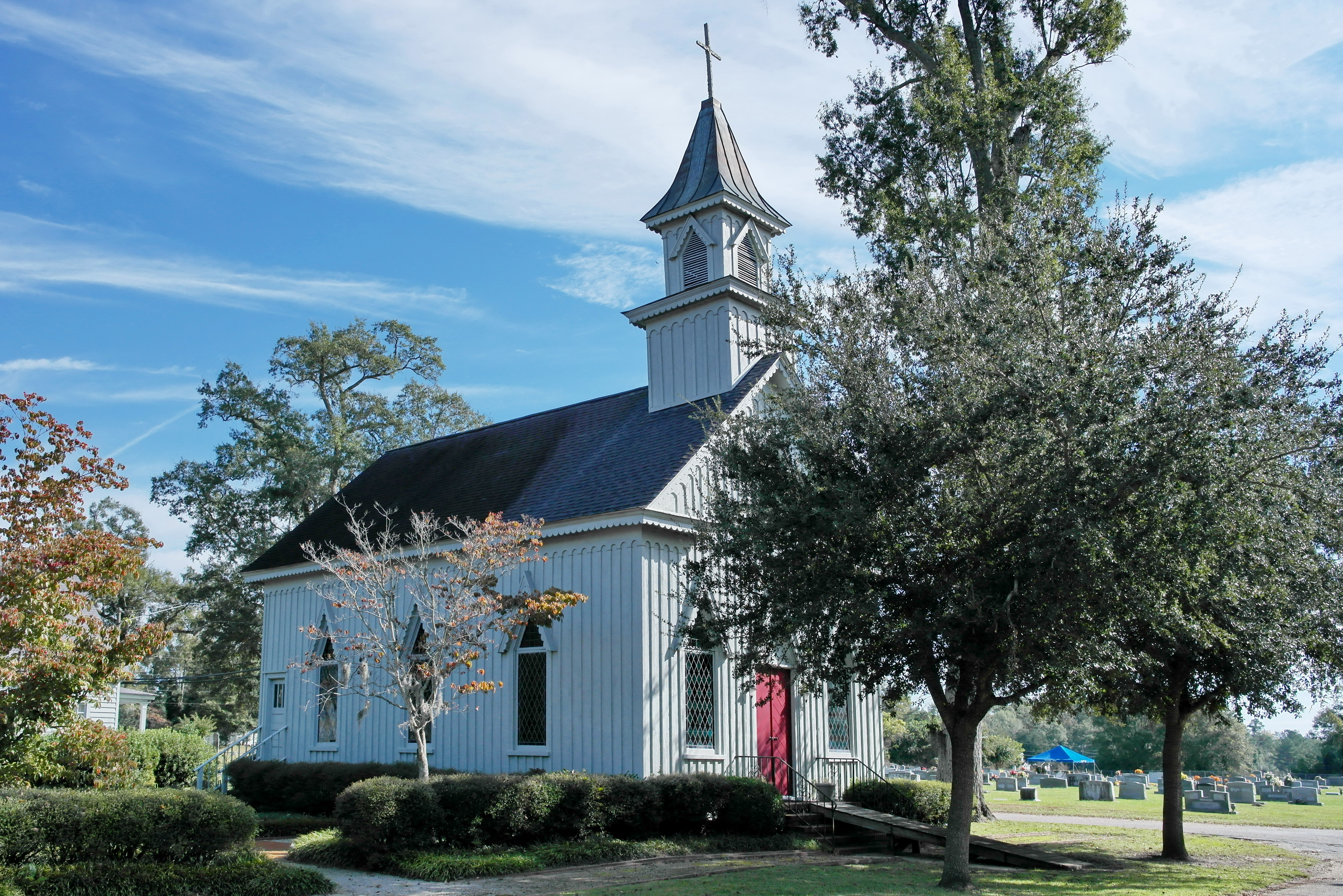
- Grace Episcopal Church, October 2013

- Location within North Carolina Location within the United States
- Location: Lake View Dr. and Weber St., Trenton, North Carolina
- Coordinates: 35°3′43″N 77°21′14″W
- Area: 1 acre (0.40 ha)
- Built: 1885
- Architectural style: Carpenter Gothic
- NRHP reference No.: 72000966
- Added to NRHP: January 20, 1972

Grace Episcopal Church is a historic Episcopal church located at Lake View Drive and Weber Street in Trenton, Jones County, North Carolina. It was built in 1885, and is a small, rectangular board-and-batten frame Carpenter Gothic style building. It rests on a low brick foundation and has a gable roof topped by a steeple. The church was consecrated on June 12, 1892.

It was listed on the National Register of Historic Places in 1972.
