= Oak Grove, Jones County, North Carolina =

Oak Grove, North Carolina
- Unincorporated community
- Location of Oak Grove in North Carolina Oak Grove, North Carolina (the United States)
- Coordinates: 35°02′03″N 77°14′37″W
- Country: United States
- State: North Carolina
- County: Jones
- Elevation: 30 ft (9.1 m)
- Time zone: UTC-5 (Eastern (EST))
  - Summer (DST): UTC-4 (EDT)
- ZIP code: 28573
- GNIS feature ID: 1014049

Oak Grove is an Unincorporated community in Jones County, North Carolina, United States. It is located on US 17, southwest of New Bern. Oak Grove Holf Airport is nearby.
