= Pink Hill, North Carolina =

- Mayor: Kyle Nettleton
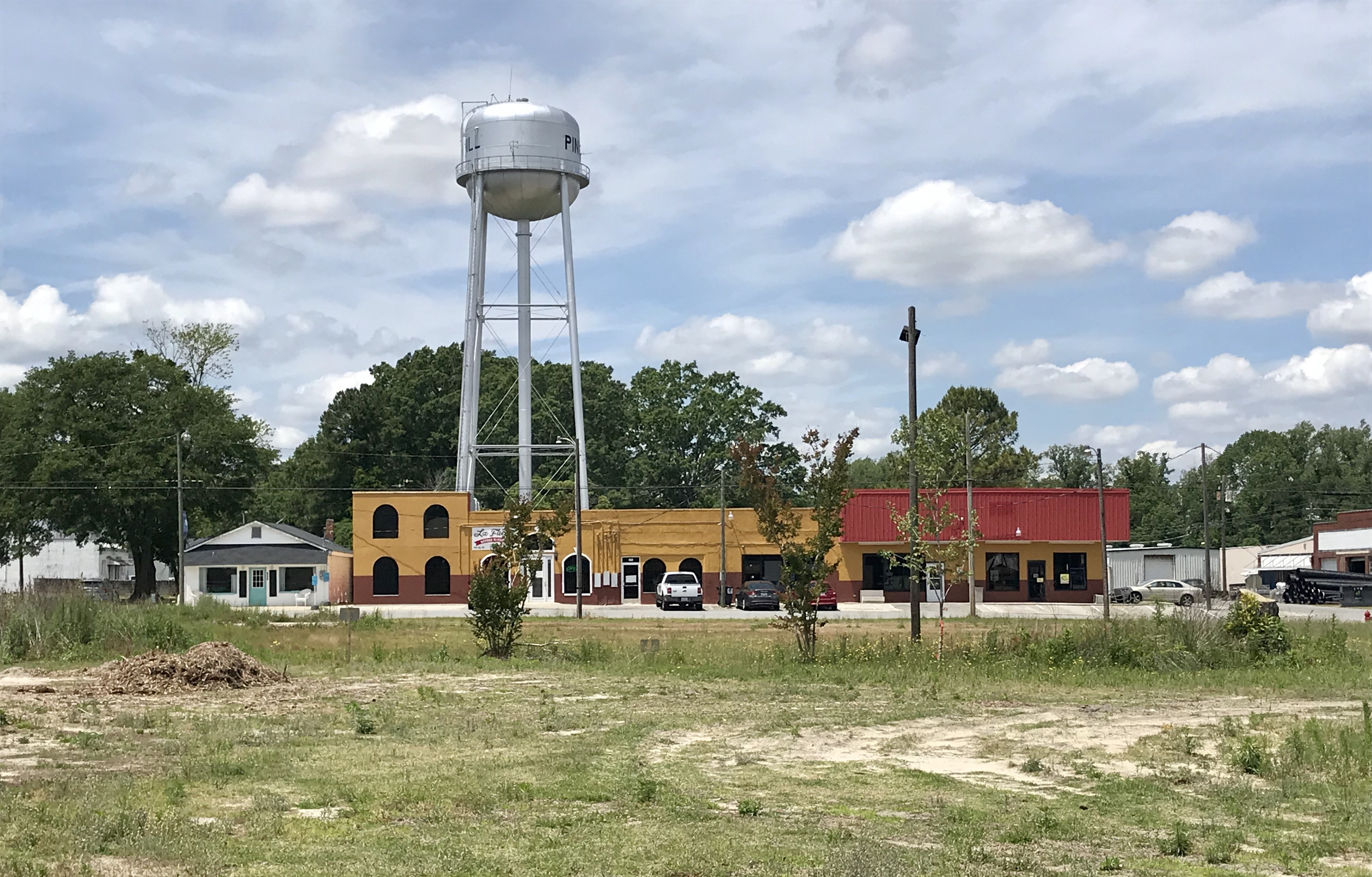
- Interactive map of Pink Hill, North Carolina
- Coordinates: 35°03′22″N 77°44′37″W
- Country: United States
- State: North Carolina
- County: Lenoir

Area
  - Total: 0.46 sq mi (1.20 km^{2})
  - Land: 0.46 sq mi (1.20 km^{2})
  - Water: 0 sq mi (0.00 km^{2})
- Elevation: 128 ft (39 m)

Population (2020)
  - Total: 451
  - Density: 971.0/sq mi (374.92/km^{2})
- Time zone: UTC-5 (Eastern (EST))
  - Summer (DST): UTC-4 (EDT)
- ZIP code: 28572
- Area code: 252
- FIPS code: 37-52400
- GNIS feature ID: 2407127
- Website: www.townofpinkhill.com

Pink Hill is a town in Lenoir County, North Carolina, United States. The population was 451 at the 2020 census.

== History ==
The town was incorporated in 1915.

== Geography ==
According to the United States Census Bureau, the town has a total area of 0.5 square miles (1.3 km^{2}), all land.

== Demographics ==
Historical population
Census	Pop.	Note	%±
1910	58		—
1920	166		186.2%
1930	188		13.3%
1940	307		63.3%
1950	386		25.7%
1960	457		18.4%
1970	522		14.2%
1980	644		23.4%
1990	547		−15.1%
2000	521		−4.8%
2010	552		6.0%
2020	451		−18.3%
U.S. Decennial Census

=== 2020 census ===
Pink Hill racial composition
Race	Number	Percentage
White (non-Hispanic)	263	58.31%
Black or African American (non-Hispanic)	90	19.96%
Other/Mixed	15	3.33%
Hispanic or Latino	83	18.4%

As of the 2020 United States census, there were 451 people, 247 households, and 144 families residing in the town.

=== 2000 census ===
As of the census of 2000, there were 520 people, 206 households, and 142 families residing in the town. The population density was 1,112.5 inhabitants per square mile (429.5/km^{2}). There were 233 housing units at an average density of 497.5 per square mile (192.1/km^{2}). The racial makeup of the town was 62.96% White, 25.91% African American, 13.63% Hispanic or Latino, 0.19% Asian, 0.77% Pacific Islander, 9.98% from other races, and 0.19% from two or more races.

There were 206 households, out of which 33.0% had children under the age of 18 living with them, 46.1% were married couples living together, 18.0% had a female householder with no husband present, and 30.6% were non-families. 26.7% of all households were made up of individuals, and 13.6% had someone living alone who was 65 years of age or older. The average household size was 2.53 and the average family size was 2.98.

In the town, the population was spread out, with 28.4% under the age of 18, 8.1% from 18 to 24, 27.1% from 25 to 44, 20.2% from 45 to 64, and 16.3% who were 65 years of age or older. The median age was 35 years. For every 100 females, there were 93.0 males. For every 100 females age 18 and over, there were 85.6 males.

The median income for a household in the town was $32,656, and the median income for a family was $39,583. Males had a median income of $25,536 versus $16,250 for females. The per capita income for the town was $19,730. About 16.3% of families and 20.2% of the population were below the poverty line, including 18.3% of those under age 18 and 7.7% of those age 65 or over.

== Arts and culture ==
The Eagle Nest and Hebron Presbyterian Church are listed on the National Register of Historic Places.

The Wilbur A. Tyndall Tractor Museum has a collection of John Deere, Massey, and other tractors from various years.

== Education ==
- Pink Hill Elementary School
