= River Bend, North Carolina =

- Town
- River Bend Town Hall

- Flag Seal

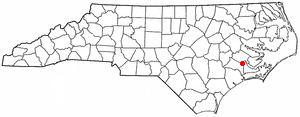
- Location of River Bend, North Carolina
- Coordinates: 35°04′18″N 77°09′01″W
- Country: United States
- State: North Carolina
- County: Craven

Area
  - Total: 2.87 sq mi (7.43 km^{2})
  - Land: 2.51 sq mi (6.51 km^{2})
  - Water: 0.36 sq mi (0.92 km^{2})
- Elevation: 7 ft (2.1 m)

Population (2020)
  - Total: 2,902
  - Density: 1,154.8/sq mi (445.89/km^{2})
- Time zone: UTC-5 (Eastern (EST))
  - Summer (DST): UTC-4 (EDT)
- FIPS code: 37-56710
- GNIS feature ID: 2407222
- Website: riverbendnc.org

River Bend is a town in Craven County. As of the 2020 census, River Bend had a population of 2,902. It is part of the New Bern, North Carolina Metropolitan Statistical Area.

== Geography ==
According to the United States Census Bureau, the town has a total area of 2.8 square miles (7.3 km^{2}), of which 2.5 square miles (6.5 km^{2}) is land and 0.2 square miles (0.52 km^{2}) (7.27%) is water.

== Demographics ==
Historical population
Census	Pop.	Note	%±
1990	2,408		—
2000	2,923		21.4%
2010	3,119		6.7%
2020	2,902		−7.0%
U.S. Decennial Census

=== 2020 census ===
River Bend racial composition
Race	Number	Percentage
White (non-Hispanic)	2,449	84.39%
Black or African American (non-Hispanic)	231	7.96%
Native American	4	0.14%
Asian	21	0.72%
Pacific Islander	4	0.14%
Other/Mixed	107	3.69%
Hispanic or Latino	86	2.96%

As of the 2020 census, River Bend had a population of 2,902. There were 1,379 households and 957 families residing in the town.

The median age was 58.2 years. 12.2% of residents were under the age of 18 and 38.5% of residents were 65 years of age or older. For every 100 females there were 88.2 males, and for every 100 females age 18 and over there were 85.0 males age 18 and over.

100.0% of residents lived in urban areas, while 0.0% lived in rural areas.

Of the 1,379 households, 14.9% had children under the age of 18 living in them. Of all households, 50.6% were married-couple households, 13.9% were households with a male householder and no spouse or partner present, and 30.9% were households with a female householder and no spouse or partner present. About 32.7% of all households were made up of individuals, and 21.1% had someone living alone who was 65 years of age or older.

There were 1,596 housing units, of which 13.6% were vacant. The homeowner vacancy rate was 4.4% and the rental vacancy rate was 7.3%.

=== 2000 census ===
As of the census of 2000, there were 2,923 people, 1,343 households, and 988 families residing in the town. The population density was 1,147.1 inhabitants per square mile (442.9/km^{2}). There were 1,477 housing units at an average density of 579.6 per square mile (223.8/km^{2}). The racial makeup of the town was 93.29% White, 5.71% African American, 0.10% Native American, 0.38% Asian, 0.07% Pacific Islander, 0.03% from other races, and 0.41% from two or more races. Hispanic or Latino of any race were 1.03% of the population.

There were 1,343 households, out of which 15.0% had children under the age of 18 living with them, 68.3% were married couples living together, 4.6% had a female householder with no husband present, and 26.4% were non-families. 23.2% of all households were made up of individuals, and 12.2% had someone living alone who was 65 years of age or older. The average household size was 2.08 and the average family size was 2.40.

In the town, the population was spread out, with 14.0% under the age of 18, 3.6% from 18 to 24, 18.4% from 25 to 44, 27.1% from 45 to 64, and 36.9% who were 65 years of age or older. The median age was 57 years. For every 100 females, there were 92.4 males. For every 100 females age 18 and over, there were 89.8 males.

The median income for a household in the town was $49,851, and the median income for a family was $54,316. Males had a median income of $44,602 versus $37,500 for females. The per capita income for the town was $27,990. About 0.4% of families and 2.3% of the population were below the poverty line, including 4.0% of those under age 18 and 1.0% of those age 65 or over.
