= Trenton, North Carolina =

- Town
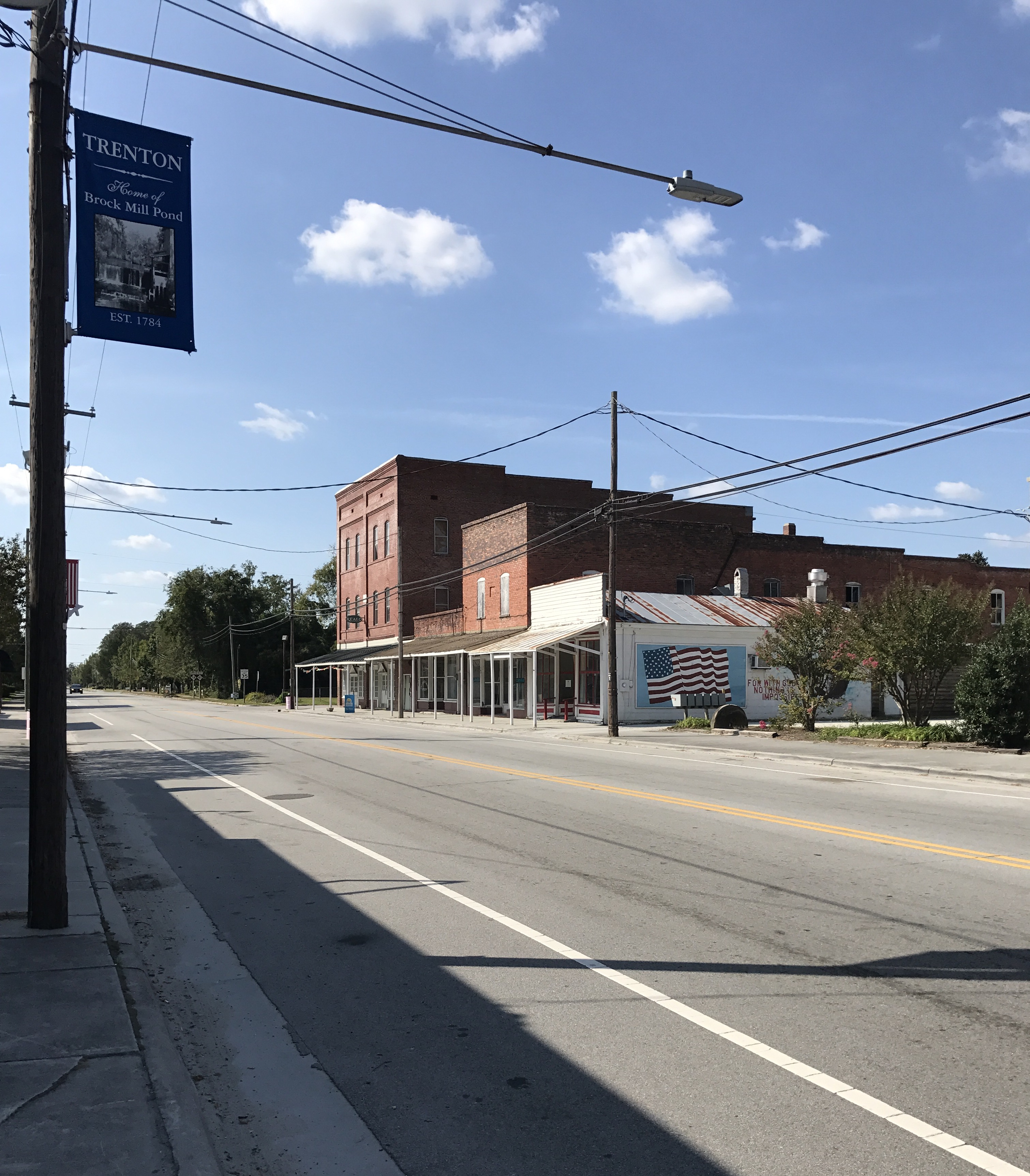
- Downtown Trenton

- Seal

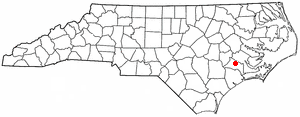
- Location of Trenton, North Carolina
- Coordinates: 35°03′49″N 77°21′19″W
- Country: United States
- State: North Carolina
- County: Jones

Area
  - Total: 0.25 sq mi (0.64 km^{2})
  - Land: 0.24 sq mi (0.63 km^{2})
  - Water: 0 sq mi (0.00 km^{2})
- Elevation: 26 ft (7.9 m)

Population (2020)
  - Total: 238
  - Density: 977.3/sq mi (377.32/km^{2})
- Time zone: UTC-5 (Eastern (EST))
  - Summer (DST): UTC-4 (EDT)
- ZIP code: 28585
- Area code: 252
- FIPS code: 37-68320
- GNIS feature ID: 2406751
- Website: townoftrenton.com

Trenton is a town in Jones County, North Carolina, United States. The population was 238 in 2020 census. It is the county seat of Jones County.

Trenton is part of the New Bern, North Carolina Micropolitan Statistical Area.

== History ==
Grace Episcopal Church and the Trenton Historic District are listed on the National Register of Historic Places.

== Geography ==
According to the United States Census Bureau, the town has a total area of 0.2 square miles (0.52 km^{2}), all land.

== Demographics ==
Historical population
Census	Pop.	Note	%±
1810	98		—
1880	149		—
1890	207		38.9%
1900	338		63.3%
1910	331		−2.1%
1920	488		47.4%
1930	500		2.5%
1940	431		−13.8%
1950	469		8.8%
1960	404		−13.9%
1970	539		33.4%
1980	294		−45.5%
1990	248		−15.6%
2000	206		−16.9%
2010	287		39.3%
2020	238		−17.1%
U.S. Decennial Census

=== 2020 census ===
Trenton racial composition
Race	Number	Percentage
White (non-Hispanic)	115	48.32%
Black or African American (non-Hispanic)	79	33.19%
Native American	3	1.26%
Asian	6	2.52%
Other/Mixed	24	10.08%
Hispanic or Latino	11	4.62%

As of the 2020 United States census, there were 238 people, 119 households, and 86 families residing in the town.

=== 2000 census ===
As of the census of 2000, there were 206 people, 95 households, and 66 families residing in the town. The population density was 1,075.0 inhabitants per square mile (415.1/km^{2}). There were 125 housing units at an average density of 652.3 per square mile (251.9/km^{2}). The racial makeup of the town was 69.90% White, 26.70% African American, 0.97% Asian, 0.49% Pacific Islander, 1.46% from other races, and 0.49% from two or more races. Hispanic or Latino of any race were 1.46% of the population.

There were 95 households, out of which 23.2% had children under the age of 18 living with them, 49.5% were married couples living together, 12.6% had a female householder with no husband present, and 29.5% were non-families. 26.3% of all households were made up of individuals, and 13.7% had someone living alone who was 65 years of age or older. The average household size was 2.13 and the average family size was 2.51.

In the town, the population was spread out, with 20.4% under the age of 18, 5.3% from 18 to 24, 22.3% from 25 to 44, 26.7% from 45 to 64, and 25.2% who were 65 years of age or older. The median age was 46 years. For every 100 females, there were 110.2 males. For every 100 females age 18 and over, there were 97.6 males.

The median income for a household in the town was $35,833, and the median income for a family was $40,156. Males had a median income of $26,750 versus $20,625 for females. The per capita income for the town was $14,774. About 18.8% of families and 20.2% of the population were below the poverty line, including 34.4% of those under the age of eighteen and 9.8% of those 65 or over.
