= Pollocksville, North Carolina =

- Town
- Town of Pollocksville
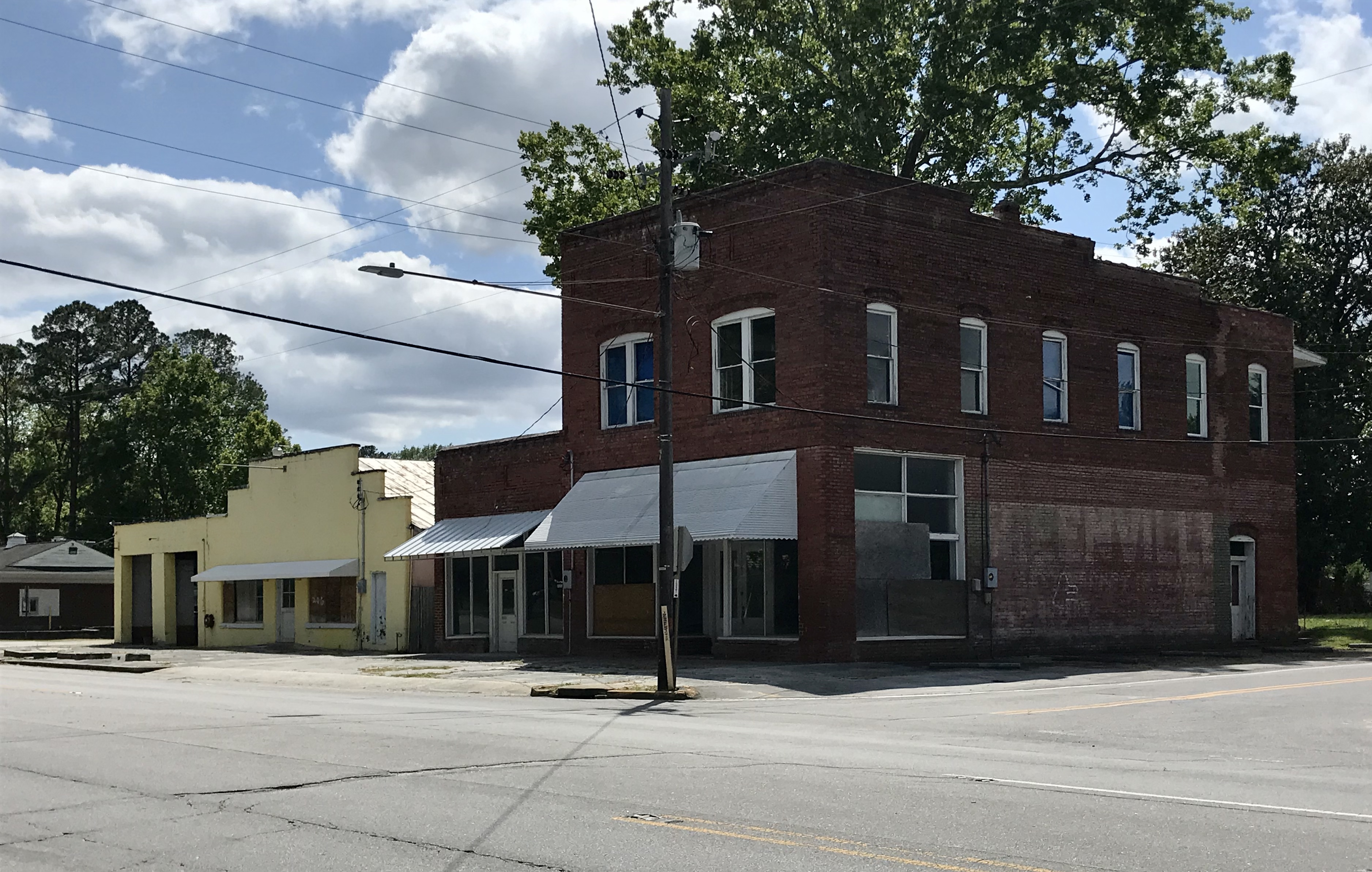
- Downtown Pollocksville

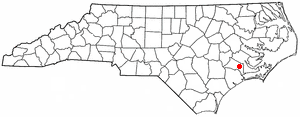
- Location of Pollocksville, North Carolina
- Coordinates: 35°00′20″N 77°13′17″W
- Country: United States
- State: North Carolina
- County: Jones

Area
  - Total: 0.33 sq mi (0.86 km^{2})
  - Land: 0.31 sq mi (0.81 km^{2})
  - Water: 0.015 sq mi (0.04 km^{2})
- Elevation: 23 ft (7.0 m)

Population (2020)
  - Total: 268
  - Density: 853.5/sq mi (329.54/km^{2})
- Time zone: UTC-5 (Eastern (EST))
  - Summer (DST): UTC-4 (EDT)
- ZIP code: 28573
- Area code: 252
- FIPS code: 37-53200
- GNIS feature ID: 2407143
- Website: townofpollocksville.com

Pollocksville is a town in Jones County, North Carolina, United States. The population was 268 at the 2020 census. It is part of the New Bern, North Carolina Micropolitan Statistical Area. It is situated on US 17 and Highway 58.

== History ==
The town derives its name from Thomas Pollock, a local landowner. The Bryan-Bell Farm, Foscue and Simmons Plantations, Foscue Plantation House, Bryan Lavender House, and Sanderson House are listed on the National Register of Historic Places.

== Geography ==
According to the United States Census Bureau, the town has a total area of 0.3 square miles (0.78 km^{2}), all land. Mill Creek, a tributary to the Trent River, has its confluence here.

== Demographics ==
Historical population
Census	Pop.	Note	%±
1880	53		—
1890	143		169.8%
1900	198		38.5%
1910	227		14.6%
1920	339		49.3%
1930	357		5.3%
1940	408		14.3%
1950	420		2.9%
1960	416		−1.0%
1970	456		9.6%
1980	318		−30.3%
1990	299		−6.0%
2000	269		−10.0%
2010	311		15.6%
2020	268		−13.8%
U.S. Decennial Census

=== 2020 census ===
Pollocksville racial composition
Race	Number	Percentage
White (non-Hispanic)	153	57.09%
Black or African American (non-Hispanic)	76	28.36%
Native American	3	1.12%
Other/Mixed	17	6.34%
Hispanic or Latino	19	7.09%

As of the 2020 United States census, there were 268 people, 117 households, and 48 families residing in the town.

=== 2000 census ===
As of the census of 2000, there were 269 people, 126 households, and 76 families residing in the town. The population density was 852.8 inhabitants per square mile (329.3/km^{2}). There were 153 housing units at an average density of 485.1 per square mile (187.3/km^{2}). The racial makeup of the town was 79.55% White, 20.07% African American, and 0.37% from two or more races. Hispanic or Latino of any race were 0.74% of the population.

There were 126 households, out of which 21.4% had children under the age of 18 living with them, 47.6% were married couples living together, 11.9% had a female householder with no husband present, and 38.9% were non-families. 38.1% of all households were made up of individuals, and 22.2% had someone living alone who was 65 years of age or older. The average household size was 2.13 and the average family size was 2.83.

In the town, the population was spread out, with 20.4% under the age of 18, 4.5% from 18 to 24, 20.8% from 25 to 44, 32.7% from 45 to 64, and 21.6% who were 65 years of age or older. The median age was 47 years. For every 100 females, there were 81.8 males. For every 100 females age 18 and over, there were 78.3 males.

The median income for a household in the town was $42,500, and the median income for a family was $51,250. Males had a median income of $36,429 versus $18,571 for females. The per capita income for the town was $22,528. About 7.4% of families and 9.1% of the population were below the poverty line, including 12.3% of those under the age of eighteen and 12.3% of those 65 or over.

== Media ==
Pollocksville was formerly served by the Jones Post, but as of January 2020 the town had no locally published newspaper.
