= Neuse River =

River rising in the Piedmont of North Carolina

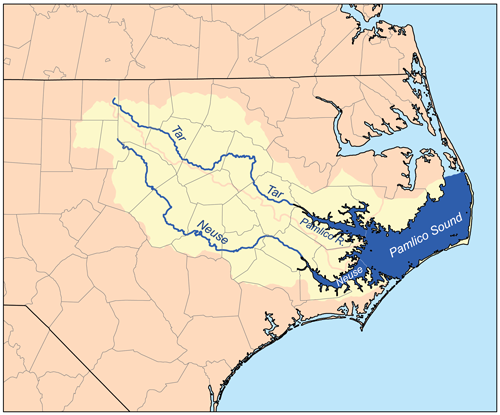
- A map of the Pamlico Sound watershed, including the Pamlico, Tar and Neuse rivers.

Location
- Country: United States
- State: North Carolina
- Region: South
- Cities: Raleigh, North Carolina, Smithfield, North Carolina, Goldsboro, North Carolina, Kinston, North Carolina, New Bern, North Carolina

Physical characteristics
- Source: Confluence of the Eno and Flat rivers
  - location: Durham, North Carolina, United States
  - coordinates: 36°05′42″N 78°48′49″W
  - elevation: 246 ft (75 m)
- Mouth: Pamlico Sound
  - location: Hobucken, North Carolina, United States
  - coordinates: 35°07′53″N 76°30′14″W
  - elevation: −11 ft (−3.4 m)
- Length: 443 km (275 mi)
- Basin size: 14,600 km^{2} (5,600 sq mi)

The Neuse River (/nuːs/ NOOSE, Tuscarora: Neyuherú·kęˀ Kì·nęˀ) is a river rising in the Piedmont of North Carolina and emptying into Pamlico Sound below New Bern. Its total length is approximately 275 miles (443 km), making it the longest river entirely contained in North Carolina. The Trent River joins the Neuse at New Bern. Its drainage basin, measuring 5,630 square miles (14,600 km^{2}) in area, also lies entirely inside North Carolina. It is formed by the confluence of the Flat and Eno rivers prior to entering the Falls Lake reservoir in northern Wake County. Its fall line shoals, known as the Falls of the Neuse, lie submerged under the waters of Falls Lake. The Neuse River Trail is a 34.5 miles (55.5 km) long greenway that stretches from Falls Lake Dam, Raleigh, North Carolina, to Legend Park, Clayton, North Carolina.

== Geography ==
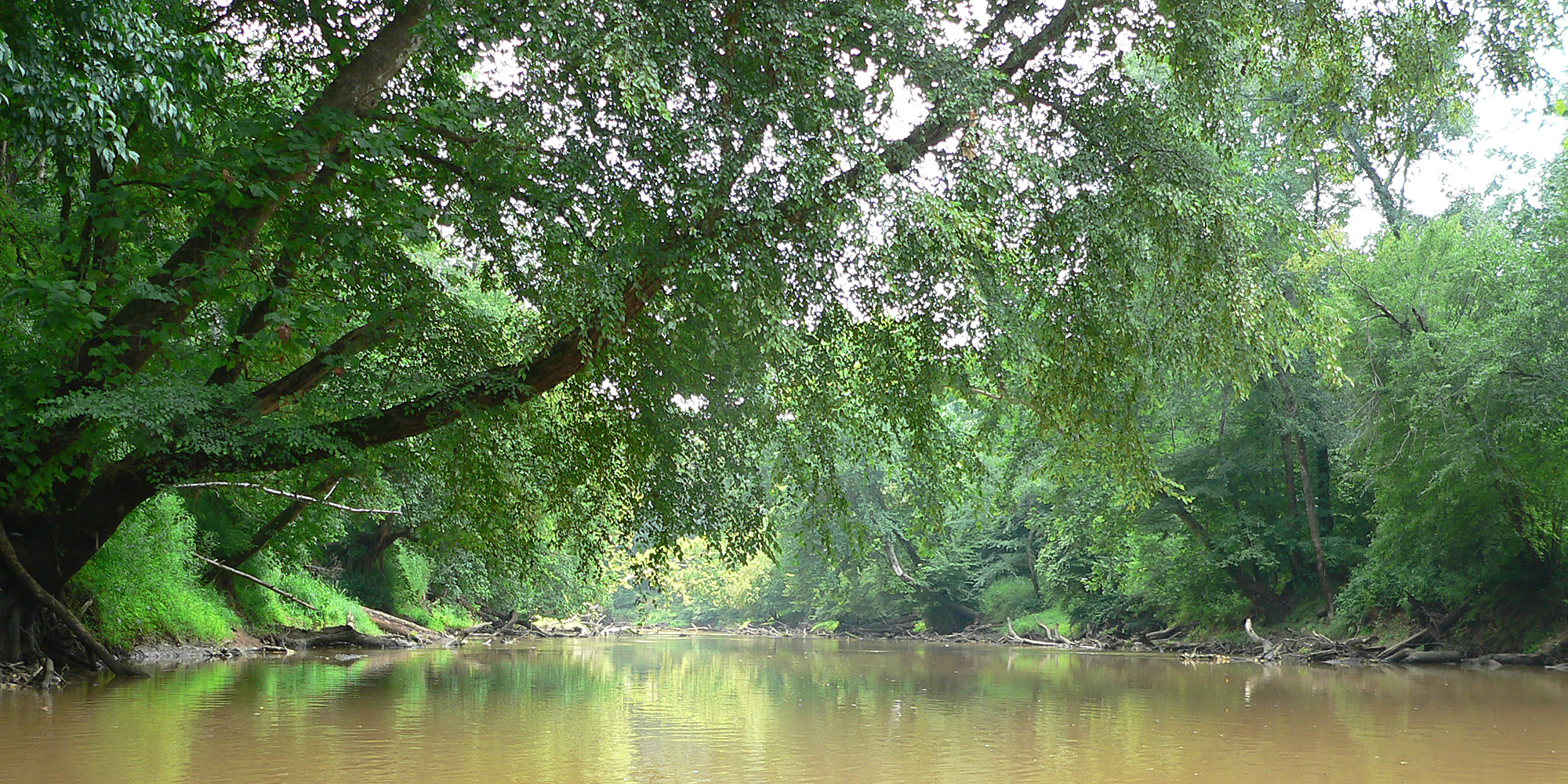
Along much of its length, the Neuse River is characterized by loose, sandy banks; muddy water year-round, and a dense tree canopy overhead.

The Neuse begins at the confluence of the Flat and Eno rivers near Durham, North Carolina. The river enters Pamlico Sound just east of Maw Point Shoal near Hobucken, North Carolina while en route to the Atlantic Ocean.

Typical of rivers in the Coastal Plain of North Carolina, the Neuse enters a basin of chocolate intermittent bottomland swamp on its journey towards its outlet. One interesting exception is the "Cliffs of the Neuse" area near Goldsboro, where the river cuts a narrow 30 m (90 ft) gorge through limestone and sandstone bluffs. The Neuse is prone to extremes in its flow carriage, often escaping its banks during wet periods, then reducing to a trickle that can be forded on foot during prolonged drought conditions.

The Neuse flows through parts of seven counties. Major cities and towns in proximity to the Neuse are Durham; Neuse Township; Raleigh, the capital of North Carolina; Smithfield; Goldsboro; Kinston and New Bern.

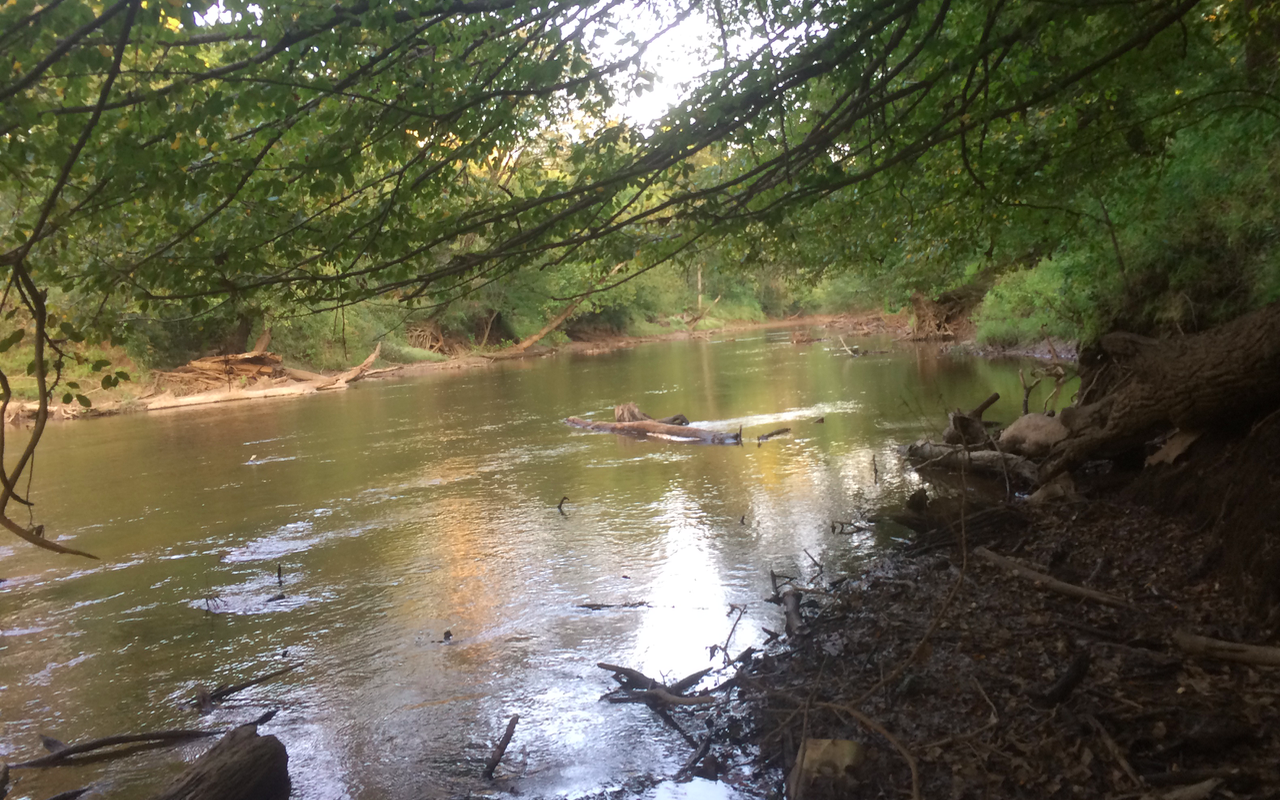
Neuse River in Raleigh

== History ==
For thousands of years before the Europeans arrived, different civilizations of indigenous peoples lived along the river. Many artifacts found along its banks have been traced to ancient prehistoric Native American settlements. Archaeological studies have shown waves of habitation.

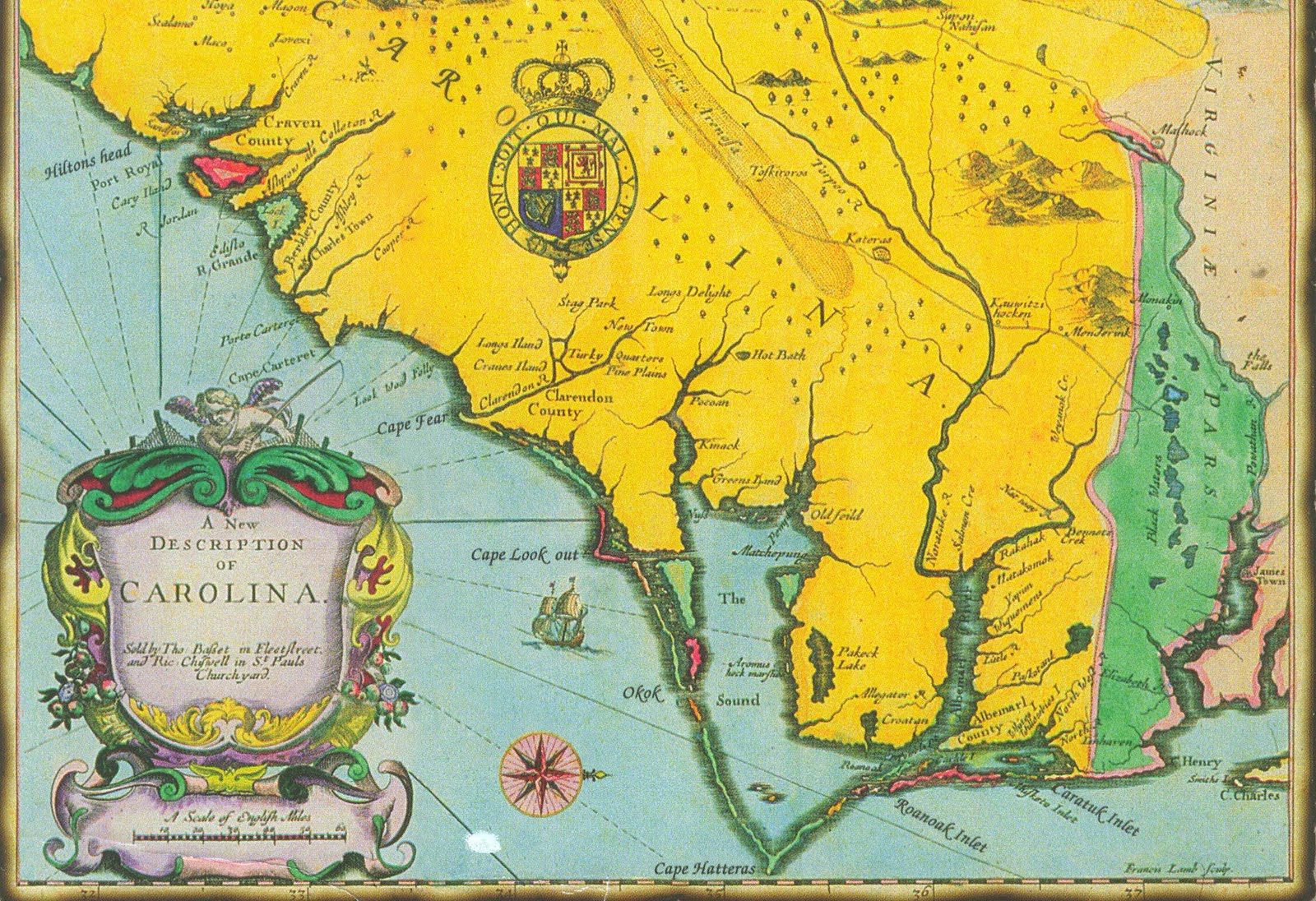
Mouth of the "Nuss" in "A New Description of Carolina", engraved by Francis Lamb (London, Tho. Basset and Richard Chiswell, 1676). Right side of map faces north.

The river has one of the three oldest surviving English-applied placenames in the U.S. Explorers named the Neuse River after the American Indian tribe known as Neusiok, with whom the early Raleigh expeditions made contact. They also identified the region as the "Neusiok". Two English captains, Arthur Barlowe and Phillip Amadas, were commissioned by Sir Walter Raleigh in 1584 to explore the New World. They landed on North Carolina's coast July 2, 1584, to begin their research. In their 1585 report to Raleigh, they wrote favorably of the Indian population in "… the country Neusiok, situated upon a goodly river called Neuse …", as it was called by the local population.

In 1865 during the American Civil War, the Confederates burned one of the last ironclad warships which they had built, the Ram Neuse, to prevent its capture by Union troops. The level of the river had fallen so that it prevented the ship from passing downriver. Nearly a century later, during another period of historically low water, the remains of the ship were discovered. It was raised in 1963. Later, the ship was installed beside the river at the Governor Caswell Memorial in Kinston.

William Larry Stewart II, a.k.a. Billy Stewart (March 24, 1937 – January 17, 1970), an American rhythm and blues singer and pianist, died in a broad-daylight car accident in January 1970, just two months prior to his 33rd birthday. The accident happened when the Ford Thunderbird that Stewart was driving approached a bridge across the Neuse River near Smithfield, North Carolina. His car left the highway, ran along the median strip at a slight angle to the highway, struck the bridge abutment, and then plunged into the river, killing Stewart and his three passengers instantly.

The low-head Quaker Neck Dam was built in 1952 at Neuse River kilometer 225 to impound cooling water for a steam electric plant. A fish ladder was included. The dam was removed in May 1998, opening up access for anadromous fish to 127 kilometres (79 mi) of the mainstem Neuse River.

== Water quality ==
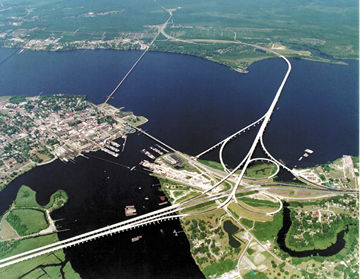
A bridge over the Neuse River at New Bern, where the Trent River (bottom) joins it

The Neuse River has experienced water-quality problems associated with wastewater discharge, stormwater runoff, and nutrient pollution. Excess nitrogen and phosphorus can contribute to eutrophication in the Neuse River Estuary, affecting algal growth and dissolved oxygen conditions. Research using long-term data from the estuary has found that river nitrogen concentrations are an important factor controlling algal levels.

Nutrient removal also occurs naturally within the Neuse River Estuary. Denitrification is a process in which microorganisms convert reactive forms of nitrogen into nitrogen gas, removing nitrogen from the aquatic system. A 2023 study of flooded habitats in the upper Neuse River Estuary found net denitrification in marshes, forested wetlands, undeveloped areas, stormwater ponds, and shallow sub-tidal sediments. Nitrogen removal varied among habitats and under different nitrate and storm conditions.

The effects of nutrient pollution and nitrogen removal can vary throughout the river and estuary. Historical research has documented long-term changes in nutrient inputs and river-borne nutrient exports, while more recent research has focused on how nutrient concentrations and environmental conditions influence algal growth and nitrogen processing.

== Tributaries ==
- Eno River
- Flat River
- Little River
- Stoney Creek
- Crabtree Creek
- Walnut Creek
- West Bear Creek
- Bear Creek
- Contentnea Creek
- Lefferts' Creek
- Trent River

== See also ==
- South Atlantic-Gulf Water Resource Region
