= Jones County, North Carolina =

County in North Carolina, United States

- County
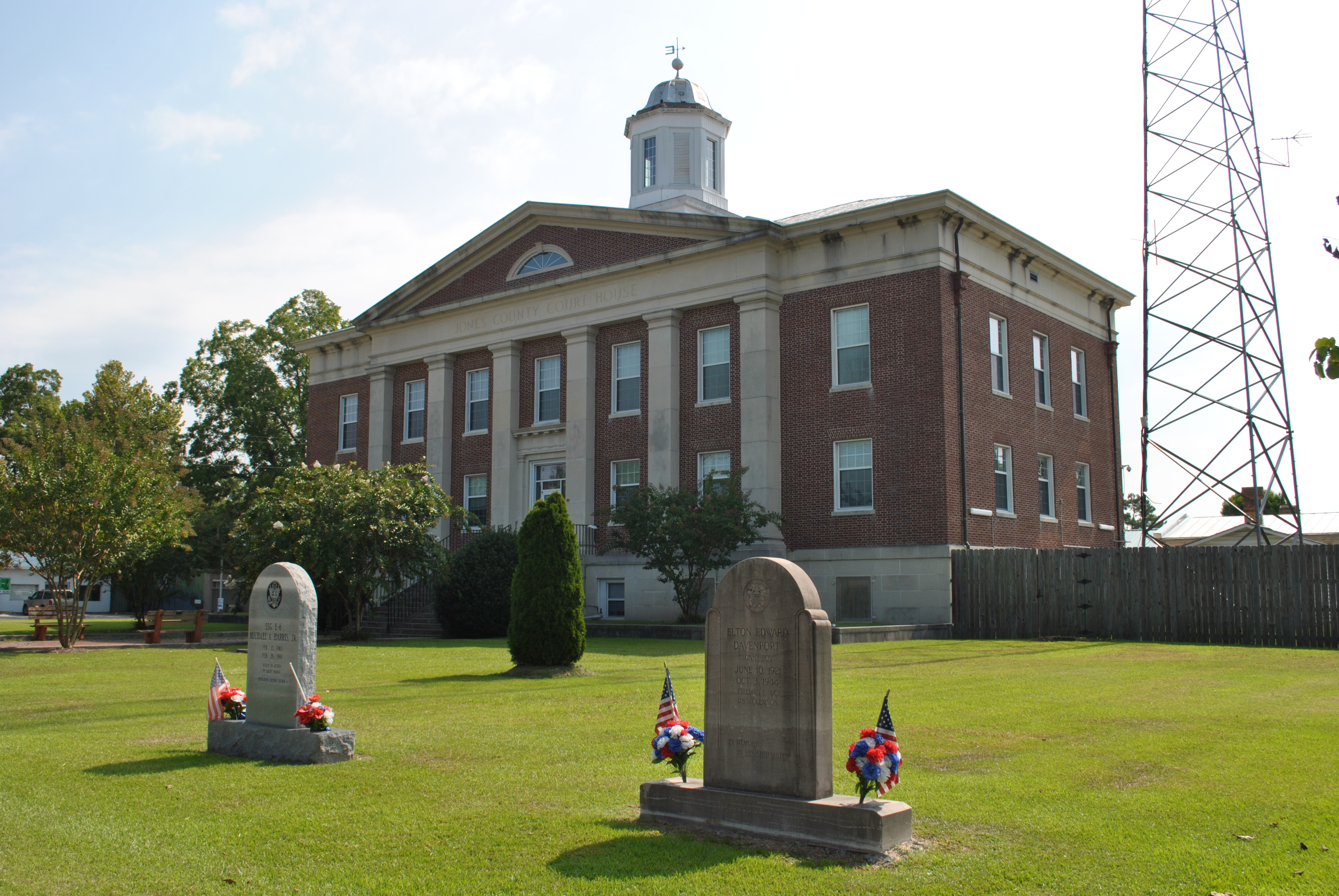
- Jones County Courthouse

- Flag Seal Logo
- Motto: "Small Living. Big Opportunity. Ready to Grow."
- Location within the U.S. state of North Carolina
- Interactive map of Jones County, North Carolina
- Coordinates: 35.03°N 77.36°W
- Country: United States
- State: North Carolina
- Founded: 1779
- Named for: Willie Jones
- Seat: Trenton
- Largest community: Maysville

Area
  - Total: 473.72 sq mi (1,226.9 km^{2})
  - Land: 471.39 sq mi (1,220.9 km^{2})
  - Water: 2.33 sq mi (6.0 km^{2}) 0.49%

Population (2020)
  - Total: 9,172
  - Estimate (2025): 9,575 ▲
  - Density: 19.59/sq mi (7.56/km^{2})
- Time zone: UTC−5 (Eastern)
  - Summer (DST): UTC−4 (EDT)
- Congressional district: 3rd
- Website: jonescountync.gov

Jones County is a county located in the U.S. state of North Carolina. As of the 2020 census, the population was 9,172, making it the fourth-least populous county in North Carolina. Its county seat is Trenton. Jones County is part of the New Bern, NC Micropolitan Statistical Area.

There are only three incorporated towns in Jones County, Pollocksville, Trenton, and Maysville. Two major highways in the county include: US 17 which runs south to Jacksonville, and north to New Bern and US 70 which runs west to Kinston, and east to Morehead City. Additionally, NC Highway 58 runs from the Lenoir/Jones county line to Trenton, where it turns south towards Pollocksville, then shares the road shortly with US 17 to Maysville, then runs south to the Jones/Carteret County line near Peletier.

== History ==
The area eventually encompassing Jones County was inhabited by Tuscarora Native Americans before the arrival of German and Swiss settlers in the early 1700s. The county was formed in 1779 from the southwestern part of Craven County. It was named for Willie Jones, a planter, slaveholder, Revolutionary leader, and president of the North Carolina Committee of Safety during the war. He opposed state ratification of the United States Constitution and did not attend the Fayetteville Convention, which voted to ratified it. In 1784, the town of Trenton was made the county seat of government.

The rural Low Country county was originally developed for plantations, which were dependent on the labor of enslaved African Americans. The county has heavily relied on agriculture (mostly tobacco) and lumber from its nearby forest.

In 2004, the county's population slightly rose above 10,000 in a census estimate but has since decreased to 9,172 in the 2020 census.

== Geography ==
According to the U.S. Census Bureau, the county has a total area of 473.72 square miles (1,226.9 km^{2}), of which 471.39 square miles (1,220.9 km^{2}) is land and 2.33 square miles (6.0 km^{2}) (0.49%) is water. The county is dominated by farmland and swamps.

=== National protected areas ===
- Catfish Lake South Wilderness (part)
- Croatan National Forest (part)
- Pond Pine Wilderness (part)

=== State and local protected areas ===
- Croatan Game Land (part)
- Hofmann Forest (part)

=== Major water bodies ===
- Beaverdam Creek
- Catfish Lake
- Trent River

=== Adjacent counties ===
- Craven County – northeast
- Carteret County – southeast
- Onslow County – south
- Duplin County – west
- Lenoir County – northwest

=== Major highways ===
- Future I-42
- US 17
- US 70
- US 258
- NC 41
- NC 58

=== Major infrastructure ===
- Marine Corps Outlying Field Oak Grove, small military base near Pollocksville

== Demographics ==
Historical population
| Census | Pop. | Note | %± |
|---|---|---|---|
| 1790 | 4,796 | | — |
| 1800 | 4,339 | | −9.5% |
| 1810 | 4,968 | | 14.5% |
| 1820 | 5,216 | | 5.0% |
| 1830 | 5,608 | | 7.5% |
| 1840 | 4,945 | | −11.8% |
| 1850 | 5,038 | | 1.9% |
| 1860 | 5,730 | | 13.7% |
| 1870 | 5,002 | | −12.7% |
| 1880 | 7,491 | | 49.8% |
| 1890 | 7,403 | | −1.2% |
| 1900 | 8,226 | | 11.1% |
| 1910 | 8,721 | | 6.0% |
| 1920 | 9,912 | | 13.7% |
| 1930 | 10,428 | | 5.2% |
| 1940 | 10,926 | | 4.8% |
| 1950 | 11,004 | | 0.7% |
| 1960 | 11,005 | | 0.0% |
| 1970 | 9,779 | | −11.1% |
| 1980 | 9,705 | | −0.8% |
| 1990 | 9,414 | | −3.0% |
| 2000 | 10,381 | | 10.3% |
| 2010 | 10,153 | | −2.2% |
| 2020 | 9,172 | | −9.7% |
| 2025 (est.) | 9,575 | ▲ | 4.4% |
U.S. Decennial Census; 1790–1960 1900–1990; 1990–2000 2010 2020

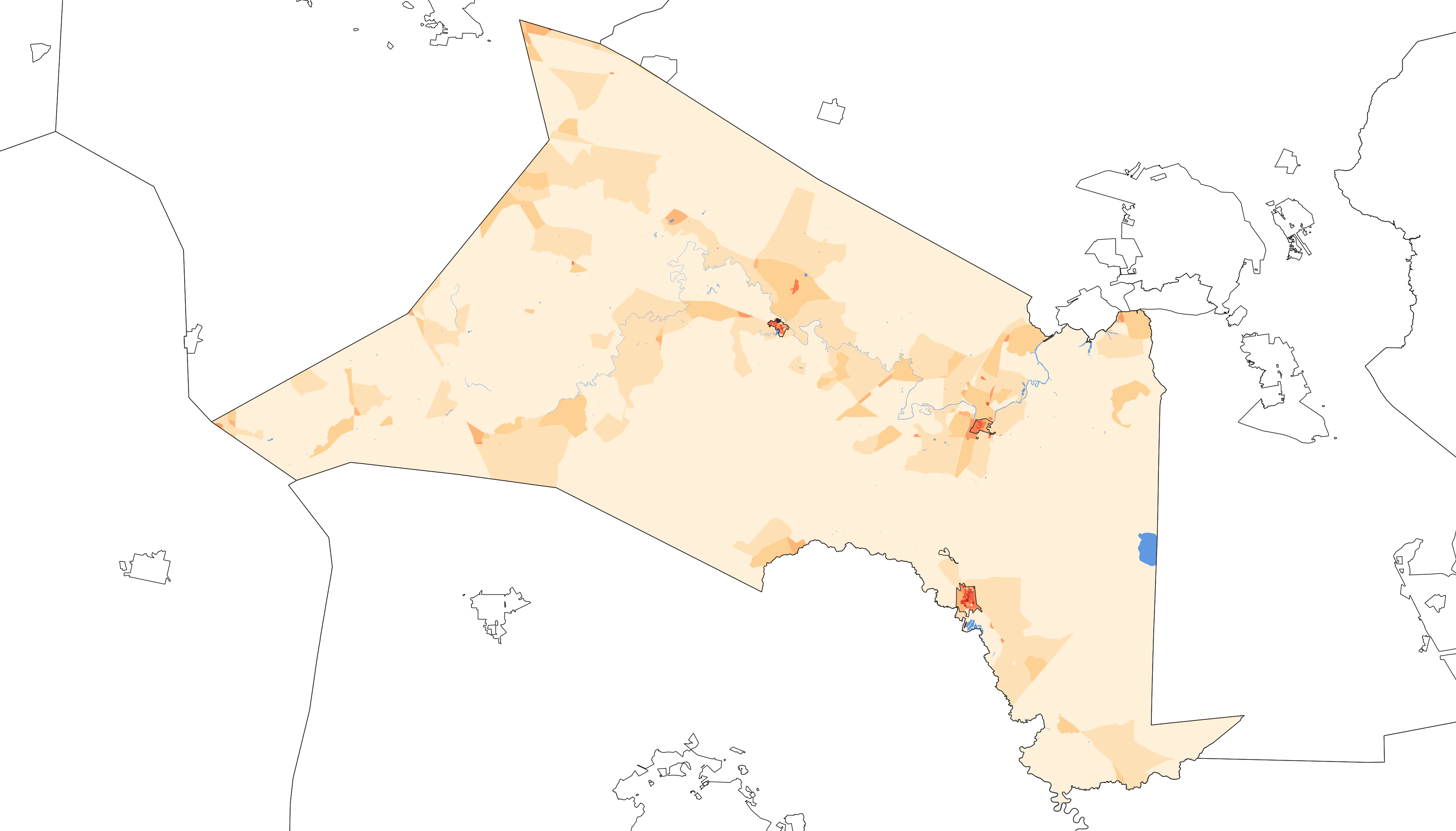
2020 population density of Jones County NC by census block

=== Racial and ethnic composition ===
Jones County, North Carolina – Racial and ethnic composition Note: the US Census treats Hispanic/Latino as an ethnic category. This table excludes Latinos from the racial categories and assigns them to a separate category. Hispanics/Latinos may be of any race.
| Race / Ethnicity (NH = Non-Hispanic) | Pop 1980 | Pop 1990 | Pop 2000 | Pop 2010 | Pop 2020 | % 1980 | % 1990 | % 2000 | % 2010 | % 2020 |
|---|---|---|---|---|---|---|---|---|---|---|
| White alone (NH) | 5,424 | 5,665 | 6,256 | 6,217 | 5,787 | 55.89% | 60.18% | 60.26% | 61.23% | 63.09% |
| Black or African American alone (NH) | 4,179 | 3,670 | 3,703 | 3,276 | 2,564 | 43.06% | 38.98% | 35.67% | 32.27% | 27.95% |
| Native American or Alaska Native alone (NH) | 20 | 8 | 32 | 51 | 42 | 0.21% | 0.08% | 0.31% | 0.50% | 0.46% |
| Asian alone (NH) | 3 | 18 | 16 | 32 | 32 | 0.03% | 0.19% | 0.15% | 0.32% | 0.35% |
| Native Hawaiian or Pacific Islander alone (NH) | x | x | 4 | 2 | 0 | x | x | 0.04% | 0.02% | 0.00% |
| Other race alone (NH) | 0 | 0 | 11 | 12 | 35 | 0.00% | 0.00% | 0.11% | 0.12% | 0.38% |
| Mixed race or Multiracial (NH) | x | x | 77 | 165 | 318 | x | x | 0.74% | 1.63% | 3.47% |
| Hispanic or Latino (any race) | 79 | 53 | 282 | 398 | 394 | 0.81% | 0.56% | 2.72% | 3.92% | 4.30% |
| Total | 9,705 | 9,414 | 10,381 | 10,153 | 9,172 | 100.00% | 100.00% | 100.00% | 100.00% | 100.00% |

=== 2020 census ===
As of the 2020 census, there were 9,172 people, 3,873 households, and 2,644 families residing in the county. There were 4,635 housing units recorded, 16.4% of which were vacant, while 77.6% of occupied units were owner-occupied and 22.4% renter-occupied, with homeowner and rental vacancy rates of 1.3% and 6.3%, respectively.

The median age was 48.9 years; 18.4% of residents were under the age of 18 and 24.3% were 65 years of age or older. For every 100 females there were 92.7 males, and for every 100 females age 18 and over there were 90.2 males age 18 and over.

The racial makeup of the county was 64.0% White, 28.1% Black or African American, 0.7% American Indian and Alaska Native, 0.4% Asian, 0.1% Native Hawaiian and Pacific Islander, 2.3% from some other race, and 4.6% from two or more races, with Hispanic or Latino residents of any race comprising 4.3% of the population.

Less than 0.1% of residents lived in urban areas, while 100.0% lived in rural areas.

=== 2000 census ===
At the 2000 census, there were 10,381 people, 4,061 households, and 2,936 families residing in the county. The population density was 22 people per square mile (8.5 people/km^{2}). There were 4,679 housing units at an average density of 10 units per square mile (3.9 units/km^{2}). The racial makeup of the county was 60.97% White, 35.87% Black or African American, 0.36% Native American, 0.15% Asian, 0.04% Pacific Islander, 1.70% from other races, and 0.92% from two or more races. 2.72% of the population were Hispanic or Latino of any race.

There were 4,061 households, out of which 31.70% had children under the age of 18 living with them, 52.20% were married couples living together, 15.20% had a female householder with no husband present, and 27.70% were non-families. 24.50% of all households were made up of individuals, and 11.40% had someone living alone who was 65 years of age or older. The average household size was 2.53 and the average family size was 2.99.

In the county, the population was spread out, with 25.70% under the age of 18, 6.80% from 18 to 24, 26.90% from 25 to 44, 25.20% from 45 to 64, and 15.40% who were 65 years of age or older. The median age was 39 years. For every 100 females there were 93.00 males. For every 100 females age 18 and over, there were 89.90 males.

The median income for a household in the county was $30,882, and the median income for a family was $35,180. Males had a median income of $28,662 versus $19,536 for females. The per capita income for the county was $15,916. About 14.20% of families and 16.90% of the population were below the poverty line, including 22.30% of those under age 18 and 16.70% of those age 65 or over.

== Law, government and politics ==
Jones County is a member of the regional Eastern Carolina Council of Governments. The Jones County Government relies entirely upon an all volunteer (non-paid) fire department force segregated by geographic location(s). The Law Enforcement structure consists of one paid Pollocksville Police Chief, one paid Maysville Police Chief, and an elected Sheriff with a small (less than 25 person force) to handle law enforcement, detention, and emergency communications. The county government relies heavily on volunteer deputization. Emergency ambulance services consist of one full-time medical unit dispatched from the town of Trenton and relies heavily on other volunteer EMS personnel geographically scattered around the county to assist with a medical emergency. Additional EMS transportation vehicles are subsidized by EMS services provided by adjacent counties or private enterprises. There is no animal control unit. The County Detention Facility is a 21-bed (3 female) facility located in the basement of the county courthouse and the detention staff double up as the communications/911 emergency communications staff.

United States presidential election results for Jones County, North Carolina
| Year | Republican | | Democratic | | Third party(ies) | |
| Year | No. | % | No. | % | No. | % |
|---|---|---|---|---|---|---|
| 1912 | 35 | 4.40% | 635 | 79.87% | 125 | 15.72% |
| 1916 | 233 | 24.66% | 712 | 75.34% | 0 | 0.00% |
| 1920 | 385 | 28.54% | 964 | 71.46% | 0 | 0.00% |
| 1924 | 179 | 20.50% | 692 | 79.27% | 2 | 0.23% |
| 1928 | 658 | 57.52% | 486 | 42.48% | 0 | 0.00% |
| 1932 | 132 | 8.33% | 1,449 | 91.42% | 4 | 0.25% |
| 1936 | 188 | 10.74% | 1,563 | 89.26% | 0 | 0.00% |
| 1940 | 233 | 14.53% | 1,371 | 85.47% | 0 | 0.00% |
| 1944 | 211 | 14.73% | 1,221 | 85.27% | 0 | 0.00% |
| 1948 | 113 | 8.04% | 1,238 | 88.05% | 55 | 3.91% |
| 1952 | 331 | 16.52% | 1,673 | 83.48% | 0 | 0.00% |
| 1956 | 415 | 17.53% | 1,952 | 82.47% | 0 | 0.00% |
| 1960 | 585 | 23.35% | 1,920 | 76.65% | 0 | 0.00% |
| 1964 | 776 | 26.71% | 2,129 | 73.29% | 0 | 0.00% |
| 1968 | 361 | 10.72% | 1,225 | 36.39% | 1,780 | 52.88% |
| 1972 | 1,650 | 58.93% | 1,093 | 39.04% | 57 | 2.04% |
| 1976 | 948 | 31.48% | 2,016 | 66.95% | 47 | 1.56% |
| 1980 | 1,401 | 38.60% | 2,198 | 60.55% | 31 | 0.85% |
| 1984 | 2,062 | 50.30% | 2,025 | 49.40% | 12 | 0.29% |
| 1988 | 1,649 | 45.78% | 1,946 | 54.03% | 7 | 0.19% |
| 1992 | 1,438 | 37.39% | 1,962 | 51.01% | 446 | 11.60% |
| 1996 | 1,682 | 45.28% | 1,829 | 49.23% | 204 | 5.49% |
| 2000 | 2,114 | 53.33% | 1,822 | 45.96% | 28 | 0.71% |
| 2004 | 2,607 | 57.77% | 1,893 | 41.95% | 13 | 0.29% |
| 2008 | 2,817 | 53.89% | 2,378 | 45.49% | 32 | 0.61% |
| 2012 | 2,837 | 54.24% | 2,352 | 44.97% | 41 | 0.78% |
| 2016 | 2,974 | 57.92% | 2,065 | 40.21% | 96 | 1.87% |
| 2020 | 3,280 | 59.37% | 2,197 | 39.76% | 48 | 0.87% |
| 2024 | 3,409 | 62.40% | 2,007 | 36.74% | 47 | 0.86% |

== Recreation ==
Jones County lies 8 miles (13 km) west of the Atlantic Ocean but the only waterfront areas in the county are along the Trent and White Oak rivers. Part of the Great Dover Swamp also lies within the county lines. Many enjoy boating and fishing activities as well as camping at the 17 Family Campground along Highway 17 north in Maysville. The Croatan National Forest offers hiking trails and wildlife viewing and the wide open spaces of fields and forests are a haven for outdoor enthusiasts.

== Communities ==
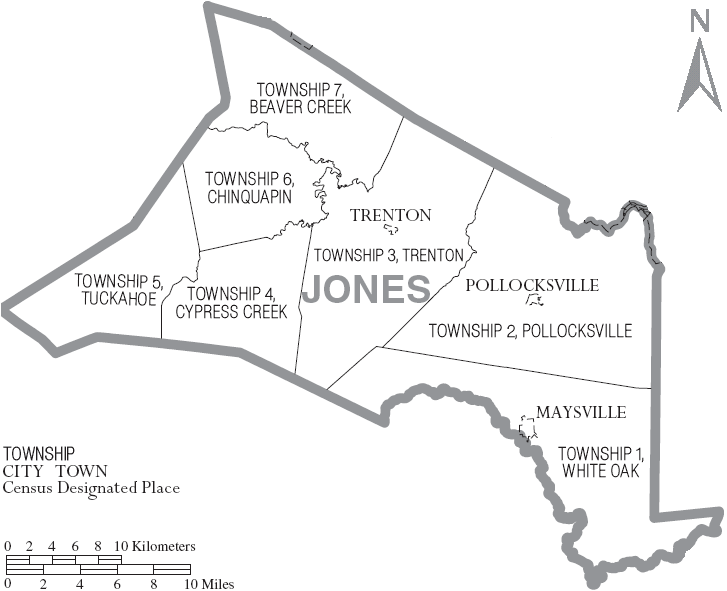
Map of Jones County with municipal and township labels

=== Towns ===
- Maysville (largest community; also in Onslow County)
- Pollocksville
- Trenton (county seat)

=== Unincorporated communities ===
- Comfort
- Oak Grove

=== Townships ===
The county is divided into seven townships, which are both numbered and named:

- Township 1, White Oak
- Township 2, Pollocksville
- Township 3, Trenton
- Township 4, Cypress Creek
- Township 5, Tuckahoe
- Township 6, Chinquapin
- Township 7, Beaver Creek

== See also ==
- List of counties in North Carolina
- National Register of Historic Places listings in Jones County, North Carolina
- Marine Corps Base Camp Lejeune, major military base in Onslow County

== Works cited ==
- Bryan, Sarah; Patterson, Beverly; Lanier, Michelle (2013). African American Music Trails of Eastern North Carolina. Chapel Hill: University of North Carolina Press. ISBN 9781469612799.
