= Falls, North Carolina =

- Unincorporated community
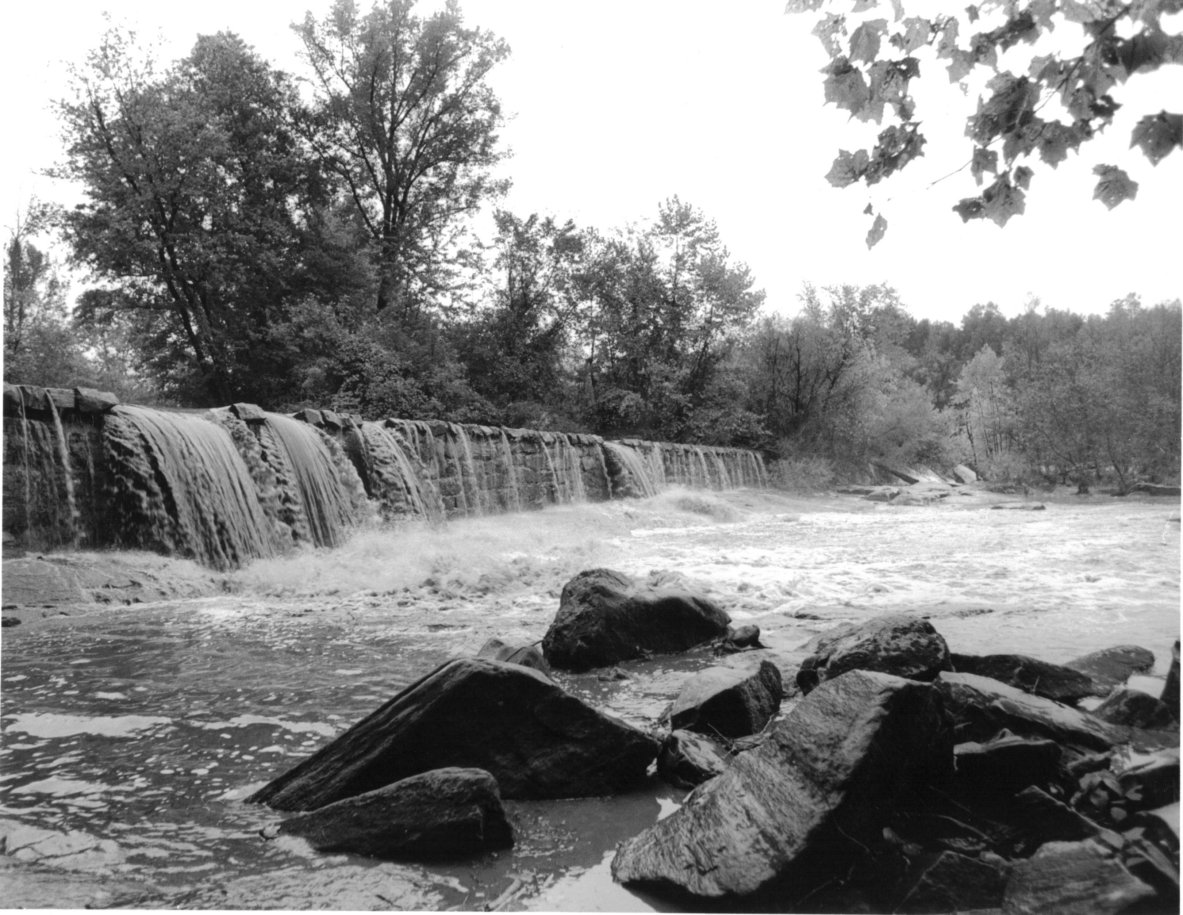
- Stone dam on Neuse River at Falls, North Carolina prior to the construction of the current Falls Lake Dam

- Location within the state of North Carolina
- Coordinates: 35°56′24″N 78°34′46″W
- Country: United States
- State: North Carolina
- County: Wake
- Elevation: 200 ft (61 m)
- Time zone: UTC-5 (Eastern (EST))
  - Summer (DST): UTC-4 (EDT)
- ZIP code(s): 27587, 27614,
- Area code: 919
- GNIS feature ID: 1020212

Falls (aka Falls of Neuse; Falls of the Neuse), is an unincorporated community in Wake County, North Carolina, United States, situated on Old Falls of Neuse Road, between Raleigh and Wake Forest, near the Wakefield Plantation development. Falls Dam, on the Neuse River, is within the community.

== History ==
=== First mention of school ===
A "Lancaster" School was opened at the Falls of Neuse by Governor David Stone in 1814. James Boyle, trained at Georgetown, D.C., was in charge of the school for two years.

=== First mention of mills ===
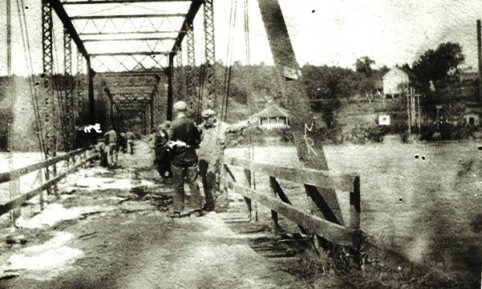
Historic Neuse River Bridge at Falls, North Carolina

On Nov. 24th, 1846, the owner of certain property, Jas. D. Newsom, at the Falls (described as being 13 miles north of Raleigh on the Raleigh-Oxford Road) placed 113 acres for sale containing a grist mill, a saw mill, a tan yard, and store houses. In an article entitled “Great Falls of Neuse River: Important to Capitalists” and published in The Raleigh Register (Raleigh, North Carolina) on Friday, December 25, 1846, Mr. Newsom notes “The water power at this place is immense, embracing from head to foot a fall of upwards of thirty feet, and sufficient to run any amount of machinery that might be desired”. Mr. Newson also mentions “I have owned this property ever since 1835, since which time these mills never have been stopped by either high or low water.” In the same article he lists three other tracts of land for sale: one adjacent to the above land and containing 250 acres and a dwelling house, and two other nearby tracts of land containing almost 1000 acres in total. He indicates that the area around this property is a major cotton growing region. Mr. Newson also mentions the land is within 4 miles of two railroad depots, one at Forestville and one at Huntsville.

This land and the mill were likely previously owned by Burwell Perry. A notice was published by Wesley Jones, Trustee, in The Weekly Standard (Raleigh, North Carolina) on January 29, 1840, advertising the sale of "that valuable plantation belonging to the said Perry, lying in the county of Wake on the Neuse River, containing, about two thousand acres, on which is an excellent Saw and Grist Mill."

=== Paper and cotton mill community ===
The community was founded in the 1850s, with the construction of a paper mill on the Neuse River at the site. It was named for the now-submerged Falls of the Neuse, which were the reason for building the mill. The community grew around the intersection of Falls of Neuse Rd (SR 2000), Fonville Rd (SR 2001), and Possum Track Rd. (SR 2002). At its peak, the community contained three churches, a volunteer fire department, a one-room school house, a ball field, and an ice house.

The community began its decline after the mill shut down in 1959. In 1981, Falls Dam was completed, flooding Possum Track Rd and dividing the community in half.

The Falls of the Neuse Manufacturing Company was listed on the National Register of Historic Places in 1983. It has since been converted into an apartment complex.

== Community ==
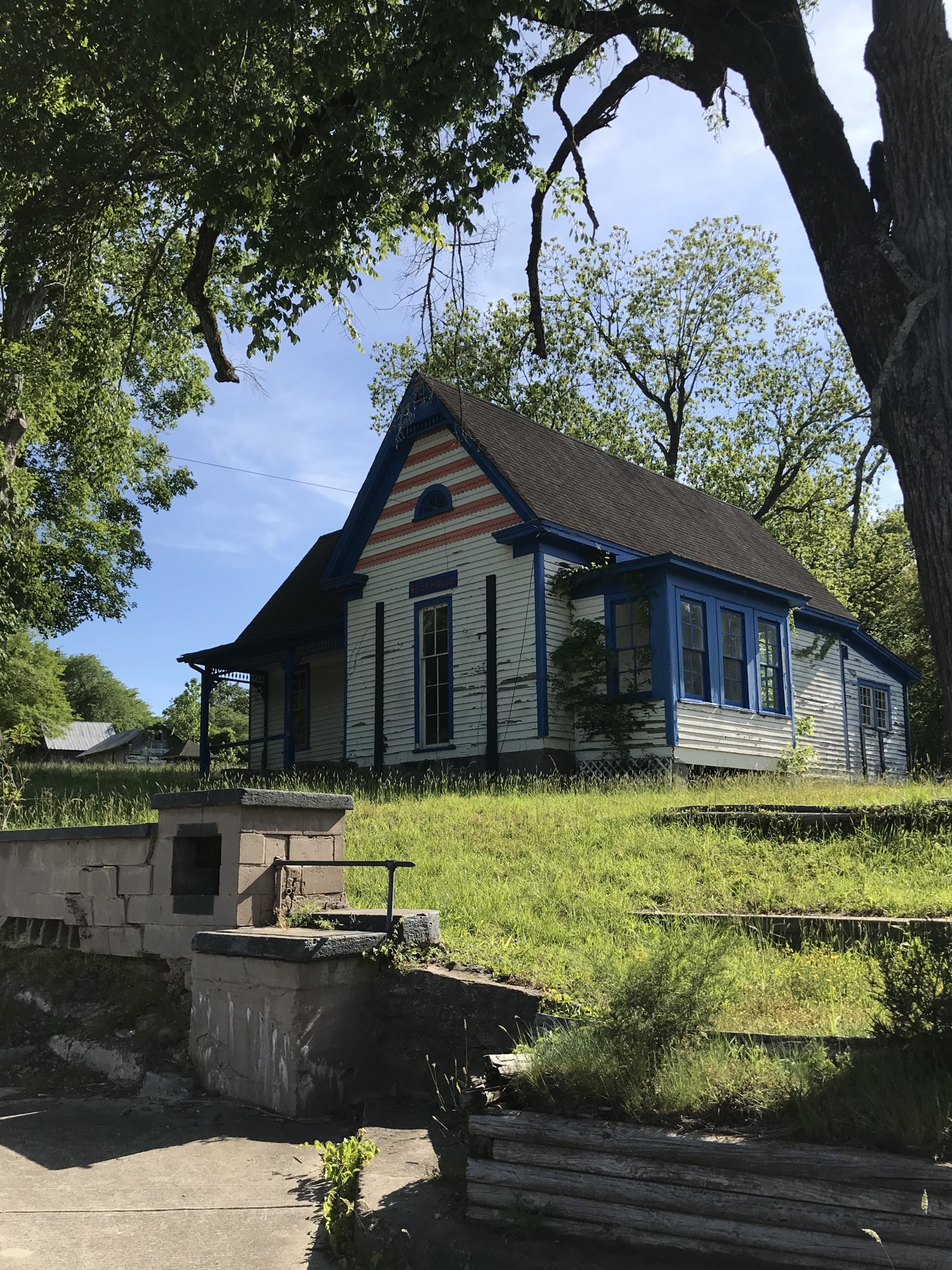
Boat house in Falls, 2020

Falls borders the Wakefield Plantation and Bedford developments in Raleigh. It is at the corner of four townships: New Light, Bartons Creek, Neuse, and Wake Forest. Local subdivisions include The Falls, River Run, Woodbridge, Oakcroft, and Falls Pointe.

Falls Lake Dam is in the community, as well as the beginning to the Neuse River Greenway. Religious organizations include Falls Baptist Church, Falls Of Neuse Pentecostal Holiness Church, and Falls of Neuse Church of God. Wakefield High School is located just outside the community.
