= Neuse =

Neuse may refer to following, all in North Carolina:

- Neuse, North Carolina
- Neuse people, an Indigenous tribe that went extinct in the 18th century
- Neuse River
- Neuse Township, Wake County, North Carolina
- Neuse Correctional Institute
- Neuse Forest, North Carolina
- Cliffs of the Neuse State Park

or to the Confederate States Navy ship:

- CSS Neuse
