= New Light, North Carolina =

New Light
- Unincorporated community
- Location in North Carolina Location in the United States
- Coordinates: 36°00′45″N 78°35′50″W
- Country: United States
- State: North Carolina
- County: Wake
- Township: New Light
- Established: 1775

New Light is an unincorporated community in New Light Township, Wake County, North Carolina, United States. It is located at the intersection of Purnell Rd (SR 1909), Stony Hill Rd (SR 1917), and Mangum Dairy Rd (SR 1911). It has an elevation of 413 ft. As of January 2019, New Light Township has a population of 8,687 and a median home value of $380,000.

== History ==
In the 1750s, New Light Baptists migrated from New England to North Carolina. They established the first Baptist church in Wake County in 1771. The community later had a creek and a township named after them.
