= Bayleaf, North Carolina =

Bayleaf
- Unincorporated community
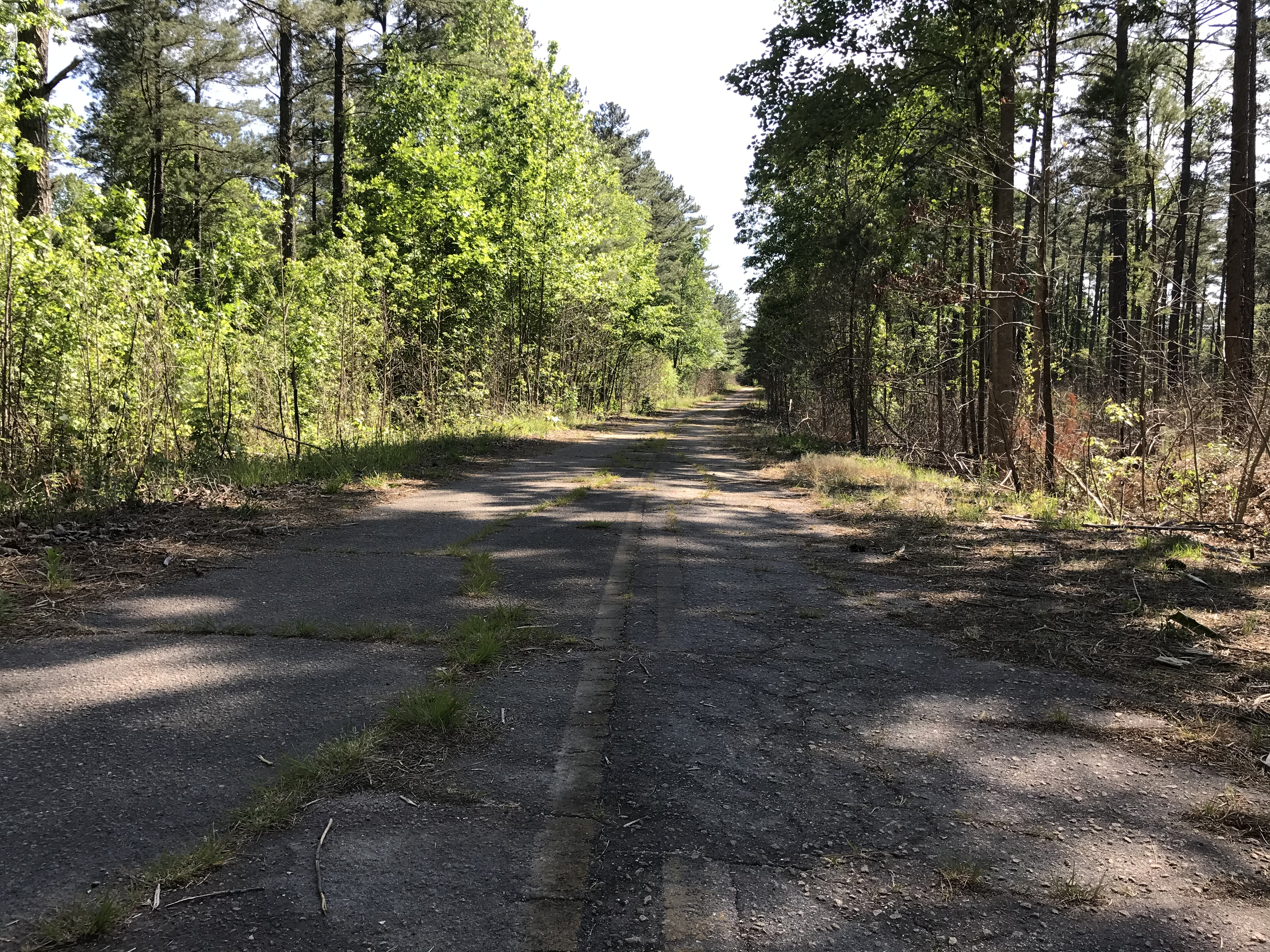
- Old Bayleaf Road

- Location in North Carolina Location in United States
- Coordinates: 35°56′39″N 78°38′34″W
- Country: United States
- State: North Carolina
- County: Wake
- Township: Bartons Creek
- Elevation: 427 ft (130 m)
- Time zone: UTC-5 (Eastern Time)
  - Summer (DST): UTC-4 (Eastern Daylight Time)

Bayleaf, historically also spelled Bay Leaf, is an unincorporated community in Bartons Creek Township, Wake County, North Carolina, North Carolina, United States. Centered on the intersection of Six Forks Road, Norwood Road, Bayleaf Church Road, Honeycutt Road, and Possum Track Road, the community developed around a one-room schoolhouse established during the late nineteenth century. Bay Leaf Baptist Church, founded in 1880, became one of the area's earliest institutions. Bayleaf has an elevation of 427 feet (130 m).

The community includes Bay Leaf Baptist Church, St. Luke the Evangelist Catholic Church, and Northern Wake Fire Station 1, formerly Bay Leaf Fire Station 1.

== History ==
=== Origin of the name ===
The origin of the community's name is traditionally traced to the construction of a one-room schoolhouse during the late 1870s. According to the history maintained by Bay Leaf Baptist Church, local residents selected the name Bay Leaf because it resembled the surname Bailey, which was common among families in the area. The same account states that the name may also have referred to bay trees growing around a nearby spring that supplied water to the school. Historically, both Bay Leaf and Bayleaf have appeared in maps, road names, businesses, and government records. Modern official sources, including the U.S. Geological Survey's Geographic Names Information System, use the single-word form Bayleaf, while several local institutions, including Bay Leaf Baptist Church and the former Bay Leaf Volunteer Fire Department, continue to use the two-word spelling.

=== Early community ===
The one-room schoolhouse became an early focal point for the surrounding rural community. Bay Leaf Missionary Baptist Church was organized in 1880 with J. R. Maynard serving as its first pastor. Construction of the church building was completed in 1889, establishing one of the community's earliest permanent institutions. During the twentieth century, Bayleaf remained a rural crossroads community centered on the intersection of Six Forks Road, Norwood Road, Bayleaf Church Road, Honeycutt Road, and Possum Track Road.

== Geography ==
Bayleaf is located in northern Wake County within Bartons Creek Township. The historic center of the community is situated at the intersection of Six Forks Road (SR 1005), Norwood Road (SR 1834), Bayleaf Church Road (SR 2003), Honeycutt Road (SR 2005), and Possum Track Road (SR 2002). The community lies north of Raleigh and south of the Falls Lake recreation area.

== Community landmarks ==
Several longstanding institutions have served as focal points for the Bayleaf community since the late nineteenth century.

=== Bay Leaf Baptist Church ===
Bay Leaf Baptist Church was organized in 1880. The congregation initially met near the community's one-room schoolhouse before completing its first permanent church building in 1889. The church has remained one of the community's principal institutions since its founding.

=== Historic crossroads ===
The historic center of Bayleaf is located at the intersection of Six Forks Road, Norwood Road, Bayleaf Church Road, Honeycutt Road, and Possum Track Road. The crossroads has historically served as the center of the surrounding community.

=== Community institutions ===
Modern community institutions include Bay Leaf Baptist Church, St. Luke the Evangelist Catholic Church, and a fire station serving the Bayleaf area.
