= Township 10 =

Township 10 may refer to:

- Marks Creek Township, Wake County, North Carolina
- Township 10, Benton County, Arkansas
- Township 10, Rooks County, Kansas
