= Feltonville =

Feltonville can refer to any of several places in the United States:

- Feltonville, Massachusetts - the former name of Hudson, Massachusetts
- Feltonville, North Carolina
- Feltonville, Philadelphia, Pennsylvania - a neighborhood of Philadelphia, Pennsylvania
