= Falls of the Neuse Manufacturing Company =

- U.S. National Register of Historic Places
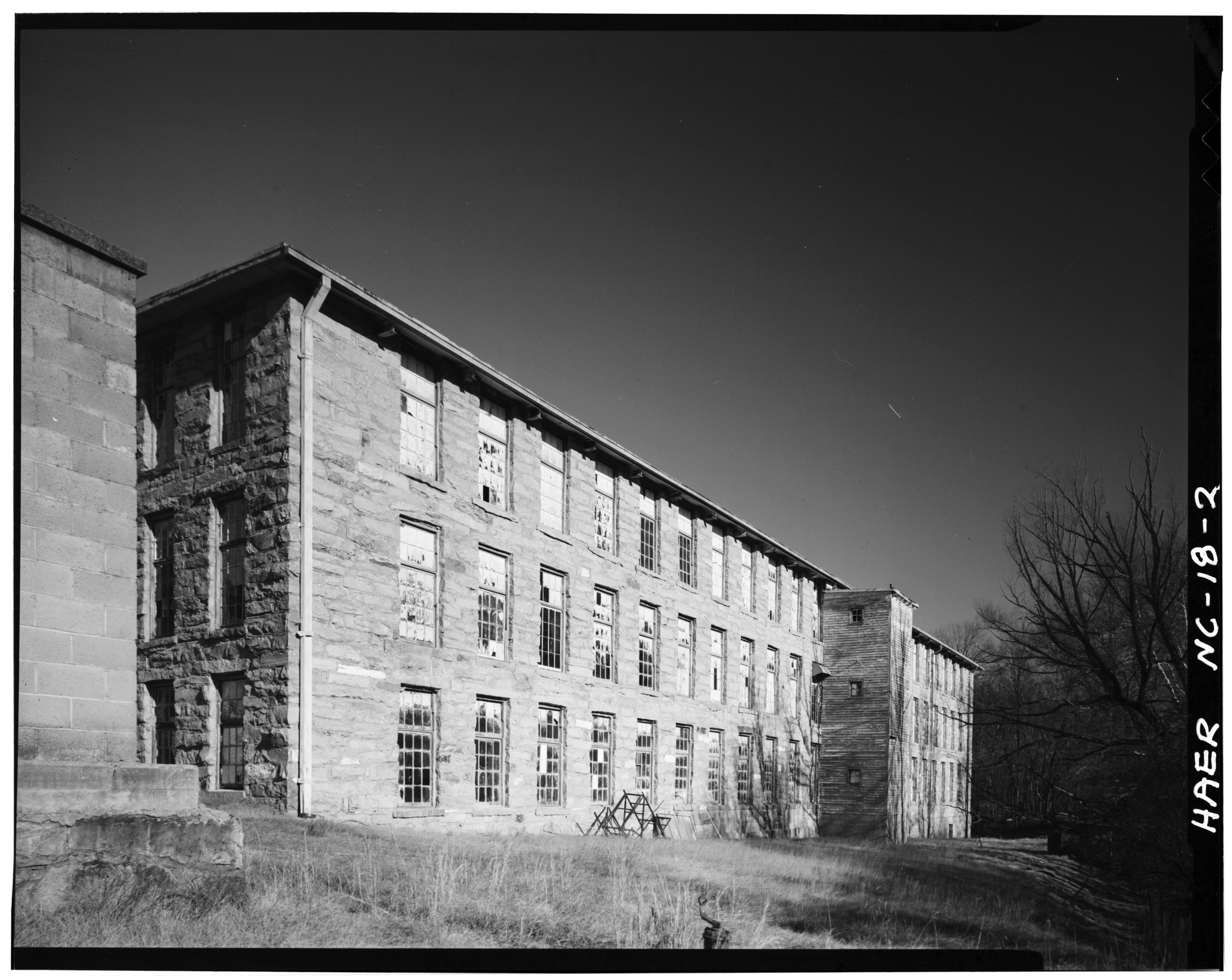

- Location within North Carolina Location within the United States
- Location: Neuse River at SR 2000, Falls, North Carolina
- Coordinates: 35°56′20″N 78°34′44″W
- Area: 4 acres (1.6 ha)
- Built: 1854-1855
- NRHP reference No.: 83001921
- Added to NRHP: September 19, 1983

Falls of the Neuse Manufacturing Company, also known as the Manteo Manufacturing Company and Forest Manufacturing Company, is a historic paper mill complex located at Falls, Wake County, North Carolina. The main mill building was built from 1854–1855, and is a three-story, quarried granite block building measuring 195 feet long and 54 feet wide. Located on the property is the stone mill dam, measuring about 400 feet wide and roughly 6 feet tall, and the one-story picker room, measuring 53 feet square. The mill operated as a paper mill until 1896, and later housed a cotton mill and warehouse.

It was listed on the National Register of Historic Places in 1983.
