= Wake County, North Carolina =

County in North Carolina, United States

- County
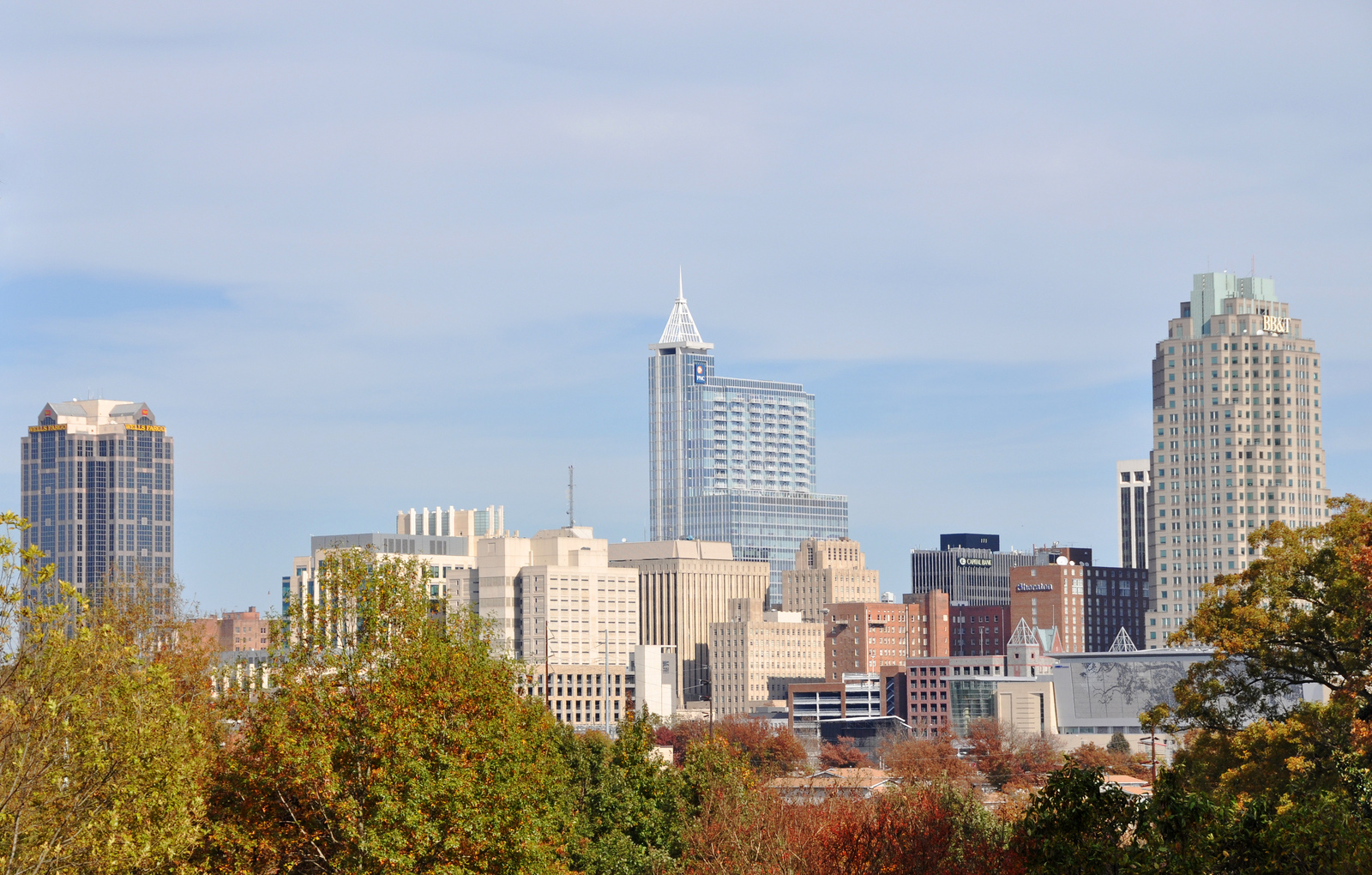
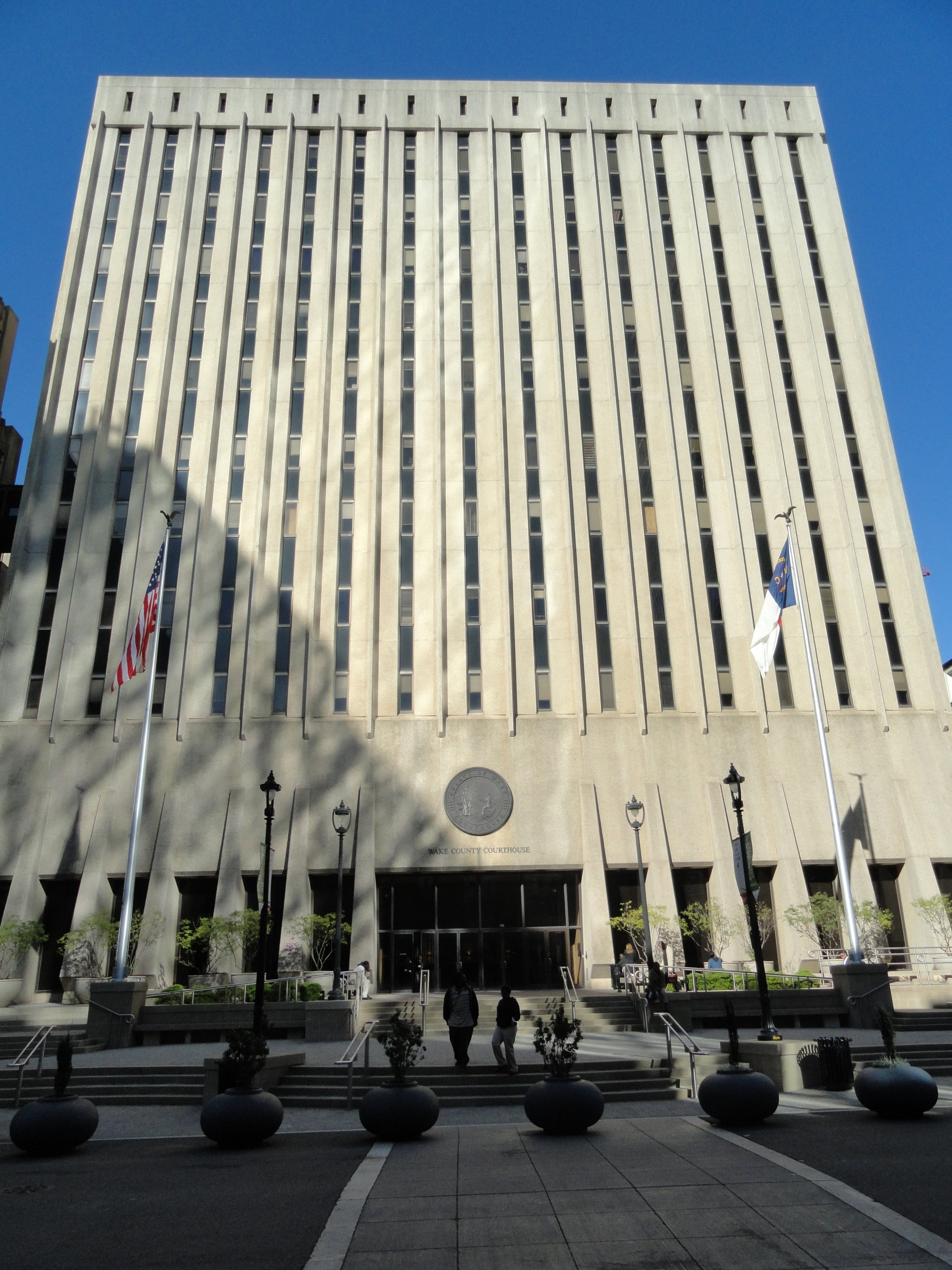
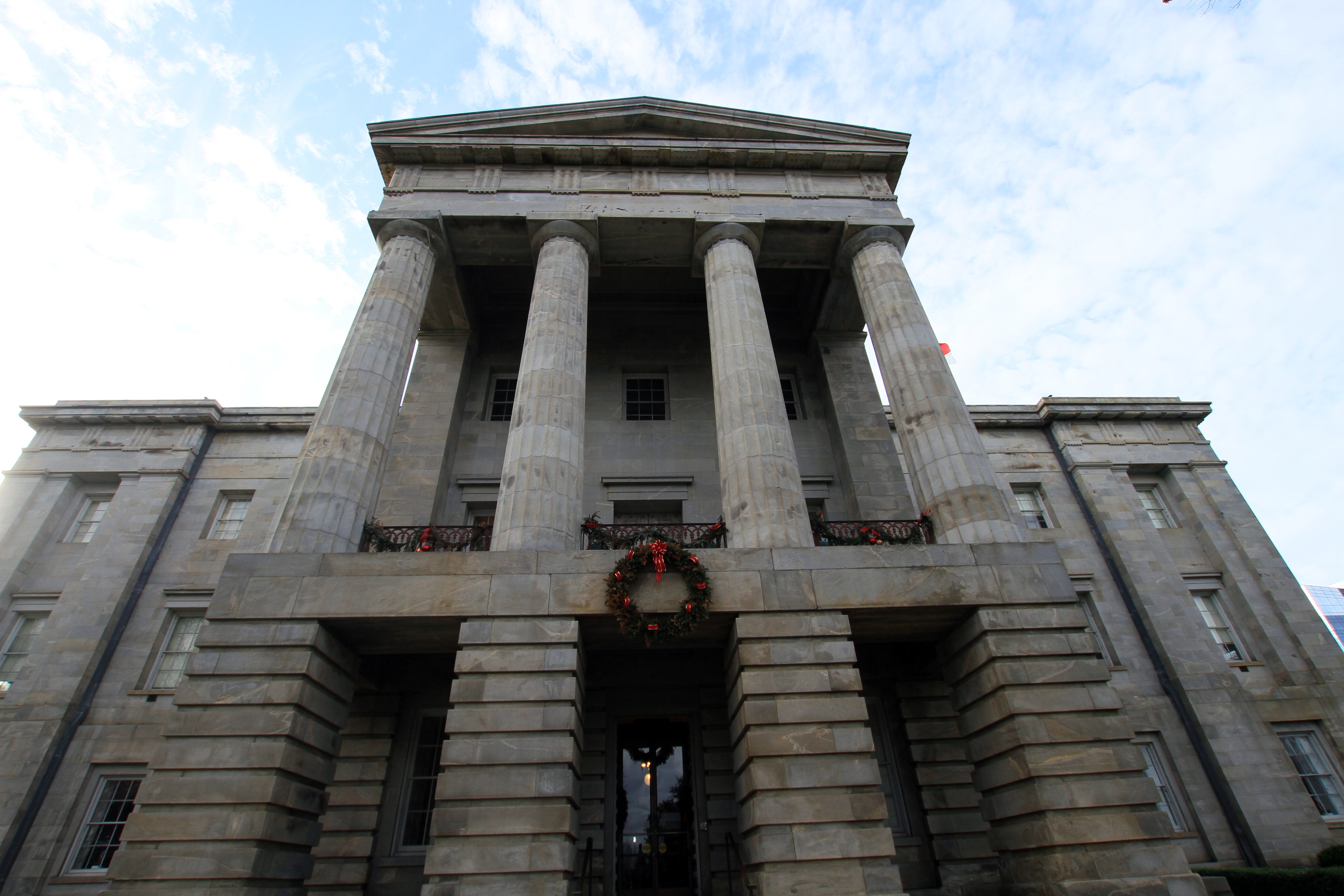
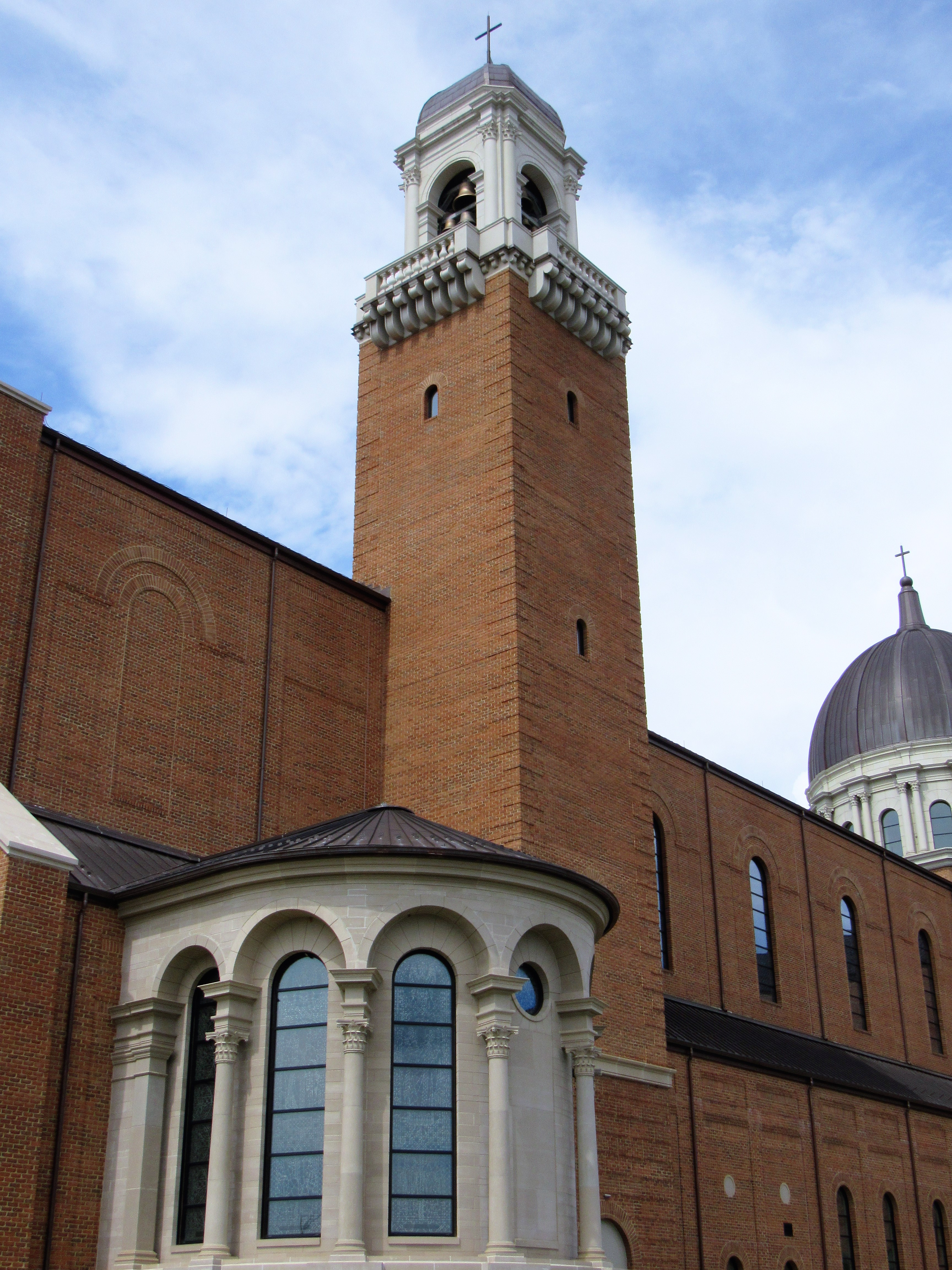
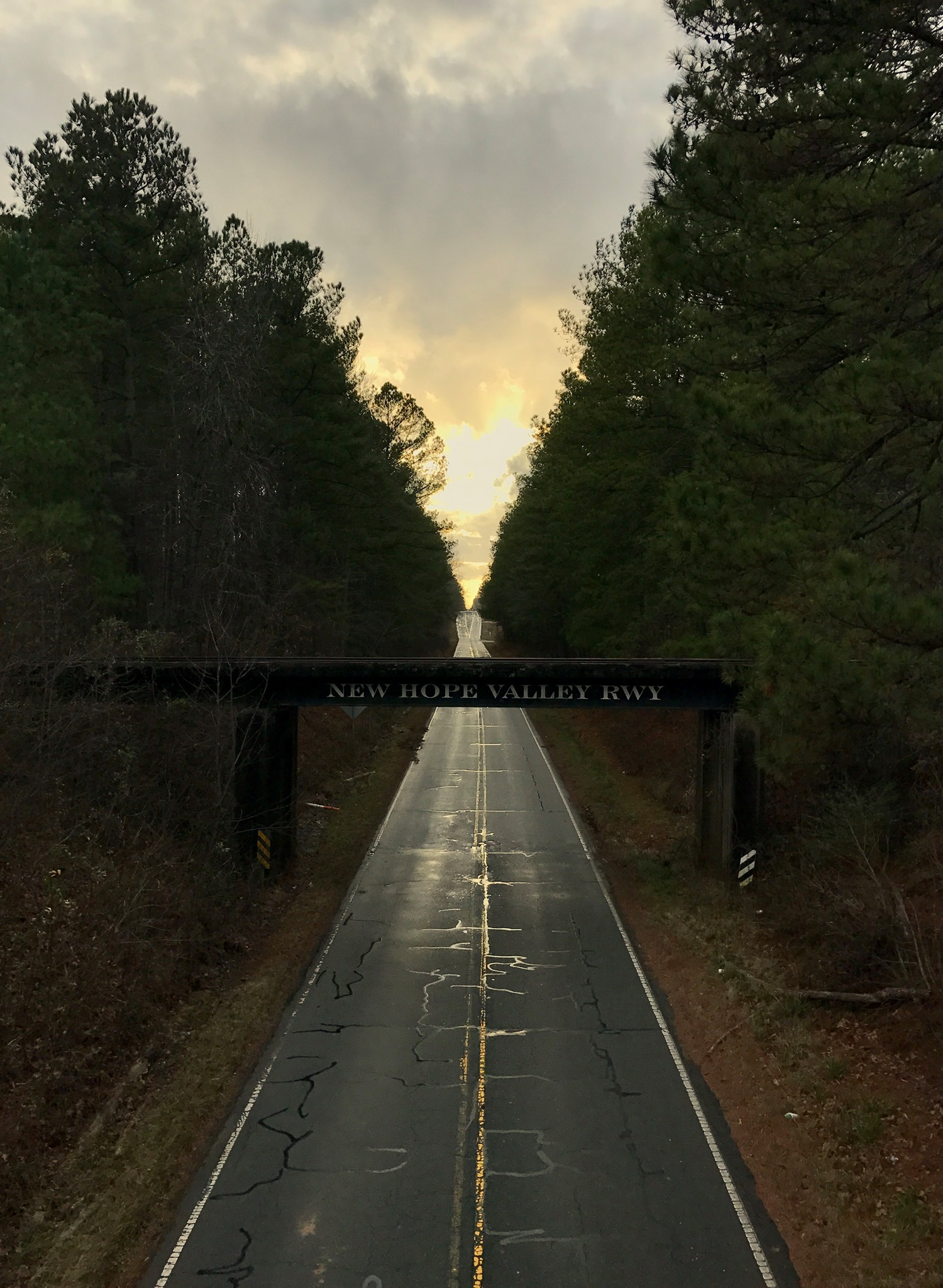
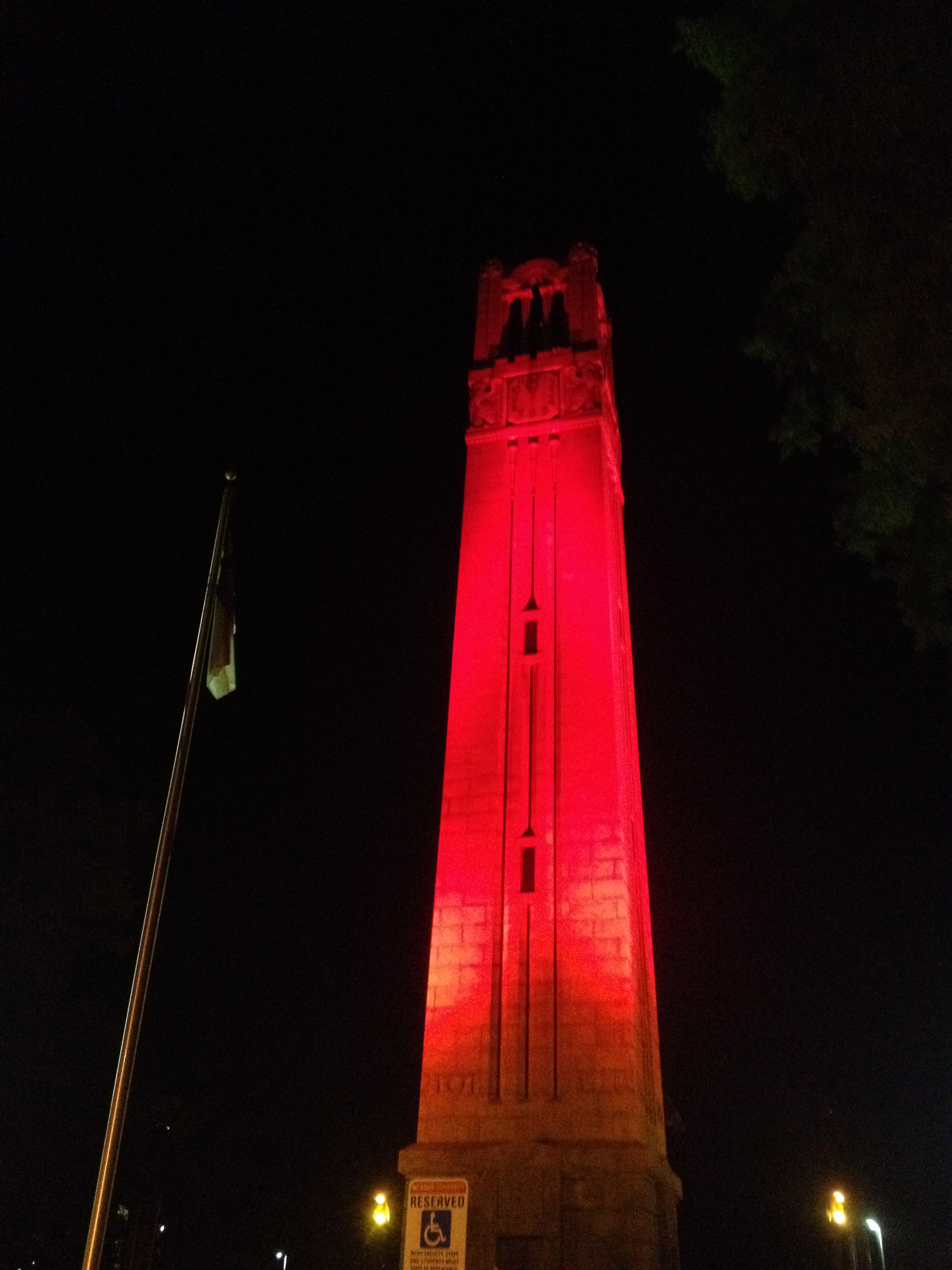
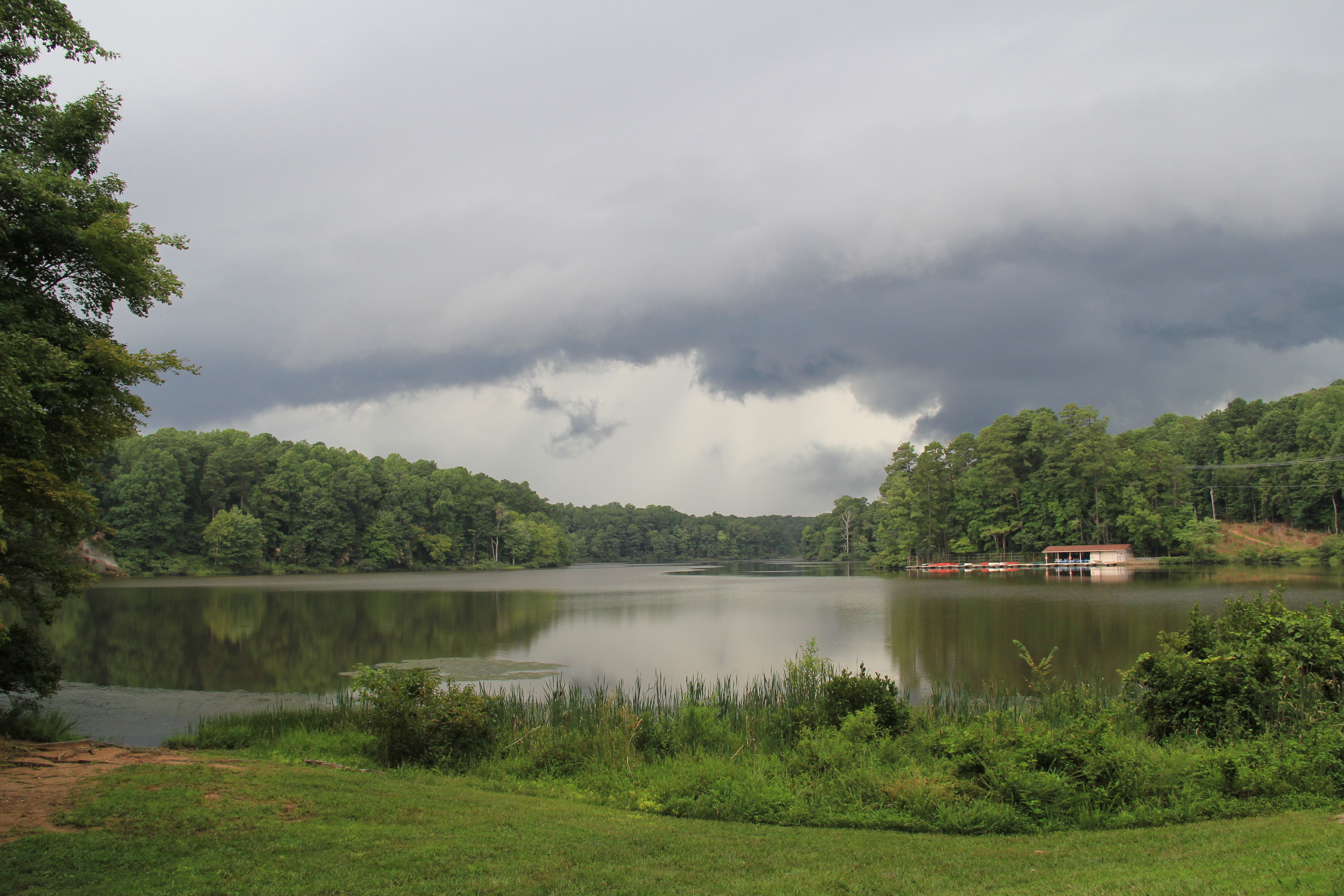
- Raleigh skyline Wake County Courthouse North Carolina State Capitol Holy Name of Jesus Cathedral New Hope Valley Railway NCSU Memorial Belltower William B. Umstead State Park

- Flag Seal Logo

- Location within the U.S. state of North Carolina
- Coordinates: 35.79°N 78.65°W
- Country: United States
- State: North Carolina
- Founded: 1771
- Named for: Margaret Wake
- Seat: Raleigh
- Largest community: Raleigh

Area
  - Total: 857.02 sq mi (2,219.7 km^{2})
  - Land: 834.59 sq mi (2,161.6 km^{2})
  - Water: 22.43 sq mi (58.1 km^{2}) 2.62%

Population (2020)
  - Total: 1,129,410
  - Estimate (2025): 1,257,235 ▲
  - Density: 1,353.3/sq mi (522.49/km^{2})

GDP
  - Total: $128.428 billion (2024)
- Time zone: UTC−5 (Eastern)
  - Summer (DST): UTC−4 (EDT)
- Congressional districts: 2nd, 4th, 13th
- Website: www.wake.gov

Wake County is a county in the U.S. state of North Carolina. As of the 2020 census, its population was 1,129,410, making it the most populous county in North Carolina. The county seat is Raleigh, which is also the state capital.

Besides Raleigh, eleven other municipalities are in Wake County, the largest of which is the town of Cary, the third-most populous city of the Research Triangle region and the seventh-most populous municipality in North Carolina.

It is governed by the Wake County Board of Commissioners, coterminous with the Wake County Public School System, with law enforcement provided by the Wake County Sheriff's Department. It is also part of the wider Central Pines Regional Council, which governs regional planning.

From July 2005 to July 2006, Wake County was the 9th-fastest growing county in the United States, with Cary and Raleigh being the 8th- and 15th-fastest growing communities, respectively.

== History ==
=== Early history ===
Prior to English colonization, present-day Wake County was part of the Tuscarora nation.

=== 18th century ===
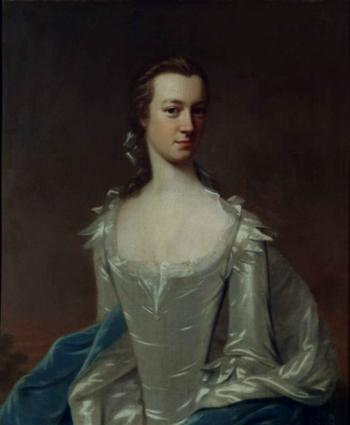
Margaret Wake Tryon

Wake County was formed in 1771 from parts of Cumberland County, Johnston County, and Orange County. The first courthouse was built at a village originally called Wake Courthouse, now known as Bloomsbury. In 1771, the first elections and court were held, and the first militia units were organized.

Wake County lost some of its territory through the formation of other counties. Parts were included in Franklin County in 1787, and in Durham County in both 1881 and 1911.

During the colonial period of North Carolina, the state capital was New Bern. For several years during and after the Revolutionary War, there was no capital, and the General Assembly met in various locations. Fayetteville was the state capital in 1786, 1789, 1790, and 1793, when Raleigh became the permanent state capital in 1794. In 1792, a commission was appointed to select a site to build a permanent state capital. The commission members favored land owned by Colonel John Hinton across the Neuse River, but the night before the final vote, the committee adjourned to the home of Joel Lane for an evening of food and spirits. The next day, the vote went in Lane's favor.

Lane named Wake County in honor of Margaret Wake Tryon, wife of colonial Governor William Tryon. Raleigh was named after Sir Walter Raleigh, and established in 1792 on 1,000 acres (4.0 km^{2}) purchased from Lane. Raleigh had never set foot in North Carolina, but he had sponsored the establishment of the first English colony in North America on North Carolina's Roanoke Island in 1585. The city of Raleigh became both the state capital and the new seat of Wake County.

=== 19th century ===
The Battle at Morrisville Station was fought April 13–15, 1865, in Morrisville, North Carolina, during the Carolinas Campaign of the American Civil War. It was the last official battle of the Civil War between the armies of Major General William T. Sherman and General Joseph E. Johnston. General Judson Kilpatrick, commanding officer of the Union cavalry advance, compelled Confederate forces under the command of Generals Wade Hampton III and Joseph Wheeler to withdraw in haste. They had been frantically trying to transport their remaining supplies and wounded by rail westward toward the final Confederate encampment in Greensboro. Kilpatrick used artillery on the heights overlooking Morrisville Station and cavalry charges to push the Confederates out of the small village, leaving many needed supplies behind. However, the trains were able to withdraw with wounded from the Battle of Bentonville and the Battle of Averasboro. Later, General Johnston sent a courier to the federal encampments at Morrisville with a message for Major General Sherman requesting a conference to discuss an armistice. Several days later, the two generals met at Bennett Place near Durham on April 17, 1865, to begin discussing the terms of what would become the largest surrender of the war.

=== 20th century ===
In the 20th century, the average per capita income for the county was of $54,988, and the median income for a family was of $67,149. In the same period, the per capita income decreased from $44,472 to $31,579, especially for women. About 7.80% of the population was below the federal poverty line.

A county courthouse was built in 1915. Space for county government in the building grew increasingly inadequate in the 1960s, and another courthouse was built in 1970.

=== 21st century ===
In August 2014, the county population surpassed 1,000,000 people.

In November 2017, the commissioners of Wake and Harnett counties discussed the possibility of redrawing the line between the counties using the latest technology. This boundary change would affect about 130 properties, with 27 having houses on them, meaning they would end up in a different county or divided between two. An agreement was reached regarding the adjustment of the Wake, Chatham, and Harnett county lines in May 2018.

== Geography ==
Interactive map of Wake County

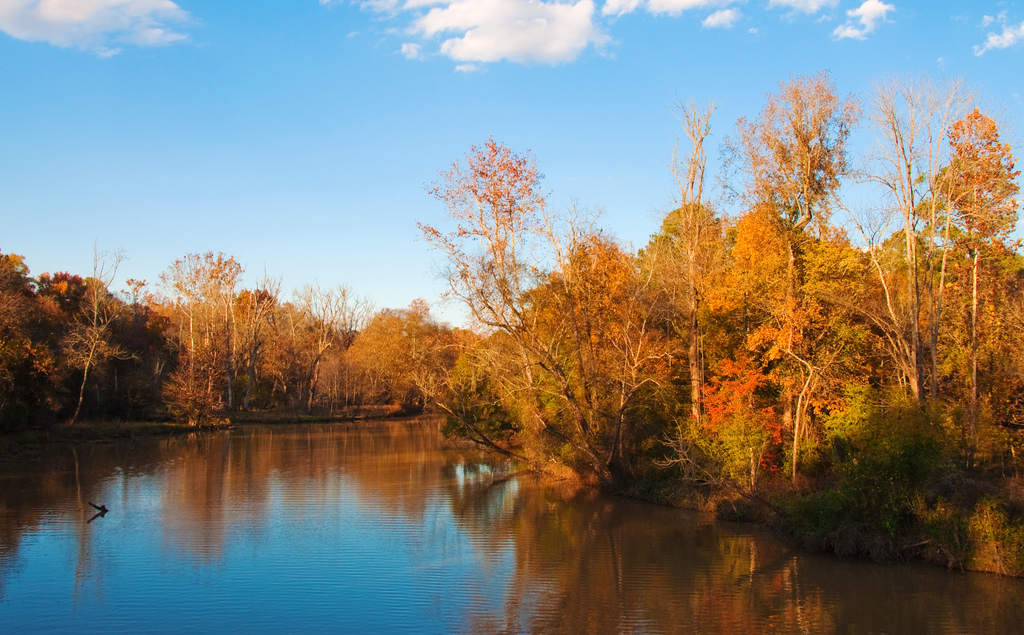
Neuse River

According to the U.S. Census Bureau, the county has a total area of 857.02 square miles (2,219.7 km^{2}), of which 834.59 square miles (2,161.6 km^{2}) is land and 22.43 square miles (58.1 km^{2}) (2.62%) is water.

Wake County is located in the northeast central region of North Carolina, where the North American Piedmont and Atlantic Coastal Plain regions meet. This area is known as the "fall line" because it marks the elevation inland at which waterfalls begin to appear in creeks and rivers. As a result, most of Wake County features gently rolling hills that slope eastward toward the state's flat coastal plain. Its central Piedmont location situates the county about three hours west of Atlantic Beach by car and four hours east of the Great Smoky Mountains.

Bodies of water that are located in Wake County include Crabtree Creek, Walnut Creek, the Neuse River, Lake Crabtree, Lake Johnson, Lake Raleigh, Lake Wheeler, Lake Benson, Harris Lake and portions of Falls Lake and Jordan Lake.

=== Climate ===
Wake County enjoys a moderate subtropical climate, with moderate temperatures in the spring, fall, and winter. Summers are typically hot with high humidity. Winter highs generally range in the low 50s °F (10 to 13 °C) with lows in the low to-mid 30s °F (−2 to 2 °C), although an occasional 60 °F (16 °C) or warmer winter day is not uncommon. Spring and fall days usually reach the low to mid-70s °F (low 20s °C), with lows at night in the lower 50s °F (10 to 14 °C). Summer daytime highs often reach the upper 80s to low 90s °F (29 to 35 °C). The rainiest months are July and August.

The county, at the National Weather Service in Raleigh, receives on average 7 inches (180 mm) of snow in the winter. Freezing rain and sleet occur most winters, and occasionally the area experiences a major damaging ice storm.

=== State and local protected areas/sites ===
- Annie Louise Wilkerson, MD Nature Preserve Park
- Blue Jay Point County Park
- Butner-Falls of Neuse Game Land (part)
- Carl Alwin Schenck Memorial Forest
- Carroll Howard Johnson Environmental Park
- Clemmons Educational State Forest (part)
- Falls Lake State Recreation Area (part)
- Forest Ridge Park
- Harris Lake County Park
- Harris Game Land (part)
- Hemlock Bluffs Nature Preserve
- Hilltop Needmore Town Park & Preserve
- JC Raulston Arboretum
- Jordan Game Land (part)
- Lake Crabtree County Park
- Mitchell Mill State Natural Area
- North Carolina Executive Mansion, historic site
- North Carolina Museum of History
- North Carolina State Capitol, historic site
- Prairie Ridge Ecostation
- Robertson Millpond Preserve
- Sandy Pines Preserve
- Turnipseed Nature Preserve
- William B. Umstead State Park

=== Major water bodies ===
- B. Everett Jordan Lake
- Beaver Dam Lake
- Brier Creek Reservoir
- Crabtree Creek
- House Creek
- Lake Benson
- Lake Betz
- Lake Crabtree
- Lake Johnson
- Lake Wheeler
- Little River
- Neuse River
- Shearon Harris Reservoir
- Stirrup Iron Creek

=== Adjacent counties ===
- Granville County – north
- Franklin County – northeast
- Nash County – east
- Johnston County – southeast
- Harnett County – southwest
- Chatham County – west
- Durham County – northwest

== Parks and recreation ==
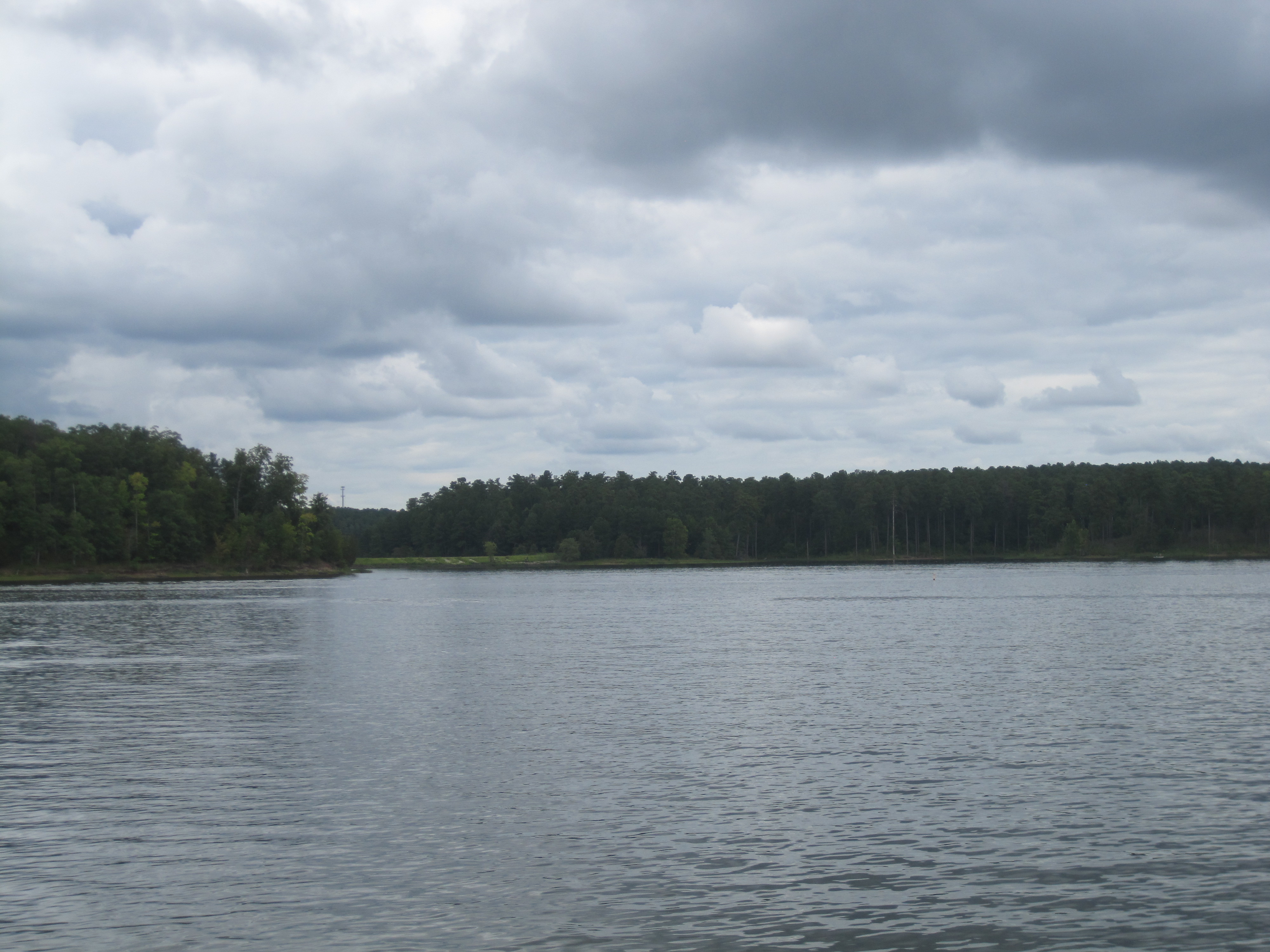
Falls Lake State Recreation Area

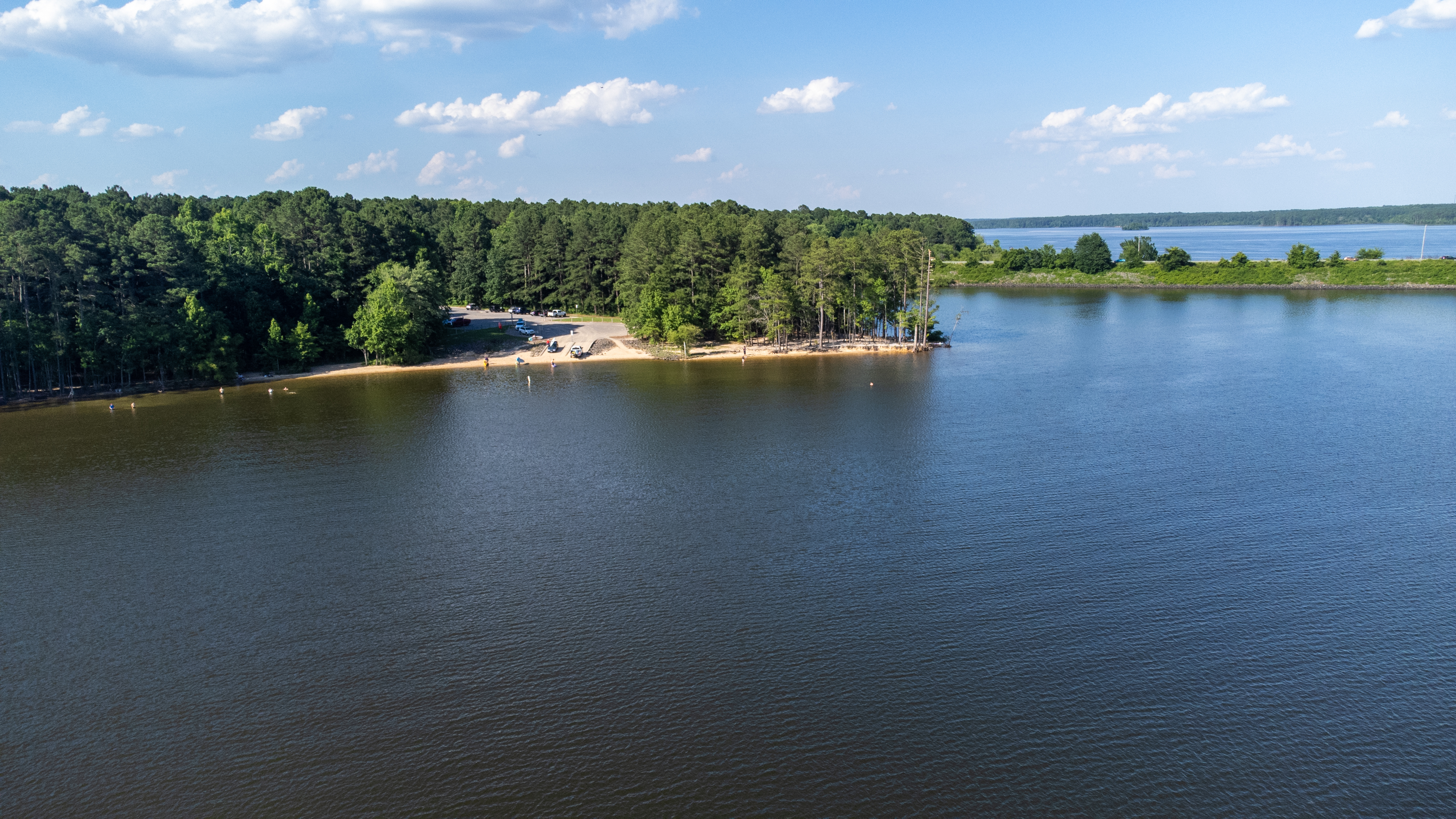
Jordan Lake State Recreation Area

=== State parks ===
Wake County is home to three state parks: Falls Lake State Recreation Area, Jordan Lake State Recreation Area, and William B. Umstead State Park. Falls Lake Park is located in northern Wake County and contains the 12,000-acre (49 km^{2}) Falls Lake and 26,000 acres (110 km^{2}) of woodlands. Umstead Park is situated between Raleigh and Cary near RDU. Located right off I-40, it is divided into two sections, Crabtree Creek and Reedy Creek, and contains 5,579 acres (22.58 km^{2}) of woodlands. Jordan Lake Park, which is partially located in Wake County near Apex, contains 13,940-acre (56.4 km^{2}) Jordan Lake and 46,768 acres (189.26 km^{2}) of woodlands. This park is known for being home to bald eagles.

=== County parks and recreation centers ===
There are 152 county parks, city parks, public swimming and public tennis facilities in Wake County. In addition, there are 53 community centers. Notable parks include Pullen Park and Yates Mill Park. The American Tobacco Trail is a 22-mile (35 km) rail trail project that is located in the Research Triangle Park region. Fifteen miles of the trail is located in Wake County and is open to pedestrians, cyclists, equestrians (in non-urban sections), and other non-motorized users. The Capital Area Greenway system has over 100 miles (160 km) of paved walking and biking trails and connects to other systems operated by municipalities and neighboring counties.

== Demographics ==
Historical population
| Census | Pop. | Note | %± |
|---|---|---|---|
| 1790 | 10,192 | | — |
| 1800 | 13,437 | | 31.8% |
| 1810 | 17,096 | | 27.2% |
| 1820 | 20,102 | | 17.6% |
| 1830 | 20,398 | | 1.5% |
| 1840 | 21,118 | | 3.5% |
| 1850 | 24,888 | | 17.9% |
| 1860 | 28,627 | | 15.0% |
| 1870 | 35,617 | | 24.4% |
| 1880 | 47,939 | | 34.6% |
| 1890 | 49,207 | | 2.6% |
| 1900 | 54,626 | | 11.0% |
| 1910 | 63,229 | | 15.7% |
| 1920 | 75,155 | | 18.9% |
| 1930 | 94,757 | | 26.1% |
| 1940 | 109,544 | | 15.6% |
| 1950 | 136,450 | | 24.6% |
| 1960 | 169,082 | | 23.9% |
| 1970 | 228,453 | | 35.1% |
| 1980 | 301,327 | | 31.9% |
| 1990 | 423,380 | | 40.5% |
| 2000 | 627,846 | | 48.3% |
| 2010 | 900,993 | | 43.5% |
| 2020 | 1,129,410 | | 25.4% |
| 2025 (est.) | 1,257,235 | ▲ | 11.3% |
U.S. Decennial Census; 1790–1960 1900–1990; 1990–2000 2010–2020

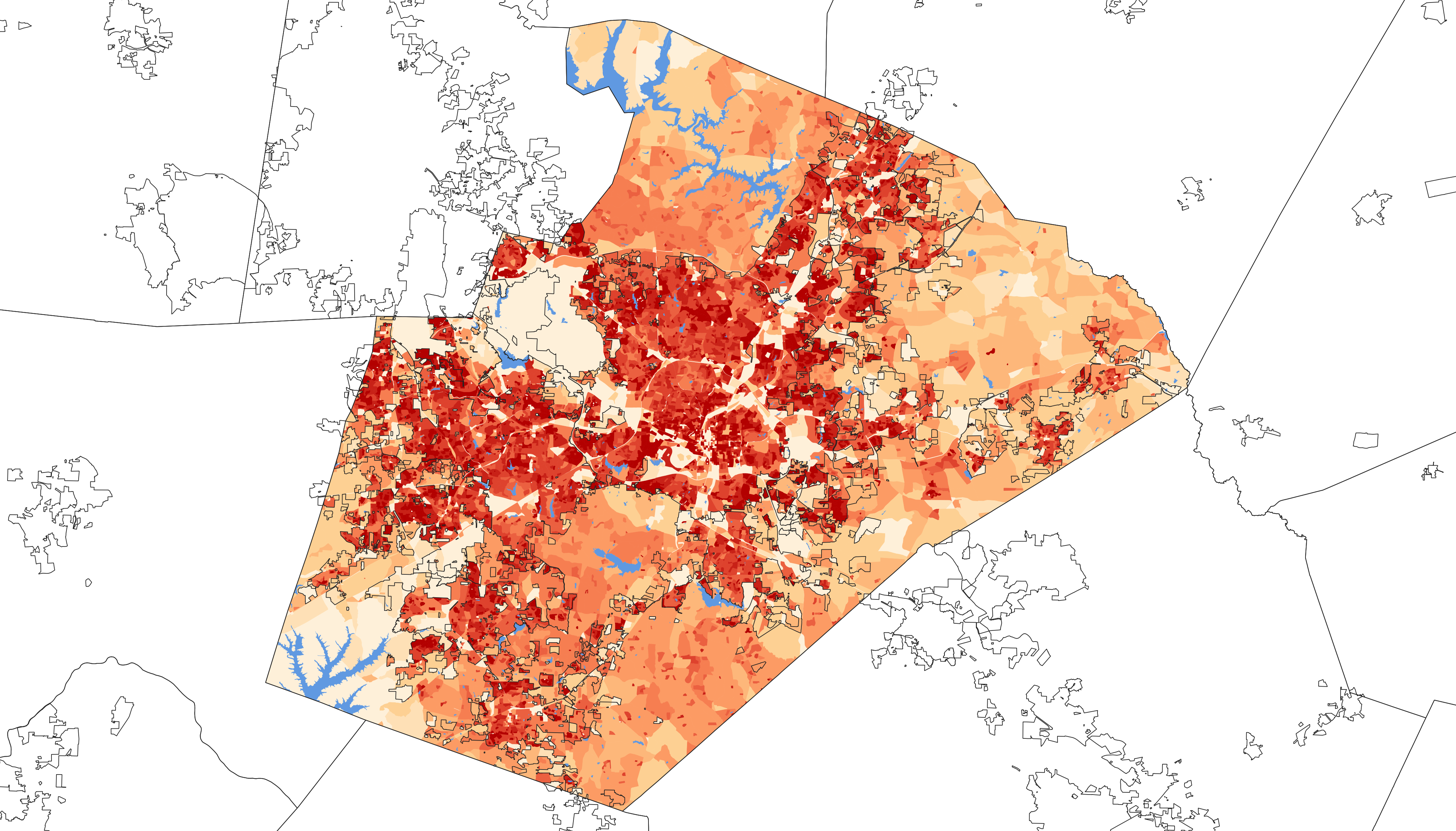
2020 population density of Wake County NC by census block

=== 2020 census ===
As of the 2020 census, the county had a population of 1,129,410, 437,043 households, and 279,243 families. The median age was 36.3 years, with 23.8% of residents under the age of 18 and 12.3% aged 65 or older. For every 100 females there were 94.2 males, and for every 100 females age 18 and over there were 91.4 males age 18 and over.

The racial makeup of the county was 58.8% White, 18.5% Black or African American, 0.5% American Indian and Alaska Native, 8.6% Asian, 0.1% Native Hawaiian and Pacific Islander, 6.0% from some other race, and 7.6% from two or more races. Hispanic or Latino residents of any race comprised 11.4% of the population.

94.8% of residents lived in urban areas, while 5.2% lived in rural areas.

There were 462,582 housing units, of which 5.5% were vacant. Among occupied housing units, 61.6% were owner-occupied and 38.4% were renter-occupied. The homeowner vacancy rate was 1.4% and the rental vacancy rate was 6.9%.

=== Racial and ethnic composition ===
Wake County, North Carolina – Racial and ethnic composition Note: the US Census treats Hispanic/Latino as an ethnic category. This table excludes Latinos from the racial categories and assigns them to a separate category. Hispanics/Latinos may be of any race.
| Race / Ethnicity (NH = Non-Hispanic) | Pop 1980 | Pop 1990 | Pop 2000 | Pop 2010 | Pop 2020 | % 1980 | % 1990 | % 2000 | % 2010 | % 2020 |
|---|---|---|---|---|---|---|---|---|---|---|
| White alone (NH) | 230,094 | 321,008 | 439,160 | 560,536 | 645,020 | 76.36% | 75.82% | 69.95% | 62.21% | 57.11% |
| Black or African American alone (NH) | 65,053 | 87,565 | 122,648 | 182,793 | 204,535 | 21.59% | 20.68% | 19.53% | 20.29% | 18.11% |
| Native American or Alaska Native alone (NH) | 517 | 1,113 | 1,821 | 2,537 | 2,760 | 0.17% | 0.26% | 0.29% | 0.28% | 0.24% |
| Asian alone (NH) | 2,315 | 8,076 | 21,183 | 48,287 | 96,665 | 0.77% | 1.91% | 3.37% | 5.36% | 8.56% |
| Native Hawaiian or Pacific Islander alone (NH) | x | x | 178 | 317 | 453 | x | x | 0.03% | 0.04% | 0.04% |
| Other race alone (NH) | 963 | 222 | 842 | 1,755 | 6,210 | 0.32% | 0.05% | 0.13% | 0.19% | 0.55% |
| Mixed race or Multiracial (NH) | x | x | 8,029 | 16,846 | 45,526 | x | x | 1.28% | 1.87% | 4.03% |
| Hispanic or Latino (any race) | 2,385 | 5,396 | 33,985 | 87,922 | 128,241 | 0.79% | 1.27% | 5.41% | 9.76% | 11.35% |
| Total | 301,327 | 423,380 | 627,846 | 900,993 | 1,129,410 | 100.00% | 100.00% | 100.00% | 100.00% | 100.00% |

=== 2018 census estimate ===
According to the 2018 census estimate, the median income for a household in the county was $54,988, and for a family was $67,149. Males had a median income of $44,472 versus $31,579 for females. The per capita income for the county was $27,004. About 4.90% of families and 7.80% of the population were below the poverty line, including 8.60% of those under age 18 and 8.90% of those age 65 or over.

In Wake County, 29% of the population is affiliated with the Southern Baptist Convention, 22% are affiliated with the Catholic Church, 17% are affiliated with the United Methodist Church, 6% are affiliated with the Presbyterian Church (USA), and 27% are religiously affiliated with other denominations or religions, or are not religiously affiliated.

=== 2025 census estimate ===
According to 2025 United States census data, Wake County's estimated 2025 total population was 1,261,494, with a growth rate of 2.36% in the previous year.

== Law and government ==
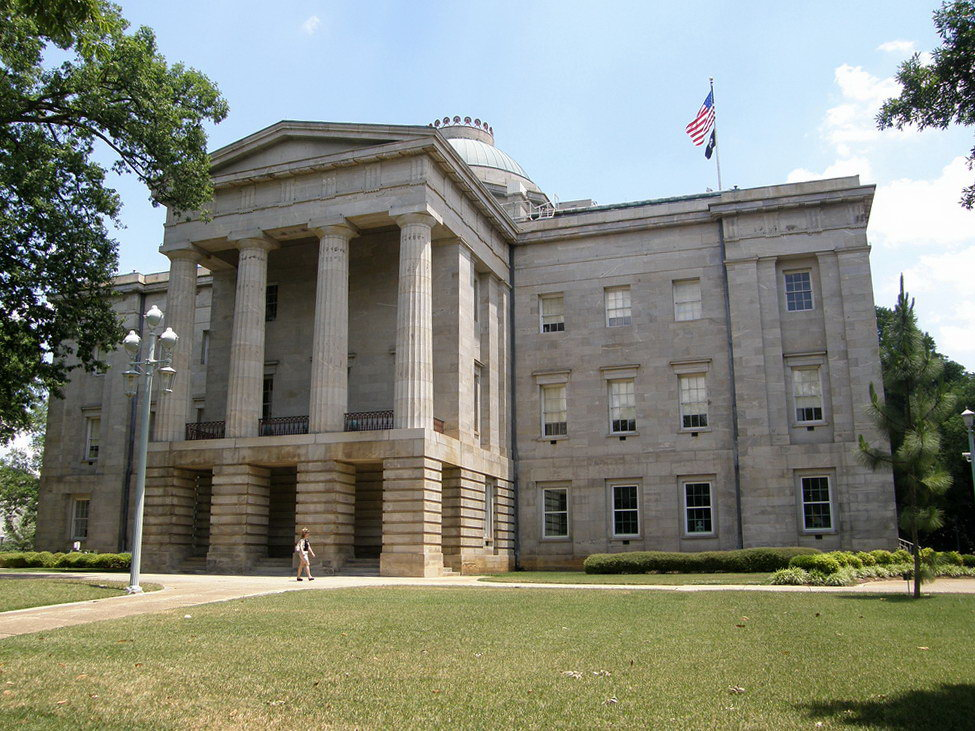
North Carolina State Capitol

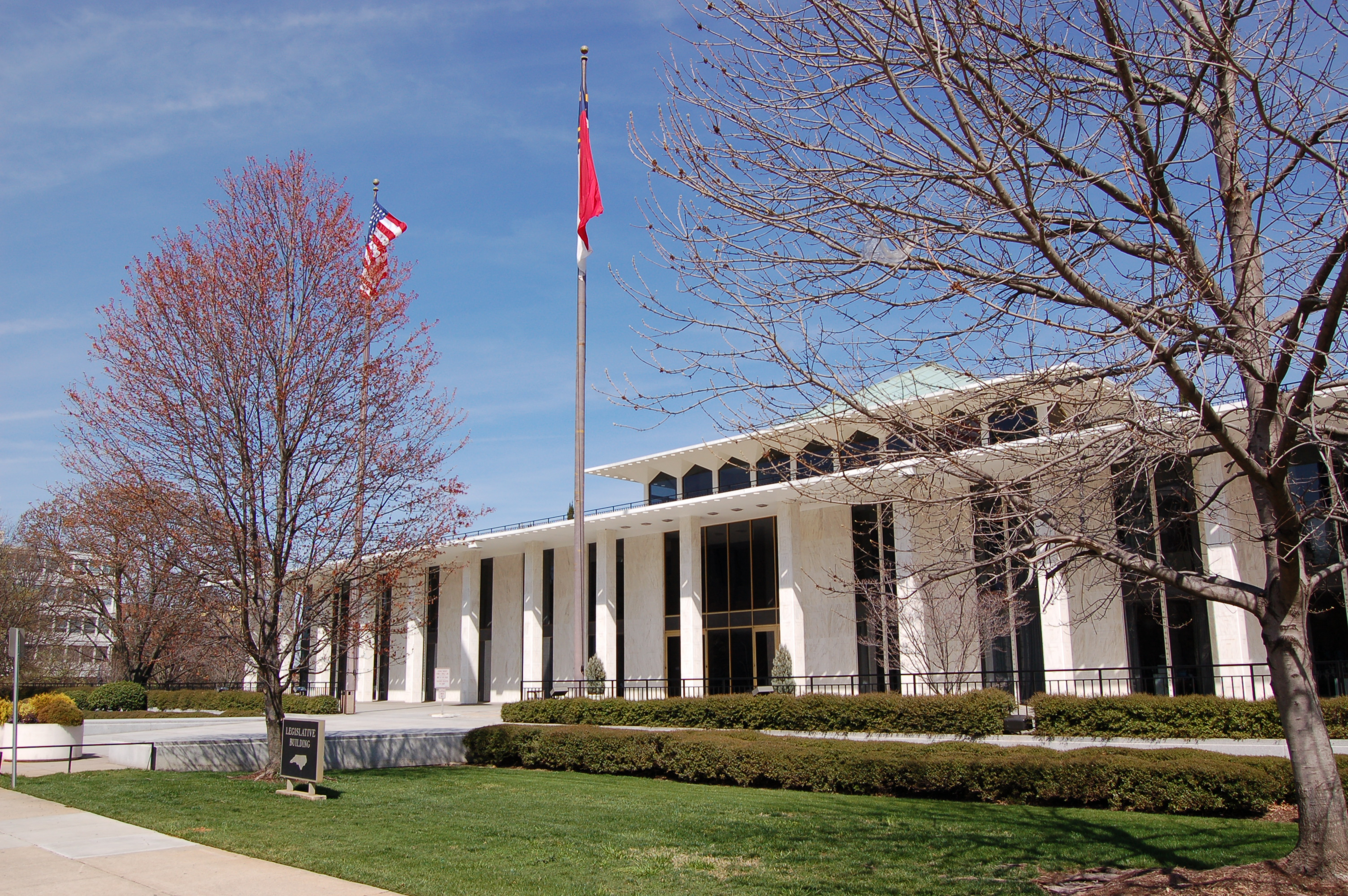
North Carolina State Legislative Building

The county is governed by the Wake County Board of Commissioners, a seven-member board of county commissioners, elected at large to serve four-year terms. Despite being selected by the whole county, each commissioner represents a district in which they live. Terms are staggered so that every two years, three or four commissioners are up for election. The commissioners enact policies such as the establishment of the property tax rate, regulation of land use and zoning outside municipal jurisdictions, and adoption of the annual budget. Commissioners meet on the first and third Mondays of each month. County voters also elect a register of deeds, who is responsible for maintaining legal records including property deeds, birth certificates, and marriage licenses.

Judicial branch facilities are housed primarily in the Wake County Courthouse and the Wake County Justice Center.

The first professional county manager was hired in 1965. Wake County is a member of the Central Pines Regional Council.

== Politics ==
For much of the 20th century, Wake County was politically dominated by conservative Democrats, many of them wealthy Raleighites. By the 1980s, enough socially-liberal Democrat and Republican professionals from the North had relocated to the county to break down this system of affairs. In 1994, Republicans won their first majority on the county commission in over 100 years. In 2009, Republicans won a majority on the Wake County Board of Education. Their majority lasted only two years due to several controversies including a student reassignment plan, and Democrats retook control of the board in 2011.

In 2008, the county swung hard to Barack Obama, who defeated John McCain 56 to 43 percent. Obama became the first Democrat since Lyndon Johnson to win a majority of the county's vote. In 2012, Obama won Wake County again over Mitt Romney with 54 percent of the vote to Romney's 44 percent – the first time in almost half a century that a Democrat carried the county in consecutive elections. Obama's performance in Wake mirrored his strong showing along Interstate 85. In 2016, Democratic nominee Hillary Clinton won the county 57 percent to Donald Trump's 37 percent, and in 2020 Joe Biden won the county with 62 percent of the vote to Donald Trump's 36 percent, reflecting the nationwide shift towards Democrats in urban and suburban areas. Biden's margin was the largest for a Democrat in the county since 1948. Trump was the first Republican in over 60 years to fail to receive at least 40 percent of the county's vote.

United States presidential election results for Wake County, North Carolina
| Year | Republican | | Democratic | | Third party(ies) | |
| Year | No. | % | No. | % | No. | % |
|---|---|---|---|---|---|---|
| 1876 | 4,441 | 50.72% | 4,315 | 49.28% | 0 | 0.00% |
| 1880 | 4,622 | 51.46% | 4,359 | 48.54% | 0 | 0.00% |
| 1884 | 4,291 | 47.45% | 4,750 | 52.52% | 3 | 0.03% |
| 1888 | 5,029 | 52.23% | 4,511 | 46.85% | 89 | 0.92% |
| 1892 | 1,987 | 22.98% | 3,724 | 43.07% | 2,935 | 33.95% |
| 1896 | 4,675 | 46.19% | 5,396 | 53.31% | 50 | 0.49% |
| 1900 | 3,947 | 45.18% | 4,774 | 54.65% | 15 | 0.17% |
| 1904 | 1,267 | 26.96% | 3,410 | 72.55% | 23 | 0.49% |
| 1908 | 2,961 | 44.30% | 3,713 | 55.55% | 10 | 0.15% |
| 1912 | 282 | 4.86% | 3,996 | 68.81% | 1,529 | 26.33% |
| 1916 | 2,461 | 34.70% | 4,627 | 65.23% | 5 | 0.07% |
| 1920 | 3,653 | 31.29% | 8,020 | 68.71% | 0 | 0.00% |
| 1924 | 2,975 | 25.14% | 8,376 | 70.77% | 485 | 4.10% |
| 1928 | 6,720 | 41.84% | 9,341 | 58.16% | 0 | 0.00% |
| 1932 | 2,170 | 12.56% | 14,863 | 86.02% | 246 | 1.42% |
| 1936 | 2,456 | 11.01% | 19,850 | 88.99% | 0 | 0.00% |
| 1940 | 2,665 | 12.84% | 18,083 | 87.16% | 0 | 0.00% |
| 1944 | 3,996 | 18.13% | 18,050 | 81.87% | 0 | 0.00% |
| 1948 | 4,850 | 19.86% | 17,939 | 73.45% | 1,634 | 6.69% |
| 1952 | 15,057 | 39.16% | 23,393 | 60.84% | 0 | 0.00% |
| 1956 | 15,194 | 40.39% | 22,427 | 59.61% | 0 | 0.00% |
| 1960 | 18,436 | 41.44% | 26,050 | 58.56% | 0 | 0.00% |
| 1964 | 22,542 | 41.59% | 31,653 | 58.41% | 0 | 0.00% |
| 1968 | 28,928 | 43.08% | 20,979 | 31.24% | 17,250 | 25.69% |
| 1972 | 56,808 | 70.32% | 22,807 | 28.23% | 1,174 | 1.45% |
| 1976 | 44,291 | 49.89% | 44,005 | 49.57% | 479 | 0.54% |
| 1980 | 49,768 | 47.31% | 49,003 | 46.58% | 6,422 | 6.10% |
| 1984 | 81,251 | 61.61% | 50,323 | 38.16% | 297 | 0.23% |
| 1988 | 81,613 | 56.87% | 61,352 | 42.75% | 539 | 0.38% |
| 1992 | 86,798 | 41.84% | 88,979 | 42.89% | 31,690 | 15.27% |
| 1996 | 108,780 | 48.18% | 103,574 | 45.88% | 13,401 | 5.94% |
| 2000 | 142,494 | 53.13% | 123,466 | 46.03% | 2,260 | 0.84% |
| 2004 | 177,324 | 50.83% | 169,909 | 48.71% | 1,611 | 0.46% |
| 2008 | 187,001 | 42.28% | 250,891 | 56.73% | 4,353 | 0.98% |
| 2012 | 211,596 | 43.50% | 267,262 | 54.94% | 7,569 | 1.56% |
| 2016 | 196,082 | 37.16% | 302,736 | 57.38% | 28,806 | 5.46% |
| 2020 | 226,197 | 35.80% | 393,336 | 62.25% | 12,297 | 1.95% |
| 2024 | 236,735 | 36.22% | 402,984 | 61.66% | 13,861 | 2.12% |

Democrats fared well in Wake County during the 2008 election. In the 1998 Senate race, John Edwards won in Wake County, which helped him defeat incumbent Republican Lauch Faircloth. In 2000 Mike Easley won the governor's race here with 55% of the vote. In 2004, Easley won again, winning with 59 percent to 40 percent for opponent Patrick Ballantine. Democrat Beverly Perdue won Wake County in the 2008 Governor's election by a 51 to 45 percent margin. In 2002, Republican candidate for U.S. Senate Elizabeth Dole defeated Democrat Erskine Bowles with 55% of the vote in Wake County, and won by a large margin statewide. However, in 2004, Bowles won the county with 52 percent, despite losing statewide to Richard Burr by the same margin. In 2008 Kay Hagan defeated Dole 56 to 40 percent.

Democratic strength is concentrated primarily in Raleigh, and the towns of Cary, Apex, and Morrisville. Republican strength is concentrated in the rural and exurban areas in the northern and southeastern parts of the county. The towns of Wake Forest and Fuquay-Varina, are mostly home to swing voters.

== Economy ==
Wake County's economy is heavily influenced by the Research Triangle Park (RTP), located between Durham and Raleigh. RTP is the country's largest industrial park and a primary center in the United States for high-tech and biotech research, as well as textile development. The park is home to more than 160 companies employing over 50,000 people. The largest employers in the Park include IBM (11,000 employees), GlaxoSmithKline (6,400 employees), and Cisco Systems (3,400 employees).

Wake County's industrial base includes electrical, medical, electronic and telecommunications equipment; clothing and apparel; food processing; paper products; and pharmaceuticals. The agriculture industry is visible in rural areas of the county, with tobacco, cotton, wheat, soybeans, and corn being the most common products grown.

SAS Institute, one of the largest privately held software companies in the world, is located in Cary, and Raleigh is home to the headquarters of Fortune 500 retailer Advance Auto Parts. Other major companies based in Wake County include A10 Networks, Verizon, 3Dsolve, Carquest, Butterball, Cotton Incorporated, Epic Games, Lord Corporation, Lenovo Group (U.S. headquarters), Tekelec, Red Hat, Golden Corral and Martin Marietta Materials.

In 2007, Forbes magazine listed Raleigh and Cary among the best cities to find jobs in the United States, as well as being the area ranked as the best place for business and careers. Also in 2007, CNN ranked the region as the third best area for job growth, the top region for technology workers, and Bizjournals.com ranked it as the fourth best place for young adult job seekers.

On April 26, 2021, Apple Inc. announced that they would build a $1 billion hub in the Wake County portion of the Research Triangle Park. It is expected to house a 1,000,000 square foot facility and hire more than 3,000 people with a minimum average salary of $185,000 per year.

== Transportation ==
=== Major highways ===
- I-40 is the only major Interstate Highway that runs through the county. It offers direct access to Raleigh-Durham International Airport, Cary, Garner, Morrisville, and Raleigh. It has two auxiliary routes in Wake County.
- I-440 is the northern, western, and eastern portion of the "Beltline" that encircles most of central Raleigh. It passes through the urban midtown North Hills (Raleigh) area in the northern part of the freeway and passes alongside the Lenovo Center as well as the Carter-Finley Stadium to the west. The southern portion of the Beltline is I-40.
- I-540 / NC 540 Toll is a 66-mile (106 km) partially completed loop that currently connects the satellite towns of Knightdale, Cary, Morrisville, Apex, and Holly Springs. The completed portion in northern Wake County is called the Northern Wake Expressway (I-540). It continues as a non-Interstate route, NC 540, in western Wake County, almost all of which is a toll road. The remaining segments to be constructed will also be designated as NC 540 and will be tolled, with an approximate cost of $2.2 billion and will be finishing construction by 2029. It will bypass Clayton to the south and go through Knightdale, meeting current I-540 at I-87.
- I-42 is a partially completed highway that currently exists in Clayton, NC and Goldsboro, NC, beginning at the I-40/NC-540/I-42 turbine interchange with future plans to connect all portions to the Northern Carteret Bypass just north of Beaufort, NC, providing a 137-mile route. All sections of US-70 that I-42 will run through are currently being converted to interstate standards and will be projected to fully open by 2032.
- I-87 / Future I-87 will hopefully connect I-40 to Norfolk, Virginia. Its Wake County section is concurrent with U.S. 64. The highway is currently signed as I-87 only where it already meets Interstate standards: along the Raleigh Beltline (where its southern terminus is at I-440's Exit 16 and I-40's Exit 301) and along the Knightdale Bypass, which runs from I-440 to the Business 64 exit between Knightdale and Wendell. East of this point, the road is a controlled-access freeway but does not meet interstate standards, so it is marked with "Future" I-87 signs. The "future" designation will be removed as the road is eventually upgraded by improving the road's shoulders, which are currently too narrow to qualify for an Interstate Highway designation. There is no timetable for these improvements. Interstate 87 will run along the same routing, and will eventually will be extended along US 64, US 17, and other roads (some yet to be built) to Norfolk.
- Future I-587 is a spur route from I-87 projected to extend from Zebulon, NC into the Wilson, NC area. The total length of the freeway including the already existing segment from Wilson to Greenville, NC will be 56 miles, with the final auxiliary route projected to fully open by 2026.
- I-885 / NC 885 Toll (originally NC 147 Toll)
- US 1
- US 64
- US 64 Bus.
- US 70
- US 70 Bus.
- US 264
- US 401
- US 401 Bus.
- NC 39
- NC 42
- NC 50
- NC 54
- NC 55
- NC 96
- NC 97
- NC 98
- NC 98 Bus.
- NC 231

==== Bicycles routes ====
The "Mountain to Sea" North Carolina Bicycle Route 2 travels through Wake County, as does the Maine-to-Florida U.S. Bicycle Route 1. North Carolina Bicycle Route 5, the "Cape Fear Run", connects Apex to the coastal city of Wilmington.

=== Major infrastructure ===
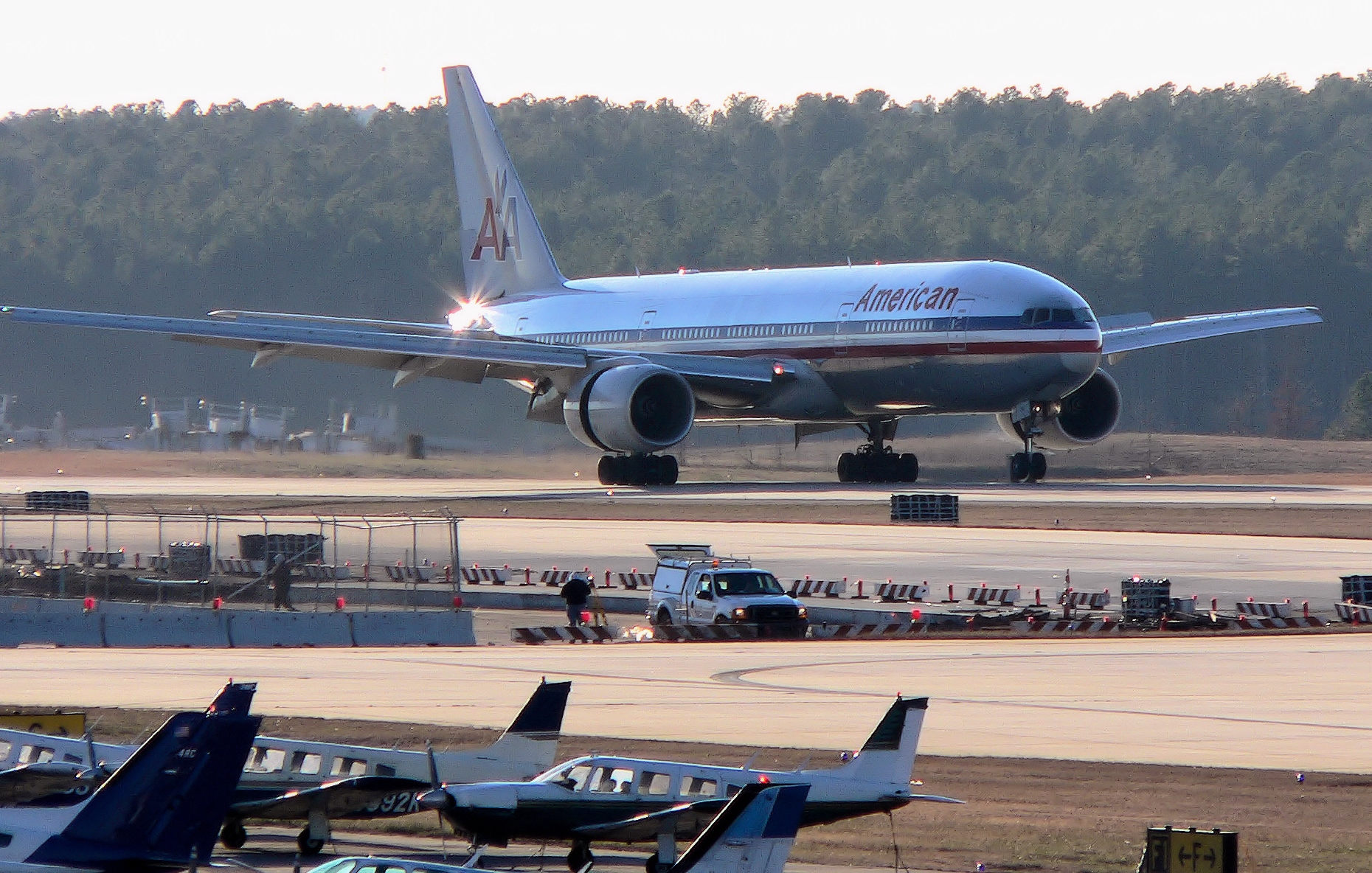
Raleigh-Durham International Airport is located in the center of Research Triangle Park

- Cary Station
- GoTriangle, operates buses that serve the region and connect to municipal bus systems in Raleigh, Durham, Cary and Chapel Hill.
- New Hope Valley Railway
- North Carolina State Fair Station, seasonal Amtrak station that serves the North Carolina State Fair in October
- Raleigh-Durham International Airport, located in northwestern Wake County off Interstate 40. The airport offers service to more than 35 domestic and international destinations. The airport currently serves more than 14 million passengers a year.
- Raleigh Union Station
- Triple W Airport

== Education ==
=== Higher education ===
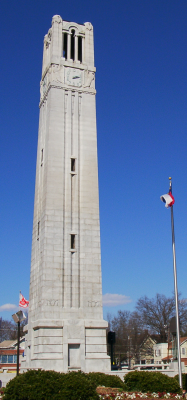
North Carolina State University Memorial Belltower

Wake County is home to eight institutions of higher learning. They include Meredith College, North Carolina State University, Campbell University's Norman Adrian Wiggins School of Law, Peace College, Saint Augustine's College, Shaw University, Southeastern Baptist Theological Seminary and Wake Technical Community College.

The State Library of North Carolina is an institution which serves North Carolina libraries, state government employees, genealogists, and the citizens of North Carolina. There are two locations in Raleigh.

=== Primary and secondary education ===
Public education in Wake County is administered by the Wake County Public School System, the 15th largest public school district in the country with over 155,000 students. There are 27 high schools, 33 middle schools, 104 elementary schools, and eight specialized schools. In addition, nine charter schools and 31 private schools are located in the county.

=== Libraries ===
The Wake County Public Library system operates 22 branches throughout the county. There are 11 facilities in Raleigh. Cary and Apex each have two facilities. Holly Springs, Fuquay-Varina, Garner, Wake Forest, Zebulon, Knightdale and Wendell each have one library facility. The Wake County library system keeps books, periodicals, and audio books and has recently expanded the selection to include downloadable e-books.

== Healthcare ==
Wake County is served by three healthcare systems: WakeMed Health & Hospitals, UNC Rex Healthcare, and Duke Raleigh Hospital.

In addition to WakeMed's Raleigh main campus, the system operates two community hospitals, a rehabilitation hospital, a mental health hospital and four outpatient "healthplexes" with full-service ERs in the county.

== Culture ==
=== Museums ===
- North Carolina Museum of Art
- North Carolina Museum of Natural Sciences
- North Carolina Museum of History
- City of Raleigh Museum
- Marbles Kids Museum
- J.C. Raulston Arboretum
- Joel Lane House
- Page-Walker Hotel
- Mordecai House
- North Carolina Railroad Museum
- Pope House Museum
- Contemporary Art Museum of Raleigh

=== Performing arts ===
A number of outdoor concert venues regularly host major international touring acts. Among these are Coastal Credit Union Music Park, located in Southeast Raleigh, Red Hat Amphitheater, located in downtown Raleigh, Koka Booth Amphitheatre, located in Cary, and the North Carolina Museum of Art's Amphitheater, located in West Raleigh. Numerous smaller theaters and clubs also host concerts throughout the county. Occasionally the larger sporting venues such as PNC Arena and Carter-Finley Stadium do as well.

The Duke Energy Center for the Performing Arts complex houses the Raleigh Memorial Auditorium, the Fletcher Opera Theater, the Kennedy Theatre, and the Meymandi Concert Hall. Theater performances are also offered at the Raleigh Little Theatre, Theatre in the Park and Stewart Theater at North Carolina State University in Raleigh. Applause! Cary Youth Theatre, Cary Players Community Theatre, Sertoma Amphitheater at Bond Park, are located in Cary. Other theaters and performing arts locations include The Halle Cultural Arts Center in Apex and Garner Historic Auditorium in Garner. Local colleges and universities add to the options available for viewing live performances.

Wake County is home to several professional arts organizations, including the North Carolina Symphony, the Opera Company of North Carolina, the North Carolina Theatre, and Carolina Ballet.

=== Visual arts ===
The North Carolina Museum of Art, occupying a large suburban campus on Blue Ridge Road near the State Fairgrounds, houses one of the premier public art collections between Washington, D.C., and Atlanta. In addition to collections of American art, European art, African art, and ancient art, the museum recently has hosted major exhibitions featuring Auguste Rodin (in 2000) and Claude Monet (in 2006–07), each attracting more than 200,000 visitors. The museum is currently hosting a special exhibition of contemporary installation art called You Are Here: Light, Color, and Sound Experiences. Unlike most public museums, the North Carolina Museum of Art acquired a large number of the works in its permanent collection through purchases with public funds. The museum's outdoor park is one of the largest such art parks in the country.

Located in downtown Raleigh, the Contemporary Art Museum of Raleigh offers a continuously rotating and updated exhibitions of modern and contemporary art and multimedia.

== Sports ==
=== Professional ===
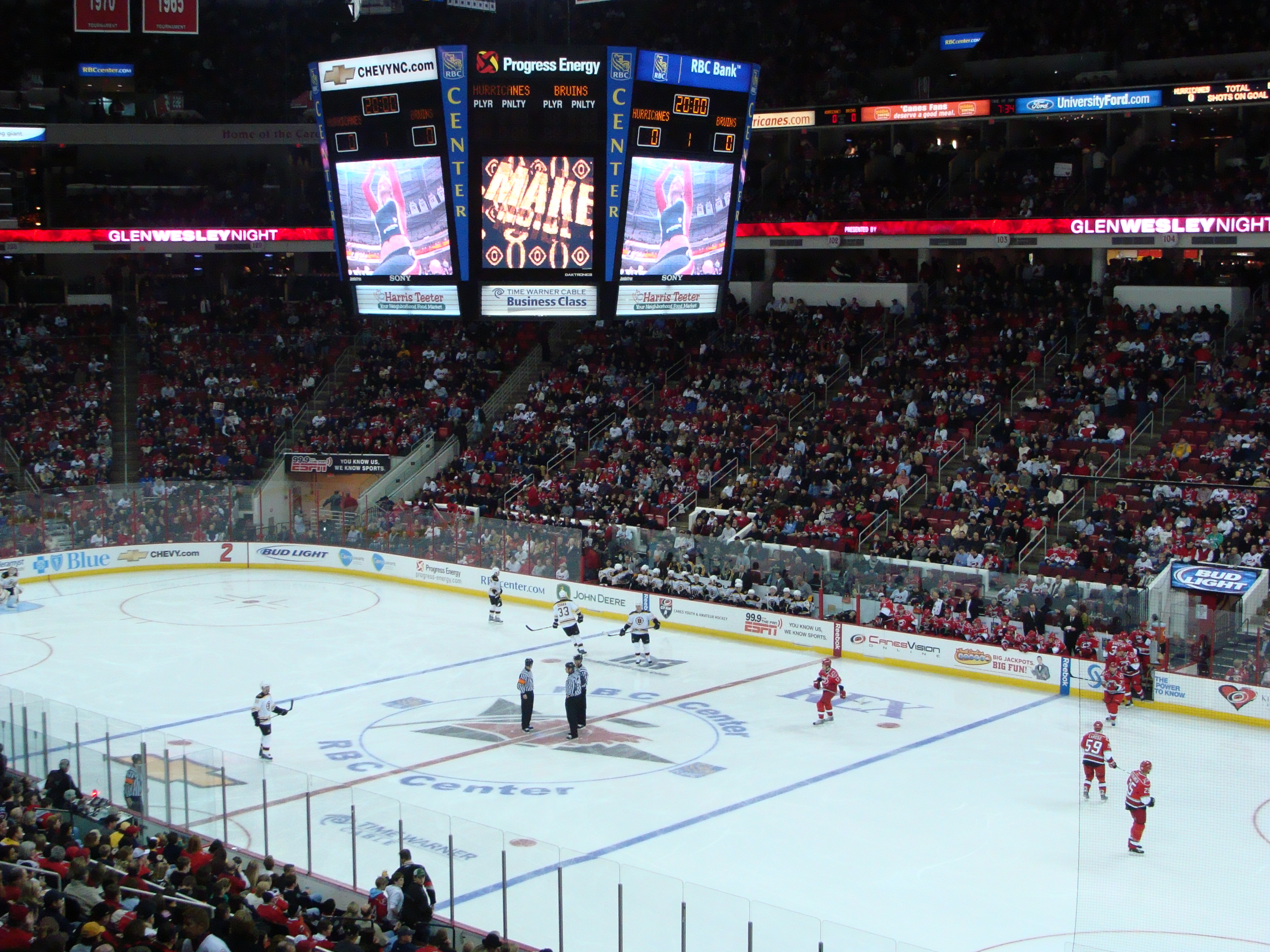
Carolina Hurricanes hockey game at the RBC Center, now (Lenovo Center)

The National Hockey League's Carolina Hurricanes franchise moved to Raleigh in 1999 from their temporary home of Greensboro, after having departed Hartford, Connecticut, in 1997. Their home arena, the Lenovo Center, also hosts concerts and other public events. The Hurricanes are the only major league (NFL, NHL, NBA, MLB) professional sports team in North Carolina to have won a championship, winning the Stanley Cup in 2006 and 2026.

North Carolina FC of the United Soccer League and the affiliated women's team North Carolina Courage of the National Women's Soccer League are located in Cary and play at the WakeMed Soccer Park. The Courage is the reigning NWSL Shield Winner and NWSL Champion, breaking the NWSL season record for most wins, points, and goals in the process.

The Carolina Mudcats are a minor league baseball team located in eastern Wake County. Their ballpark, Five County Stadium, is located in Zebulon.

The Research Triangle region has hosted the Professional Golfers' Association (PGA) Nationwide Tour Rex Hospital Open since 1994, with the current location of play at Raleigh's Wakefield Plantation. In 2024 The Rex Hospital Open was changed to the UNC Health Championship and is now played at Raleigh Country Club, located on just east of downtown Raleigh.

=== College ===
North Carolina State University, which is a member of the Atlantic Coast Conference (ACC) and National Collegiate Athletic Association (NCAA) Division I, plays their home basketball games at the PNC Arena and home football games at Carter–Finley Stadium.

Other institutions of higher learning that compete in competitive sports include St. Augustine's College (NCAA Division II, Central Intercollegiate Athletic Association (CIAA)), Meredith College (NCAA Division III and USA South Athletic Conference), William Peace University (NCAA Division III, USA South Athletic Conference), Shaw University Division II, Central Intercollegiate Athletic Association (CIAA)), and Wake Technical Community College (NJCAA).

=== Amateur ===
The Raleigh Cú Chulainn, which includes a Hurling team and a Gaelic football team, is based in Wake County. The football team won the 2014 Men's Junior Championship in North American Gaelic Athletic Association competition.

The North Carolina Tigers, an Australian Rules football club in the United States Australian Football League (USAFL) and competing in the Eastern Australian Football League (EAFL), are based in Raleigh.

Wake County is also home to the Carolina Rollergirls, an all-women flat-track roller derby team that is a competing member of the Women's Flat Track Derby Association (WFTDA). The Carolina Rollergirls compete at the North Carolina State Fairground's Dorton Arena.

Because of the area's many billiards rooms, Raleigh is home to one of the largest amateur league franchises for playing pool, the Raleigh, Durham, Chapel Hill American Poolplayers Association. There are leagues available in eight-ball, nine-ball, and Masters formats for players of any skill level.

The USA Baseball National Training Complex is located in Cary.

Home of the Capital City Steelers three time national champions of Pop Warner Football.

Also featured in Raleigh/Durham is the Carolina Phoenix, Women's Professional Tackle Football team.

== Communities ==
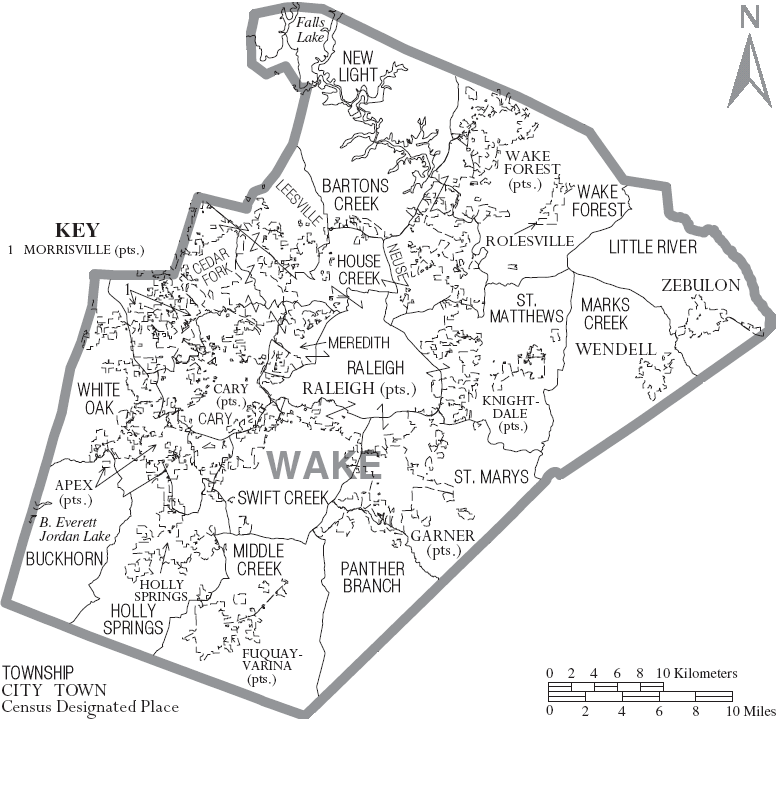
Map of Wake County with municipal and township labels

=== Cities ===
- Durham (small part; mostly in Durham County)
- Raleigh (state capital, county seat, and largest community in the county; small part in Durham County)

=== Towns ===
- Apex
- Cary (small part in Chatham County)
- Fuquay-Varina
- Garner
- Holly Springs
- Knightdale
- Morrisville (small part in Durham County)
- Rolesville
- Wake Forest (small part in Franklin County)
- Wendell
- Zebulon (partly in Johnston County)

=== Townships ===
- Bartons Creek
- Buckhorn
- Cary
- Cedar Fork
- Holly Springs
- House Creek
- Leesville
- Little River
- Marks Creek
- Meredith
- Middle Creek
- Neuse
- New Light
- Panther Branch
- Raleigh
- St. Mary's
- St. Matthew's
- Swift Creek
- Wake Forest
- White Oak

=== Unincorporated communities ===
- Asbury
- Auburn
- Banks
- Barham
- Bayleaf
- Bonsal
- Carpenter
- Clegg
- Eagle Rock
- Falls
- Feltonville
- Five Points
- Forestville
- Fowlers Crossroads
- Friendship
- Green Level
- Holland
- Hollemans Crossroads
- Hopkins
- Kennebec
- Lassiter
- Leesville
- Lizard Lick
- Macks Village
- McCullers
- McCullers Crossroads
- Medfield
- Mount Pleasant
- Neuse
- New Hill
- New Hope
- New Light
- Purnell
- Riley Hill
- Sandy Plain
- Shotwell
- Six Forks
- Stony Hill
- Wake Crossroads
- Walkers Crossroads
- Westover
- Wilbon
- Williams Crossroads
- Willow Spring
- Wyatt

== See also ==
- List of counties in North Carolina
- National Register of Historic Places listings in Wake County, North Carolina
