= Bill Wynne (baseball) =

American baseball player (1869–1951)

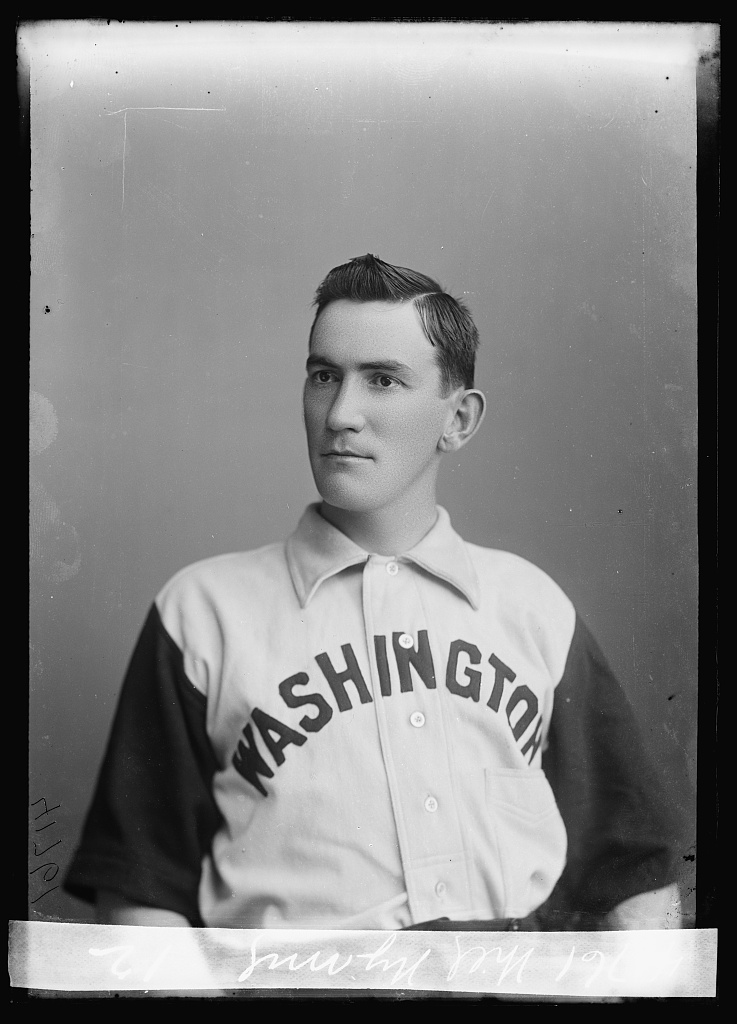
- Will Wynne - Washington Senators
- Pitcher
- Born: March 27, 1869; Neuse, North Carolina, U.S.
- Died: August 7, 1951 (aged 82); Raleigh, North Carolina, U.S.
- Batted: Right Threw: Right

MLB debut
- August 31, 1894, for the Washington Senators

Last MLB appearance
- August 31, 1894, for the Washington Senators

MLB statistics
- Win–loss record: 0-1
- Earned run average: 6.75
- Strikeouts: 2
- Stats at Baseball Reference

Teams
- Washington Senators (1894)

William Andrew Wynne (March 27, 1869 – August 7, 1951) was an American professional baseball pitcher. He played one game in Major League Baseball for the Washington Senators of the National League.

Wynne went to school at Wake Forest University and began his professional career with the Columbia Senators in the South Atlantic League in 1892. On August 31, 1894, Wynne started the second game of a doubleheader against the Philadelphia Phillies. He pitched a complete game, allowing eight earned runs. After his brief MLB career, he played in the minors until 1895.
