= McCullers =

McCullers is a surname. Notable people with the surname include:

- Carson McCullers (1917–1967), American writer
- Dale McCullers (born 1947), American football player
- Daniel McCullers (born 1992), American former football player
- Lance McCullers (born 1964), American baseball player
- Lance McCullers Jr. (born 1993), American baseball player
- Michael McCullers (born 1971), American screenwriter

== See also ==
- McCullers Crossroads, North Carolina, unincorporated community in the United States
- Arnold McCuller (born 1950), American vocalist, songwriter, and record producer
