= Bartons Creek Township, Wake County, North Carolina =

Township in North Carolina, United States

Coordinates: 35.9506642°N 78.6455475°W

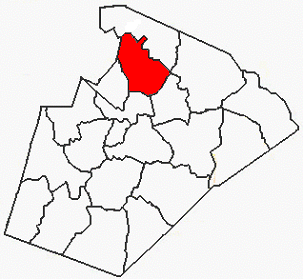

Bartons Creek Township (also designated Township 2) is one of twenty townships within Wake County, North Carolina, United States. As of the 2010 United States census, Bartons Creek Township had a population of 22,055.

The township occupies 38.0 square miles (98.3 km^{2}) in the northwestern corner of Wake County, including portions of the city of Raleigh.

The township is bounded by the border with Durham County, Old Creedmoor Rd, Baileywick Rd, Creedmoor Rd, Strickland Rd, Falls of Neuse Rd, the Neuse River, and Falls Lake. The community of Falls is located partially within the township. Notable features include the Mountains-to-Sea Trail, Falls Lake State Recreation Area, and Blue Jay Point County Park. The entire township is within the Falls Lake watershed. I-540 goes through the southern portion of the township.
