= Local Planning and Development Regulation in North Carolina =

In 2019, the North Carolina General Assembly adopted Chapter 160D Local Planning and Development Regulation.The chapter unified existing city and county planning and development regulations into a single chapter, and required local jurisdictions to bring their ordinances into conformance by July 1, 2021.

== Legislative History ==
North Carolina's planning and development regulations for cities had been consolidated into Article 19 of General Statutes Chapter 160A in 1971. The regulations for counties were consolidated into Article 18 of Chapter 153A in 1973. In the decades that followed, hundreds of amendments were added to these chapters without a consistent structure.

The North Carolina chapter of the American Planning Association proposed reforms which were adopted in 2005. The purpose of these reforms was to simplify, modernize, and make technical changes to the existing land use and planning laws. The reform bills were sponsored by state Senator Daniel G. Clodfelter and Representative Lucy T. Allen. The 2005 reforms included the following key provisions:

- authorized conditional zoning through a legislative process
- required plan consistency for all zoning amendments
- required statement of reasonableness for spot zoning
- authorized unified development ordinances (UDOs)
- created a process for development moratoria
- allowed development agreements and use of sketch plans and preliminary plats in subdivision review
- clarified provisions for subdivision completion performance guarantees
- allowed sale of lots based on approved preliminary plat, and
- codified rules about conflict of interest.

North Carolina Planning and Development Regulations
1905	building standards
1919	planning statutes
1923	municipal zoning
1939	housing codes
1955	municipal subdivision regulation
1959	enabling statutes extended to counties, municipal extraterritorial jurisdictions
1963	open space protection
1971	historic and landmark protection, community appearance
1979	floodplain zoning
2005	development agreements, modernization
2013	quasi-judicial land use decisions, boards of adjustment
2019	unification; consensus reforms

The North Carolina Bar Association's Zoning, Planning, and Land Use (NCBA ZPLU) section proposed several subsequent reforms. The most significant of these focused on quasi-judicial land use decisions and boards of adjustment, and were adopted in 2013. This law also modernized the text of the statute, including use of gender-neutral language. The law passed with unanimous approval under unified Republican control of the state government.

Beginning in 2013, NCBA ZPLU attorneys working on the reforms also began to draft the more comprehensive proposal that became Chapter 160D. Their initial proposal was completed by October 2014 and was circulated widely for comment among local government officials and development interest groups. After substantial revision, the proposal was introduced in the House by Paul Stam, Susie Hamilton, Dan Bishop, and Rob Bryan. Unresolved issues raised by development interests prevented the bill from being brought to a vote in the 2015 or 2016 House session. In 2017, an updated version of the bill was introduced in the Senate by Michael Lee and Floyd McKissick, Jr. It passed the Senate, but was not considered by the House in 2017 or 2018. In 2019, a further revised version was introduced in the Senate by Paul Newton and Floyd McKissick, Jr. The bill passed smoothly through both the Senate and the House and was signed into law as S.L. 2019-111 by Governor Roy Cooper.

== Overview of Chapter 160D ==
Chapter 160D aims to provide a consistent set of laws and procedures for regulation of development by cities and counties in North Carolina. While this law did not make major policy changes, it did include minor changes to the existing regulations in addition to clarifying amendments and consensus reforms. The following sections describe the purpose of each of the chapter's 14 articles, along with key changes where applicable.

=== Article 1. General provisions ===
Article 1 includes provisions that apply to all development regulations, including definitions. For example, the following definition is offered of the term 'development':

Unless the context clearly indicates otherwise, the term means any of the following:

a. The construction, erection, alteration, enlargement, renovation, substantial repair, movement to another site, or demolition of any structure.

b. The excavation, grading, filling, clearing, or alteration of land.

c. The subdivision of land as defined in G.S. 160D-802.

d. The initiation or substantial change in the use of land or the intensity of use of land.

The section also offers definitions of the three types of development decisions in North Carolina law: legislative, quasi-judicial, and administrative clarifies new procedural requirements for these decisions.These definitions are key to one of Chapter 160D's most substantive policy changes, repeal of the provisions for conditional use districts and their replacement with special-use permits issued through a quasi-judicial process and conditional zoning through a legislative process.

=== Article 2. Planning and Development Regulation Jurisdiction ===
In North Carolina, cities and counties have jurisdiction for development regulation. Cities have jurisdiction within their boundaries and may also regulate an extraterritorial jurisdiction (ETJ) around the city. Counties regulate the unincorporated areas that are not part of an ETJ.

Chapter 160D specifies that if a city does not extend every type of development regulation in an ETJ, the county may choose to enforce its regulation in that area, resulting, for example, in an ETJ subject to municipal zoning codes, but county housing codes.

=== Article 3. Boards and Organizational Arrangements ===
This section specifies the provisions for board composition and duties for planning boards, boards of adjustment, historic preservation commissions, and similar bodies. Chapter 160D clarifies and simplifies the provisions for ensuring residents of ETJs are represented on city boards.

=== Article 4. Administration, Enforcement, and Appeals ===
Notable changes in this section include stronger conflict of interest provisions for administrative staff and explicit provisions for notices of violation as tool to enforce development regulation.

=== Article 5. Planning ===
Chapter 160D created a requirement that local governments adopt and maintain a comprehensive plan or land use plan through a legislative process by July 1, 2022 in order to adopt new zoning regulations or to continue their existing zoning code.

=== Article 6. Process for Adoption of Development Regulations ===
This section establishes a consistent legislative process for all development decisions, with additional requirements for zoning code and zoning map amendments. City government voting rules are aligned with the county rules to allow development regulations to be adopted on first reading by a simple majority vote.

=== Article 7. Zoning Regulation ===
Chapter 160D makes several significant changes to zoning regulations.

For example, it removes local governments' authority to have conditional use district zoning. Conditional use district zoning was a complex combination of legislative and quasi-judicial processes. Effective January 1, 2021, existing conditional-use districts became legislative conditional zoning and conditional-use permits became quasi-judicial special-use permits.

The chapter also introduces provisions for conditional zoning, special-use permits, and other development approvals to be modified administratively, as long as the local statute defines an acceptable scope for a modification to be considered minor.

Chapter 160D also confirms that local governments may adopt form-based zoning codes, which focus on the physical characteristics of buildings rather than the more common use-based zoning.

Local governments are now required to maintain copies of current and prior zoning maps, as well as maps incorporated by reference, available for public inspection.

=== Article 8. Subdivision Regulation ===
Subdivision regulation was reorganized for clarity but not significantly changed.

=== Article 9. Regulation of Particular Uses and Areas ===
Article 9 mainly brings together regulations of specific land uses and areas that had been located throughout the statutes. Situations addressed include agricultural uses, manufactured homes, and historic preservation.

=== Article 10. Development Agreements ===
This section includes some minor changes that simplify development. It removes the requirement for development agreements to be consistent with comprehensive plans, because those plans are advisory rather than regulatory. It also allows the development agreement to be considered at the same time as amendments to the zoning text and zoning map, including conditional zoning. Previous requirements for the agreement to include a schedule and a list of all required permits were removed.

The section also includes new enforcement provisions in the form of financial penalties and the ability for either the development or the local government to bring a lawsuit.

=== Article 11. Building Code Enforcement ===
Changes to building code enforcement were minimal.

=== Article 12. Minimum Housing Codes ===
Changes to minimum housing codes were minimal. It standardizes a process for local governments to follow to check if the owner of a structure in poor condition intends to repair it.

=== Article 13. Additional Authorities ===
Changes to this section, which relates to local governments' acquisition of open space and their participation in programs for community development, redevelopment, and energy finance.

=== Article 14. Judicial Review ===
This section clarifies procedures individuals can use to challenge legislative zoning decisions, quasi-judicial decisions like certificates of appropriateness for historic preservation, and administrative decisions such as those related to subdivision plats.

=== Implementation ===
When Chapter 160D was signed into law in July 2019, it included an effective date of January 1, 2021. The law required local governments to update their ordinances to conform with the law. The effective date was later postponed to July 1, 2021 to give local governments more time, in part due to the COVID-19 pandemic's effects on government operations.

Regional councils provided support to local governments to help them adjust their local ordinances to conform to the law. This type of regional collaboration was especially important to small cities with limited resources.

New Hanover County updated its ordinances to remove the confusing conditional use district process, along with other changes. For nearby Pender County, which had never used conditional use districts, only minor updates were needed.

The city of Charlotte needed to complete its comprehensive plan and unified development ordinance, already under development, to meet the deadline imposed by Chapter 160D.
