= Forestville, North Carolina =

Unincorporated community in North Carolina, US

Coordinates: 35°57′42″N 78°31′05″W

Forestville is a formerly unincorporated community in Wake County, North Carolina, United States, east of Falls at an elevation of 390 feet or 119 m. It currently lies within the town of Wake Forest, south of the intersection of NC 98 (Dr. Calvin Jones Highway) and US 1 Alternate (South Main Street).
