= Wake Forest Township, Wake County, North Carolina =

Township in Wake County, North Carolina, U.S.

Coordinates: 35.9472303°N 78.4979248°W

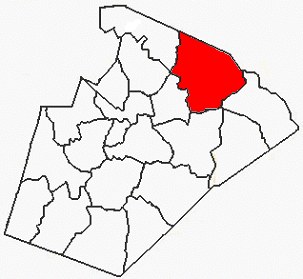

Wake Forest Township (also designated Township 19) is one of twenty townships within Wake County, North Carolina, United States. As of the 2010 United States census, Wake Forest Township had a population of 65,491, a 119.4% increase over 2000.

Wake Forest Township, occupying 73.4 square miles (190.1 km^{2}) in northern Wake County, includes portions of the city of Raleigh and the entirety of the towns of Wake Forest and Rolesville.
