= Feltonville, North Carolina =

Unincorporated community in North Carolina, US

Coordinates: 35°41′00″N 78°50′01″W

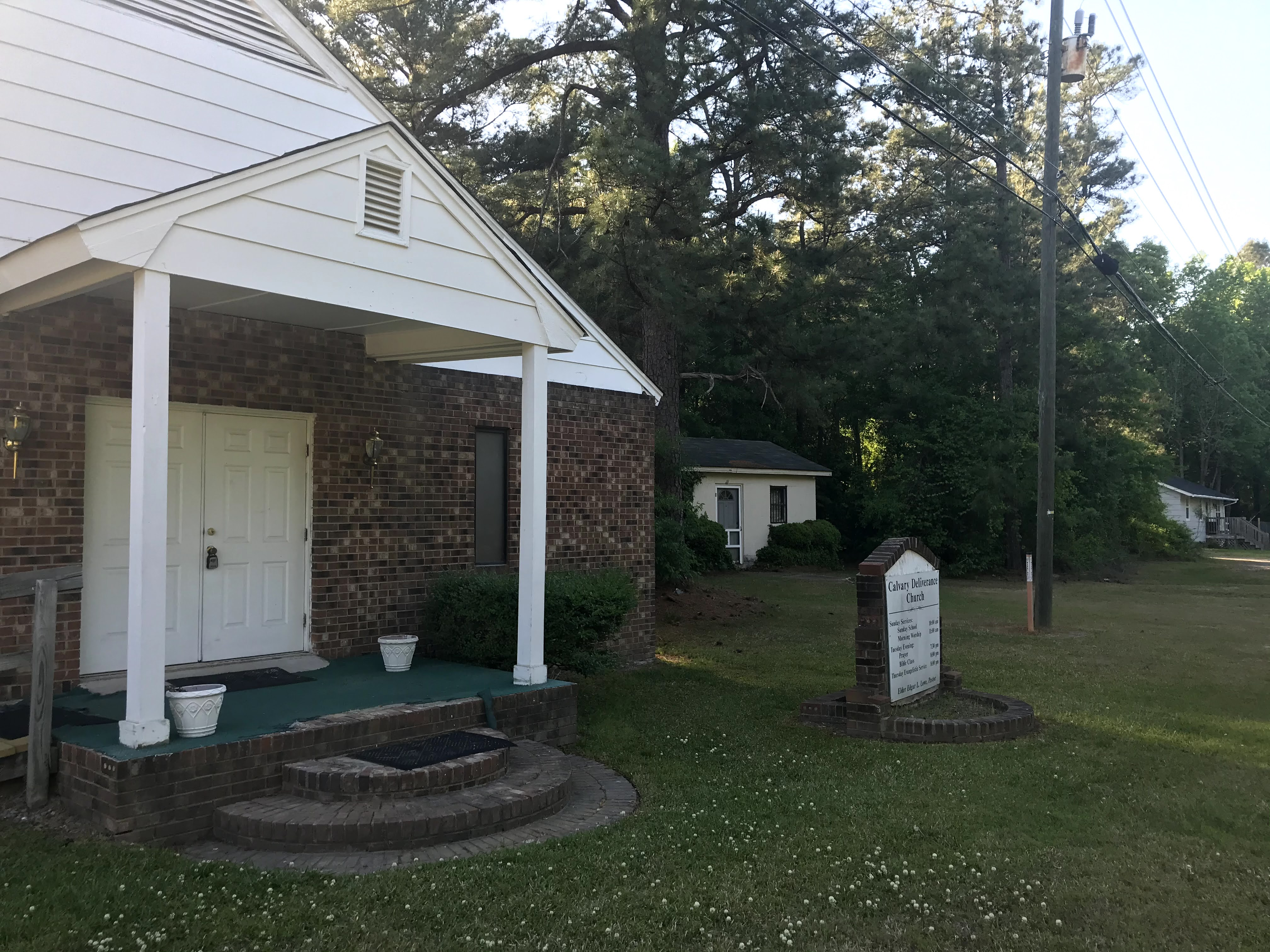
Feltonville, North Carolina

Feltonville is an unincorporated community in Wake County in the U.S. state of North Carolina. It is located north of Holly Springs, near where North Carolina Highway 540 meets North Carolina Highway 55, south of Apex.
