= Marks Creek Township, Wake County, North Carolina =

Township in Wake County, North Carolina, U.S.

Coordinates: 35.8093444°N 78.4069732°W

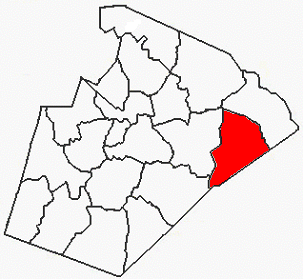

Marks Creek Township (also designated Township 10) is one of twenty townships within Wake County, North Carolina, United States. As of the 2010 United States census, Marks Creek Township had a population of 21,932, a 34.7% increase over 2000.

Marks Creek Township, occupying 53.1 square miles (137.4 km^{2}) in eastern Wake County, includes the entire town of Wendell.
