= Stony Hill, North Carolina =

Unincorporated community in North Carolina, US

Coordinates: 35°58′54″N 78°36′43″W

Stony Hill is an unincorporated community in Wake County, North Carolina, United States at an elevation of 407 feet or 124 m. The center of the community is at the intersection of North Carolina Highway 98 and Stony Hill Road. There is a fire station further north on Stony Hill Road.
