= Unified Development Ordinance =

A Unified Development Ordinance (UDO), also referred to as Unified Development Code (UDC), is a kind of American land-use planning regulation. A UDO is a document in which traditional zoning and subdivision regulations are combined with other desired city regulations, such as design guidelines and water management, into a single document. It serves as a local policy instrument. A UDO may help local governments to respond better to the way development occurs and help avoid overlapping regulations.
