= McCullers Crossroads, North Carolina =

- Unincorporated community
- Location of McCullers Crossroads in North Carolina McCullers Crossroads, North Carolina (the United States)
- Coordinates: 35°39′54″N 78°41′57″W
- Country: United States
- State: North Carolina
- County: Wake
- Elevation: 417 ft (127 m)
- Time zone: UTC-5 (Eastern (EST))
  - Summer (DST): UTC-4 (EDT)
- ZIP code: 27603
- Area code: 919
- GNIS feature ID: 989553

McCullers Crossroads is an unincorporated community in southern Wake County, North Carolina, United States, located midway between Raleigh and Fuquay Varina. It lies at the intersection of US 401 (Fayetteville Road) and SR 1010 (Ten-Ten Road). Wake Technical Community College has its main campus nearby.
