= New Light Township, Wake County, North Carolina =

Township in Wake County, North Carolina, U.S.

Coordinates: 36.010°N 78.605°W

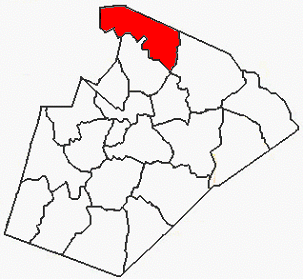

New Light Township (also designated Township 14) is one of twenty townships within Wake County, North Carolina, United States. As of the 2010 United States census, New Light Township had a population of 7,591, a 61.2% increase over 2000.

New Light Township, occupying 49.5 square miles (128.2 km^{2}) north of Falls Lake at the northern trip of Wake County, is the only Wake County township which contains no portions of any incorporated municipalities.
