= Neuse, North Carolina =

Unincorporated community in North Carolina, US

Coordinates: 35°53′51″N 78°34′09″W

Neuse is an unincorporated community in Neuse Township, Wake County, North Carolina, United States. Located on the Neuse River, it is approximately nine miles north-northeast of downtown Raleigh.
