= Falls Lake =

Man-made reservoir in North Carolina, United States

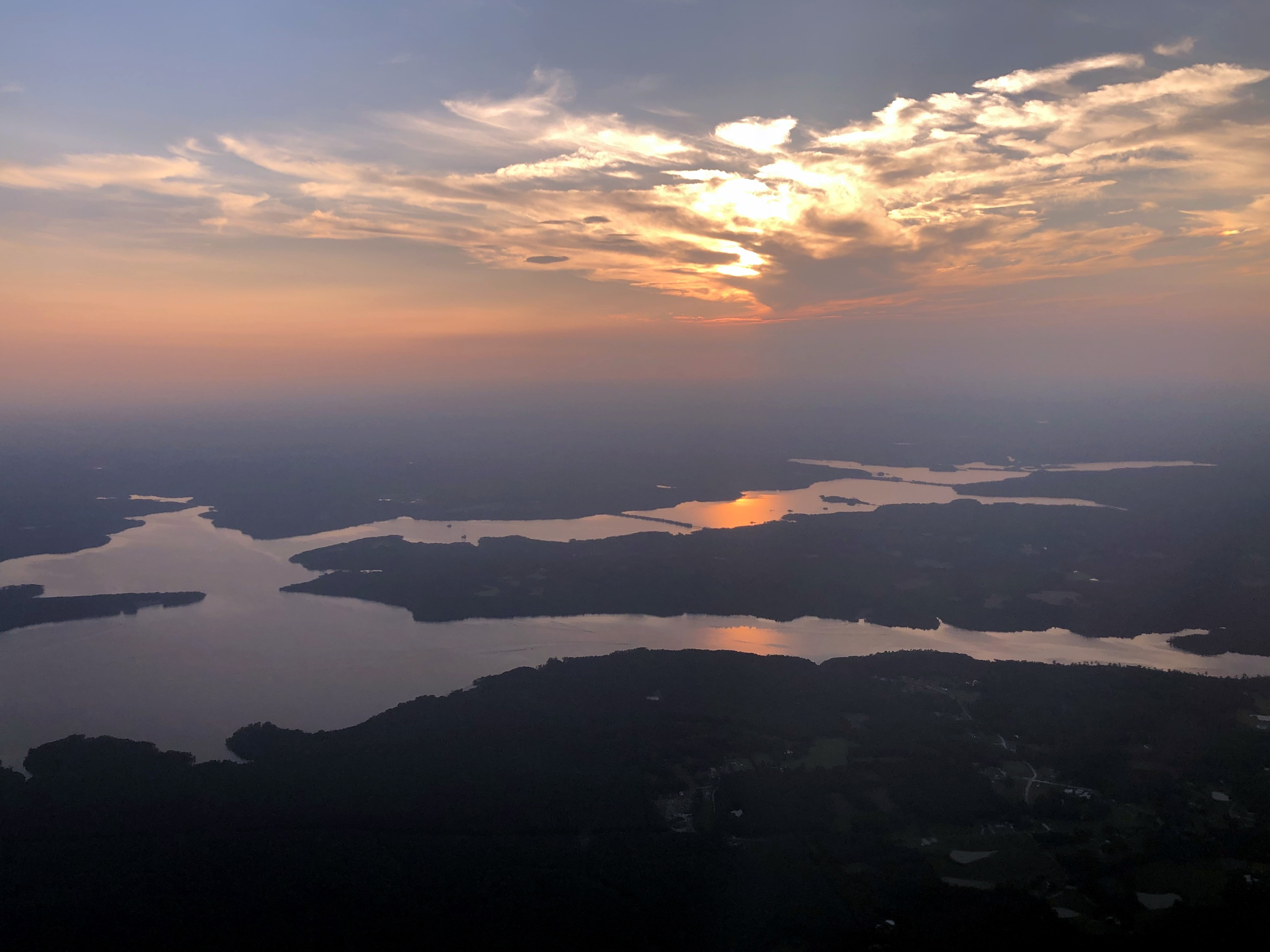

- Location within North Carolina Location within the United States
- Location: Durham / Wake / Granville counties, North Carolina, US
- Coordinates: 36°1′N 78°43′W
- Lake type: reservoir
- Primary inflows: Eno River, Flat River, Little River
- Primary outflows: Neuse River
- Basin countries: United States
- Surface area: 12,410 acres (5,000 ha)
- Shore length^{1}: 175 miles (280 km)
- Surface elevation: 251.5 feet (76.7 m)
- ^{1} Shore length is not a well-defined measure.

Falls Lake is a 12,410 acre (50 km^{2}) reservoir located in Durham, Wake, and Granville counties in North Carolina, United States. It extends 28 miles (45 km) up the Neuse River to its source at the confluence of the Eno, Little, and Flat rivers, and has a shoreline of 175 miles (280 km).

The lake is named for the Falls of the Neuse, a once whitewater section of the river that fell from the Piedmont into the lower Coastal Plain submerged during construction of the lake.

The lake provides drinking water for several of the surrounding communities, including the city of Raleigh, aids with flood control and serves as a recreation area and wildlife habitat.

Work on the dam that holds the lake began in 1978 and was completed in 1981. Prior to its construction, flooding of the Neuse River caused extensive damage to public and private properties including roadways, railroads, industrial sites, and farmlands. The U.S. Army Corps of Engineers constructed and manages the dam. Falls Dam (35°56′30″N 78°34′57″W) is an earthen structure having a top elevation of 291.5 feet (88.8 m) and an overall length of 1,915 feet (584 m). The height above the streambed is 92.5 feet (28 m).

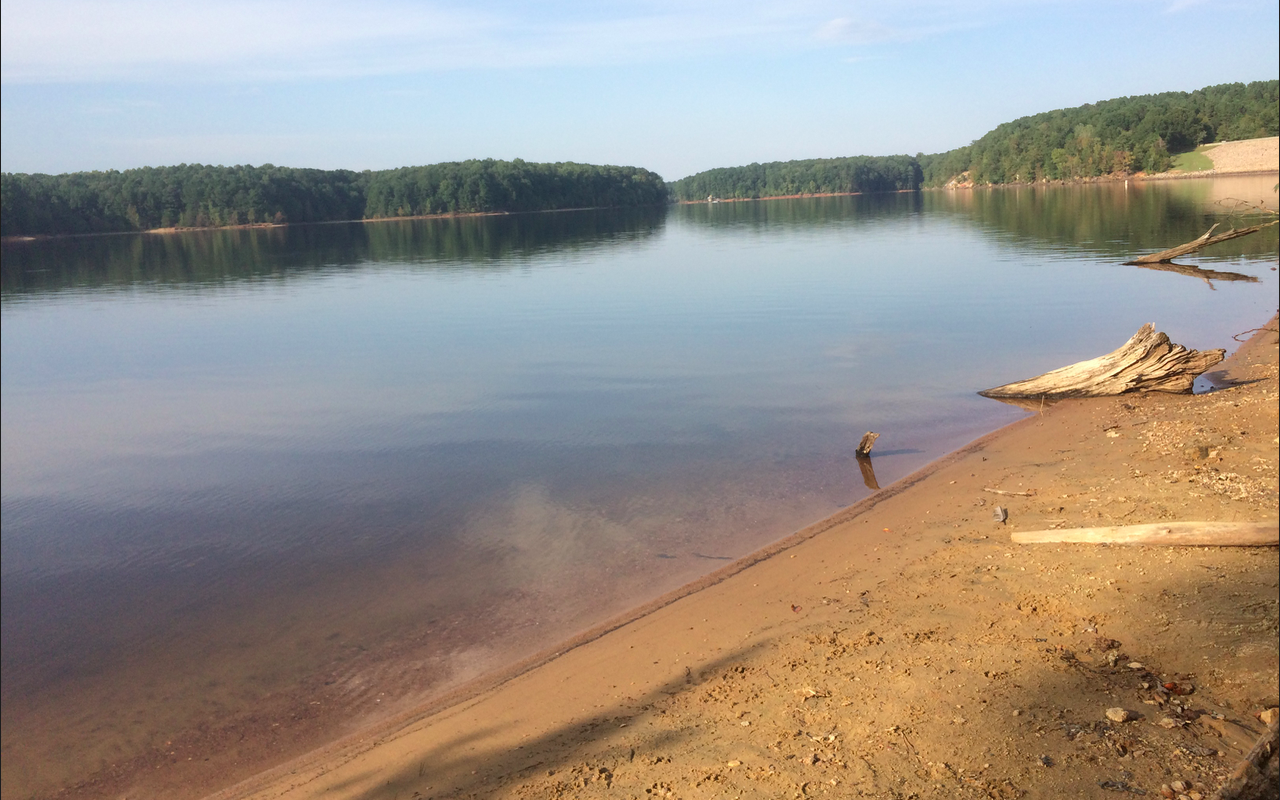
Falls Lake near the Falls Lake Dam

== See also ==
- Falls Lake State Recreation Area
