= Neuse Township, Wake County, North Carolina =

Township in Wake County, North Carolina, U.S.

Coordinates: 35.8699522°N 78.5887951°W

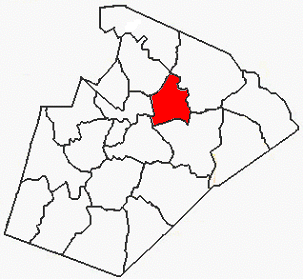

Neuse Township (also designated Township 13) is one of twenty townships within Wake County, North Carolina, United States. As of the 2010 United States census, Neuse Township had a population of 73,617, a 52.6% increase over 2000.

Neuse Township, occupying 27.5 square miles (71.2 km^{2}) in north-central Wake County, is almost completely occupied by portions of the city of Raleigh.
