= James City, North Carolina =

- Census-designated place
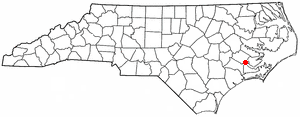
- Location of James City, North Carolina
- Coordinates: 35°03′24″N 77°00′31″W
- Country: United States
- State: North Carolina
- County: Craven

Area
  - Total: 13.81 sq mi (35.76 km^{2})
  - Land: 7.71 sq mi (19.97 km^{2})
  - Water: 6.10 sq mi (15.79 km^{2})
- Elevation: 23 ft (7.0 m)

Population (2020)
  - Total: 5,291
  - Density: 686.2/sq mi (264.93/km^{2})
- Time zone: UTC-5 (Eastern (EST))
  - Summer (DST): UTC-4 (EDT)
- FIPS code: 37-34260
- GNIS feature ID: 2402629

James City is an unincorporated area and census-designated place (CDP) in Craven County, North Carolina, United States. As of the 2020 census, James City had a population of 5,291. It is part of the New Bern, North Carolina Metropolitan Statistical Area.

== History ==
James City was developed during the American Civil War when Union forces, occupying nearby New Bern, constructed a resettlement camp for freed slaves on land belonging to Confederate Army Colonel Peter G. Evans. Originally referred to as the Trent River Settlement, by 1865 it had been renamed James City, after its founder, Union Army chaplain Horace James, superintendent of Negro affairs and agent for the Bureau of Freedmen, Refugees, and Abandoned Lands.

== Geography ==
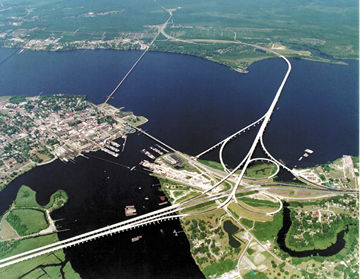
Aerial photo of New Bern (center left) and James City (center to lower right). East is up.

James City is located in central Craven County along the west bank of the tidal Neuse River. It is bordered to the north by the city of New Bern, the county seat, across the Trent River, a tributary of the Neuse. To the west are the unincorporated community of Brices Creek, and a more recently annexed portion of New Bern. Coastal Carolina Regional Airport is in the northwestern part of the CDP.

According to the United States Census Bureau, James City has a total area of 13.9 square miles (35.9 km^{2}), of which 7.6 square miles (19.7 km^{2}) is land and 6.3 square miles (16.3 km^{2}), or 45.34%, is water.

== Demographics ==
Historical population
Census	Pop.	Note	%±
2020	5,291		—
U.S. Decennial Census

=== 2020 census ===
As of the 2020 census, James City had a population of 5,291. There were 2,170 households, including 1,475 families. The median age was 45.6 years. 19.1% of residents were under the age of 18 and 23.9% of residents were 65 years of age or older. For every 100 females there were 94.8 males, and for every 100 females age 18 and over there were 90.6 males age 18 and over.

97.6% of residents lived in urban areas, while 2.4% lived in rural areas.

Of households in James City, 27.1% had children under the age of 18 living in them. Of all households, 48.3% were married-couple households, 18.5% were households with a male householder and no spouse or partner present, and 27.3% were households with a female householder and no spouse or partner present. About 29.1% of all households were made up of individuals and 15.0% had someone living alone who was 65 years of age or older.

There were 2,532 housing units, of which 14.3% were vacant. The homeowner vacancy rate was 3.9% and the rental vacancy rate was 5.9%.

James City racial composition
Race	Number	Percentage
White (non-Hispanic)	3,919	74.07%
Black or African American (non-Hispanic)	713	13.48%
Native American	8	0.15%
Asian	47	0.89%
Pacific Islander	5	0.09%
Other/Mixed	250	4.73%
Hispanic or Latino	349	6.6%

=== 2000 census ===
As of the census of 2000, there were 5,420 people, 2,184 households, and 1,530 families residing in the CDP. The population density was 651.5 inhabitants per square mile (251.5/km^{2}). There were 2,397 housing units at an average density of 288.1 per square mile (111.2/km^{2}). The racial makeup of the CDP was 78.91% White, 18.14% African American, 0.24% Native American, 0.48% Asian, 0.02% Pacific Islander, 1.03% from other races, and 1.18% from two or more races. Hispanic or Latino of any race were 1.96% of the population.

There were 2,184 households, out of which 30.9% had children under the age of 18 living with them, 54.8% were married couples living together, 12.0% had a female householder with no husband present, and 29.9% were non-families. 25.1% of all households were made up of individuals, and 8.1% had someone living alone who was 65 years of age or older. The average household size was 2.44 and the average family size was 2.90.

In the CDP, the population was spread out, with 24.6% under the age of 18, 7.9% from 18 to 24, 29.6% from 25 to 44, 23.5% from 45 to 64, and 14.4% who were 65 years of age or older. The median age was 38 years. For every 100 females, there were 94.2 males. For every 100 females age 18 and over, there were 90.0 males.

The median income for a household in the CDP was $36,490, and the median income for a family was $45,410. Males had a median income of $31,021 versus $21,859 for females. The per capita income for the CDP was $18,635. About 9.6% of families and 13.5% of the population were below the poverty line, including 22.9% of those under age 18 and 11.2% of those age 65 or over.
