= Neuse Forest, North Carolina =

- Census-designated place
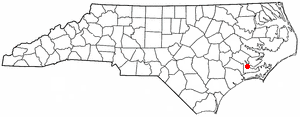
- Location of Neuse Forest, North Carolina
- Coordinates: 34°57′58″N 76°56′24″W
- Country: United States
- State: North Carolina
- County: Craven

Area
  - Total: 3.18 sq mi (8.24 km^{2})
  - Land: 3.16 sq mi (8.18 km^{2})
  - Water: 0.019 sq mi (0.05 km^{2})
- Elevation: 26 ft (7.9 m)

Population (2020)
  - Total: 2,110
  - Density: 667.7/sq mi (257.81/km^{2})
- Time zone: UTC-5 (Eastern (EST))
  - Summer (DST): UTC-4 (EDT)
- ZIP code: 28560
- Area code: 252
- FIPS code: 37-46280
- GNIS feature ID: 2403330

Neuse Forest is a census-designated place (CDP) in Craven County, North Carolina, United States. As of the 2020 census, Neuse Forest had a population of 2,110. It is part of the New Bern, North Carolina Metropolitan Statistical Area.

== Geography ==
Neuse Forest is located in southern Craven County along the south bank of the tidal Neuse River. It is bordered to the northwest by the Neuse River Recreation Area of Croatan National Forest, to the southwest by U.S. Route 70, a four-lane highway, and to the southeast by Marine Corps Air Station Cherry Point.

According to the United States Census Bureau, the Neuse Forest CDP has a total area of 3.18 square miles (8.24 km^{2}), of which 3.16 square miles (8.18 km^{2}) is land and 0.019 square miles (0.05 km^{2}), or 0.63%, is water.

== Demographics ==
Historical population
Census	Pop.	Note	%±
2020	2,110		—
U.S. Decennial Census

=== 2020 census ===
Neuse Forest racial composition
Race	Number	Percentage
White (non-Hispanic)	1,651	78.25%
Black or African American (non-Hispanic)	131	6.21%
Native American	5	0.24%
Asian	62	2.94%
Pacific Islander	3	0.14%
Other/Mixed	130	6.16%
Hispanic or Latino	128	6.07%

As of the 2020 census, Neuse Forest had a population of 2,110. The median age was 43.0 years. 23.1% of residents were under the age of 18 and 21.0% of residents were 65 years of age or older. For every 100 females there were 97.2 males, and for every 100 females age 18 and over there were 92.9 males age 18 and over.

0.0% of residents lived in urban areas, while 100.0% lived in rural areas.

There were 831 households in Neuse Forest, of which 29.5% had children under the age of 18 living in them. Of all households, 63.5% were married-couple households, 13.7% were households with a male householder and no spouse or partner present, and 19.1% were households with a female householder and no spouse or partner present. About 21.9% of all households were made up of individuals and 12.5% had someone living alone who was 65 years of age or older.

There were 885 housing units, of which 6.1% were vacant. The homeowner vacancy rate was 1.4% and the rental vacancy rate was 4.0%.

=== 2000 census ===
As of the census of 2000, there were 1,426 people, 526 households, and 460 families residing in the CDP. The population density was 481.1 inhabitants per square mile (185.8/km^{2}). There were 555 housing units at an average density of 187.3 per square mile (72.3/km^{2}). The racial makeup of the CDP was 89.97% White, 6.38% African American, 0.14% Native American, 1.75% Asian, 0.63% from other races, and 1.12% from two or more races. Hispanic or Latino of any race were 1.54% of the population.

There were 526 households, out of which 35.0% had children under the age of 18 living with them, 80.8% were married couples living together, 4.9% had a female householder with no husband present, and 12.4% were non-families. 10.1% of all households were made up of individuals, and 3.2% had someone living alone who was 65 years of age or older. The average household size was 2.71 and the average family size was 2.88.

In the CDP, the population was spread out, with 24.8% under the age of 18, 4.6% from 18 to 24, 26.9% from 25 to 44, 31.6% from 45 to 64, and 12.1% who were 65 years of age or older. The median age was 42 years. For every 100 females, there were 101.4 males. For every 100 females age 18 and over, there were 100.6 males.

The median income for a household in the CDP was $67,222, and the median income for a family was $70,284. Males had a median income of $38,889 versus $30,556 for females. The per capita income for the CDP was $29,828. None of the families and 1.1% of the population were living below the poverty line, including no under eighteens and none of those over 64.
