= Shawn Armstrong =

American baseball player (born 1990)

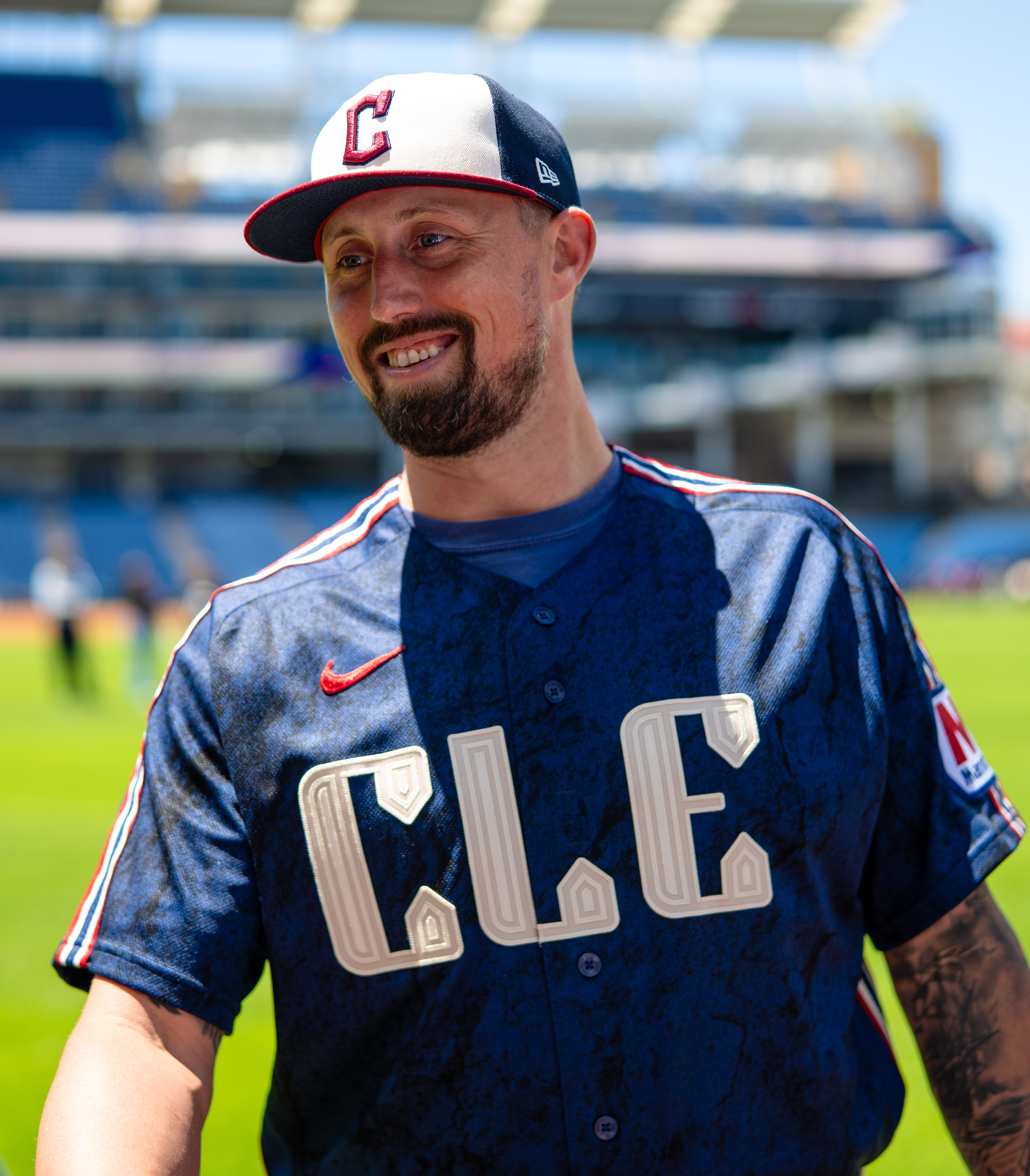
- Armstrong with the Cleveland Guardians in 2026

Free agent
- Pitcher
- Born: September 11, 1990 (age 36); New Bern, North Carolina, U.S.
- Bats: Right Throws: Right

MLB debut
- August 8, 2015, for the Cleveland Indians

MLB statistics (through 2026 season)
- Win–loss record: 17–12
- Earned run average: 3.88
- Strikeouts: 468
- Stats at Baseball Reference

Teams
- Cleveland Indians (2015–2017); Seattle Mariners (2018–2019); Baltimore Orioles (2019–2021); Tampa Bay Rays (2021); Miami Marlins (2022); Tampa Bay Rays (2022–2024); St. Louis Cardinals (2024); Chicago Cubs (2024); Texas Rangers (2025); Cleveland Guardians (2026)

Shawn Michael Armstrong (born September 11, 1990) is an American professional baseball pitcher who is a free agent. He has previously played in MLB for the Cleveland Indians, Seattle Mariners, Baltimore Orioles, Miami Marlins, Tampa Bay Rays, St. Louis Cardinals, Chicago Cubs, and Texas Rangers.

== Early life ==
Armstrong attended West Craven High School in Vanceboro, North Carolina. He was a member of the varsity baseball team for his entire high school career and participated in cross country for two seasons. The Houston Astros selected Armstrong in the 33rd round of the 2008 MLB draft, but he did not sign. He then enrolled at East Carolina University (ECU), where he played college baseball for the ECU Pirates. He missed the 2009 season after having shoulder surgery, and finished his collegiate career with a 4-3 win–loss record and a 4.45 earned run average (ERA).

== Career ==
=== Cleveland Indians ===
The Cleveland Indians selected Armstrong in the 18th round of the 2011 MLB draft. In 2012, Armstrong pitched for the Carolina Mudcats of the High-A Carolina League. He was named a Carolina League All-Star. He ended the year with a 2.06 ERA. He missed the beginning of the 2013 with an injury, and had a 4.14 ERA on the season after he returned to health. In 2014, he pitched for the Akron RubberDucks of the Double-A Eastern League. He was named an Eastern League All-Star. After the 2014 season, the Indians added Armstrong to their 40-man roster. Armstrong pitched for the Columbus Clippers of the Triple-A International League in 2015, and was named to the Triple-A All-Star Game.

Armstrong was called up to the major leagues for the first time on August 8, 2015. Armstrong made his major league debut the same night, pitching a scoreless ninth inning with two strikeouts. He finished his rookie season with a 2.25 ERA across eight appearances. In 2016, Armstrong logged a 2.53 ERA with 7 strikeouts in 10 appearances for the Indians. In 2017, he pitched in 22 games for Cleveland, recording a 4.38 ERA with 20 strikeouts in 24.2 innings pitched.

=== Seattle Mariners ===
On December 13, 2017, the Indians traded Armstrong to the Seattle Mariners for international bonus pool money. In 2018 with Seattle, Armstrong pitched to a neat 1.23 ERA with 15 strikeouts in 14.2 innings pitched. On March 18, 2019, Armstrong was placed on the disabled list with an oblique injury. Armstrong was designated for assignment on April 26 after struggling to a 14.73 ERA in 4 appearances to begin the year.

=== Baltimore Orioles ===
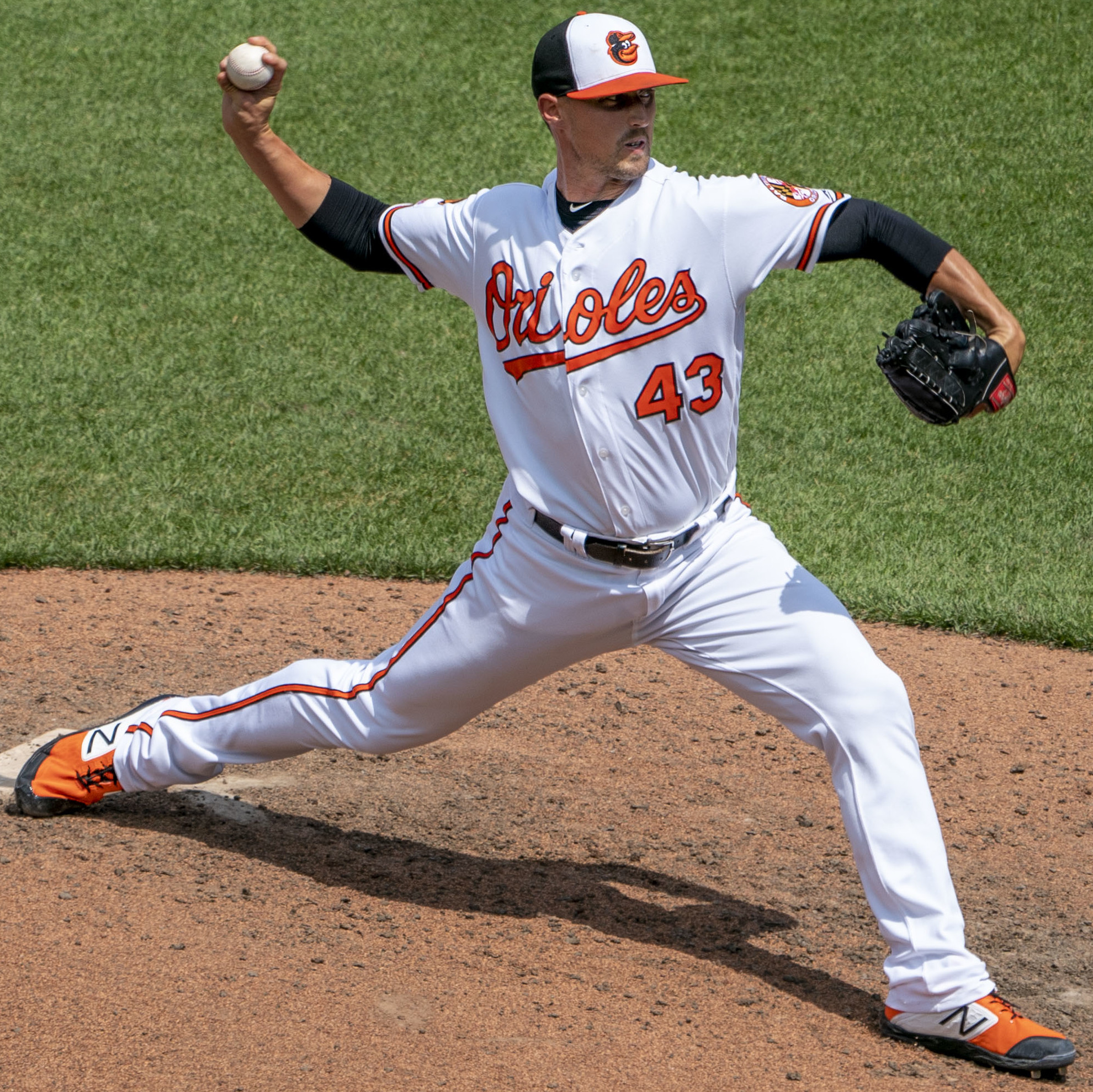
Armstrong with the Baltimore Orioles in 2019

On April 28, 2019, Armstrong was claimed off waivers by the Baltimore Orioles. Armstrong recorded a 5.13 ERA in 51 appearances for the Orioles in 2019.

In 2020, Armstrong pitched in 14 games for the Orioles, notching a 1.80 ERA and 14 strikeouts to go along with a 2–0 record over 15.0 innings pitched.

After struggling to an 8.55 ERA in 20 appearances in 2021, Armstrong was designated for assignment by the Orioles on June 4, 2021. He cleared waivers and was sent outright to the Triple–A Norfolk Tides on June 11.

=== Tampa Bay Rays ===
On July 30, 2021, Armstrong was traded to the Tampa Bay Rays in exchange for cash considerations. On August 17, the Rays selected Armstrong's contract. Armstrong made 11 appearances for the Rays, posting a 4.50 ERA with 22 strikeouts. Armstrong was designated for assignment by the Rays on September 12. On October 8, Armstrong elected free agency.

=== Miami Marlins ===
On March 13, 2022, Armstrong signed a minor league contract with the Miami Marlins. On April 7, the Marlins selected Armstrong's contract, adding him to their opening day roster. He was designated for assignment on May 2, 2022, then elected free agency two days later.

=== Tampa Bay Rays (second stint) ===
On May 10, 2022, Armstrong signed a minor league deal with the Tampa Bay Rays and was assigned to the Triple–A Durham Bulls. He was selected to the major league roster on May 31. Armstrong made 43 appearances for Tampa Bay in 2022, posting a 2–3 record and 3.60 ERA with 61 strikeouts and two saves in 55 innings pitched.

On April 17, 2023, Armstrong was placed on the 60-day injured list with a neck injury. He was activated on June 3. In 39 appearances for Tampa Bay in 2023, Armstrong recorded a 1.38 ERA with 54 strikeouts across 52 innings of work.

On January 11, 2024, Armstrong signed a one-year, $2.05 million contract extension with the Rays. In 38 games for the Rays, he compiled a 5.40 ERA with 50 strikeouts over 46 2/3 innings pitched.

=== St. Louis Cardinals ===
On July 30, 2024, the Rays traded Armstrong to the St. Louis Cardinals in exchange for Dylan Carlson. In 11 games for St. Louis, he recorded a 2.84 ERA with 12 strikeouts across 12 2/3 innings pitched. Armstrong was designated for assignment by the Cardinals on August 27.

=== Chicago Cubs ===
On August 30, 2024, Armstrong was claimed off waivers by the Chicago Cubs. In 8 games for Chicago, he logged a 4.91 ERA with 4 strikeouts over 7 1/3 innings pitched. Armstrong was designated for assignment by the Cubs on September 20. He was released by the team on September 24.

=== Texas Rangers ===
On December 23, 2024, Armstrong signed a one–year contract with the Texas Rangers. Armstrong made 71 appearances (two starts) for the Rangers in 2025, compiling a 4-3 record and 2.31 ERA with 74 strikeouts and nine saves over 74 innings of work.

=== Cleveland Guardians ===
On December 20, 2025, Armstrong signed a one-year, $5.5 million contract with the Cleveland Guardians. On July 24, 2026, in a game against the Tampa Bay Rays, Armstrong had to be helped off of the field after suffering a 'significant' calf injury. He was transferred to the 60–day injured list on August 3. Armstrong was activated from the injured list on September 23. On October 30, the Guardians declined their mutual option on him, making him a free agent.
