= Dr. Earl S. Sloan House =

Historic house in North Carolina, United States

- U.S. National Register of Historic Places
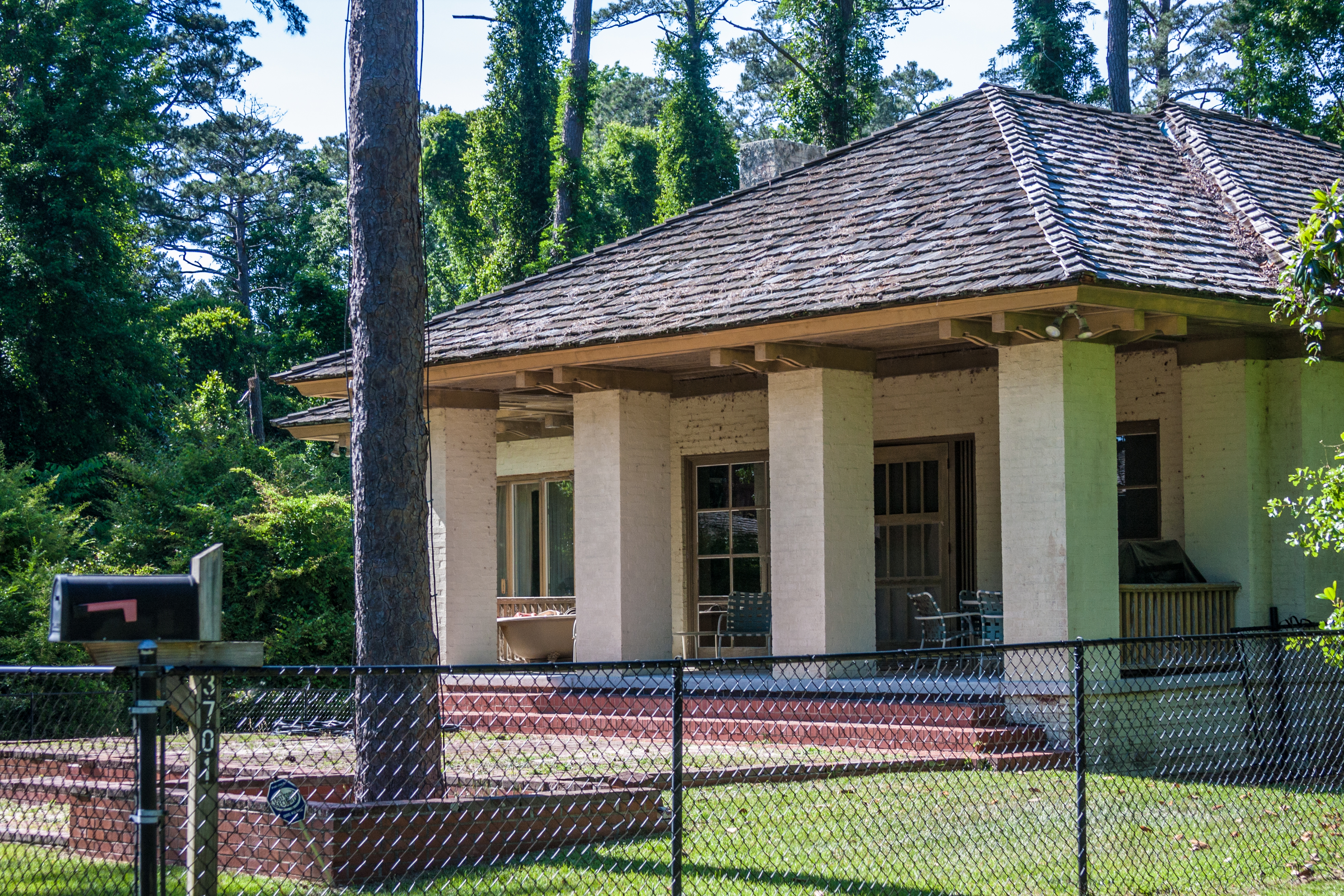
- Dr. Earl S. Sloan House, May 2013

- Location within North Carolina Location within the United States
- Location: 3701 Country Club Rd., Trent Woods, North Carolina
- Coordinates: 35°4′54″N 77°4′58″W
- Area: 0.8 acres (0.32 ha)
- Built: 1914
- Architect: Smallwood, Robert F.
- Architectural style: Colonial Revival, Tudor Revival, Mediterranean
- NRHP reference No.: 86001627
- Added to NRHP: August 14, 1986

Dr. Earl S. Sloan House is a historic home located at Trent Woods, Craven County, North Carolina. It was built in 1914, and is a 2 1/2-story brick dwelling, consisting of a main block and flanking pavilions under low, hipped slate roofs. It is a Colonial Revival style residence with Tudor Revival and Mediterranean style design influences.

It was listed on the National Register of Historic Places in 1986.
