= Brices Creek, North Carolina =

- Census-designated place
- Location within the state of North Carolina
- Coordinates: 35°03′02″N 77°05′04″W
- Country: United States
- State: North Carolina
- County: Craven

Area
  - Total: 8.35 sq mi (21.62 km^{2})
  - Land: 7.85 sq mi (20.33 km^{2})
  - Water: 0.50 sq mi (1.29 km^{2})
- Elevation: 26 ft (7.9 m)

Population (2020)
  - Total: 3,542
  - Density: 451.2/sq mi (174.21/km^{2})
- Time zone: UTC-5 (Eastern (EST))
  - Summer (DST): UTC-4 (EDT)
- FIPS code: 37-07765
- GNIS feature ID: 2402714

Brices Creek is an unincorporated area and census-designated place (CDP) in Craven County, North Carolina, United States. As of the 2020 census, Brices Creek had a population of 3,542. It is part of the New Bern, North Carolina Metropolitan Statistical Area.

== Geography ==
Brices Creek is located in central Craven County. It is bordered to the north by the tidal Trent River, across which is the town of Trent Woods. New Bern, the county seat, is 5 miles (8 km) to the northeast. The CDP is bordered on the west by Croatan National Forest in Jones County. The waterway of Brices Creek flows across the eastern part of the CDP, into the Trent River.

According to the United States Census Bureau, the CDP has a total area of 8.3 square miles (21.6 km^{2}), of which 7.8 square miles (20.3 km^{2}) is land and 0.50 square miles (1.3 km^{2}), or 5.90%, is water.

== Demographics ==
Historical population
Census	Pop.	Note	%±
2020	3,542		—
U.S. Decennial Census

=== 2020 census ===
Brices Creek racial composition
Race	Number	Percentage
White (non-Hispanic)	2,941	83.03%
Black or African American (non-Hispanic)	268	7.57%
Native American	5	0.14%
Asian	48	1.36%
Pacific Islander	1	0.03%
Other/Mixed	163	4.6%
Hispanic or Latino	116	3.27%

As of the 2020 census, Brices Creek had a population of 3,542. The median age was 45.5 years. 22.4% of residents were under the age of 18 and 22.2% of residents were 65 years of age or older. For every 100 females, there were 91.5 males, and for every 100 females age 18 and over, there were 93.0 males.

80.6% of residents lived in urban areas, while 19.4% lived in rural areas.

There were 1,300 households in Brices Creek, of which 31.1% had children under the age of 18 living in them. Of all households, 72.9% were married-couple households, 9.5% were households with a male householder and no spouse or partner present, and 14.2% were households with a female householder and no spouse or partner present. About 14.0% of all households were made up of individuals, and 6.4% had someone living alone who was 65 years of age or older.

There were 1,370 housing units, of which 5.1% were vacant. The homeowner vacancy rate was 1.4% and the rental vacancy rate was 18.1%.

=== 2010 census ===
The 2010 census reported that there were 3,073 a 49%White alone - 2,692 (87.6%), Black alone - 261 (8.5%), Two or more races 51 (1.7%), Hispanic - 46 (1.5%, Asian alone - 22 (0.7%), American Indian alone - 1 (0.03%.

Population in 2010: 3,073. Population change since 2000: +49.2%, Males: 1,506 (49.0%) Females: 1,567 (51.0%), Median resident age: 41.9 years North Carolina median age: 41.9 years Estimated median household income in 2009: $72,457 (it was $61,182 in 2000) Brices Creek: $72,457

Estimated median house or condo value in 2009: $280,510 (it was $142,600 in 2000) Brices Creek:

Mean prices in 2009: All housing units: $251,342; Detached houses: $259,708; Mobile homes: $47,664

Median gross rent in 2009: $1,293.

=== 2000 census ===
In 2000, there were 2,060 people, 765 households, and 631 families residing in the CDP. The population density was 259.6 inhabitants per square mile (100.2/km^{2}). There were 841 housing units at an average density of 106.0 per square mile (40.9/km^{2}). The racial makeup of the CDP was 87.82% White, 11.31% African American, 0.10% Native American, 0.24% Asian, and 0.53% from two or more races. Hispanic or Latino of any race were 0.73% of the population.

There were 765 households, out of which 37.9% had children under the age of 18 living with them, 77.4% were married couples living together, 3.5% had a female householder with no husband present, and 17.4% were non-families. 14.8% of all households were made up of individuals, and 4.6% had someone living alone who was 65 years of age or older. The average household size was 2.68 and the average family size was 2.98.

In the CDP, the population was spread out, with 26.1% under the age of 18, 4.7% from 18 to 24, 27.8% from 25 to 44, 31.3% from 45 to 64, and 10.1% who were 65 years of age or older. The median age was 41 years. For every 100 females, there were 99.6 males. For every 100 females age 18 and over, there were 99.2 males.

The median income for a household in the CDP was $61,182, and the median income for a family was $65,833. Males had a median income of $51,347 versus $26,554 for females. The per capita income for the CDP was $22,115. None of the families and 0.9% of the population were living below the poverty line, including no under eighteens and 10.0% of those over 64.
