= Mildred Inez Bailey =

United States Army general

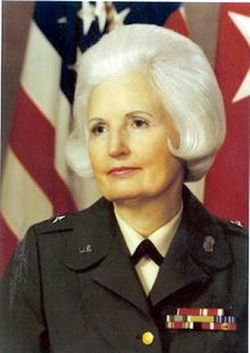
- Born: Mildred Inez Caroon; April 18, 1919; Fort Barnwell, North Carolina, US
- Died: July 18, 2009 (aged 90); Alexandria, Virginia, US
- Burial place: Arlington National Cemetery
- Spouse: Roy Carson Bailey (m. 1943; died 1966)
- Military career
- Allegiance: United States
- Branch: United States Army
- Service years: 1942–1975
- Rank: Brigadier general
- Commands: Women's Army Corps
- Conflicts: World War II
- Awards: Army Distinguished Service Medal; Legion of Merit

Mildred Inez Bailey (née Caroon; April 18, 1919 – July 18, 2009) was a United States Army officer, who served as the eighth director of the Women's Army Corps from August 1971 until July 1975. She was the third woman in United States Army to reach the rank of brigadier general.

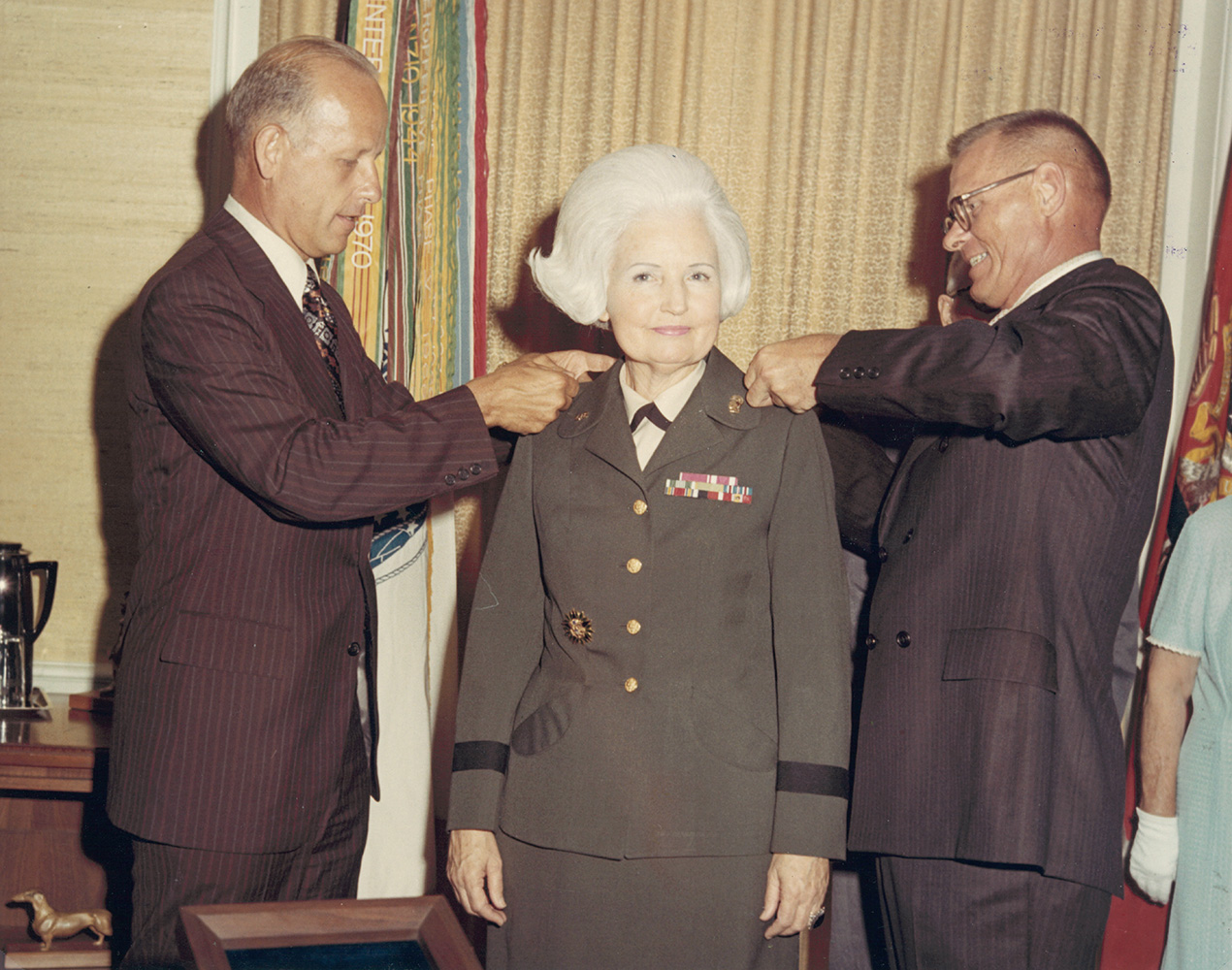
Secretary of the Army Robert F. Froehlke, assisted by Colonel Keith S. Lane, pins stars on the WAC Director, Mildred I. C. Bailey, August 2, 1971.

== Early life ==
Mildred Inez Caroon was born in Fort Barnwell, North Carolina, and raised in nearby Kinston. After graduating from high school, she enrolled in Flora MacDonald College in Red Springs, North Carolina. She transferred to the Woman's College of the University of North Carolina (now the University of North Carolina at Greensboro) in her sophomore year and graduated in 1940. After graduation, she attended summer school at the University of North Carolina at Chapel Hill. Bailey went on to teach French in Taylorsville, North Carolina.

== Military career ==
Bailey joined the Women's Army Auxiliary Corps (later the Women's Army Corps) at Fort Bragg, North Carolina, in the summer of 1942, and was sent to Officer Training School at Fort Des Moines, Iowa, where she was a member of the third class of WAACs.

Bailey was assigned to the United States Army Air Corps and stationed in Daytona Beach, Florida, until mid-1943, when the company she commanded was transferred to George Field Army Air Base in Illinois. Bailey was then sent to Walnut Ridge, Arkansas, for a short time before moving to Craig Air Force Base, Alabama, where she taught English to members of the French Air Force until the end of the war in 1945.

Bailey remained in the army after World War II and was sent to Miami, Florida, where she served as vocational guidance and counselor officer for veterans. In 1949, she was transferred to Stuttgart, Germany, with an intelligence assignment. She was then sent to Munich to command a WAC attachment at the 98th General Hospital.

In 1953, Bailey returned stateside to Washington, D.C., where she worked in the intelligence branch of the Military District of Washington headquarters. In 1957, she graduated from Strategic Intelligence School, and then reported to Fort McPherson, Georgia, where she served as the head of recruiting for the Southeastern United States for three years. In 1961, she was put in charge of the WAC detachment at Fort Myer, Virginia, the largest detachment in the United States. While there, she worked on building a woman's exhibit for a traveling set of exhibits that would inform the country about the army. Bailey worked from 1963 to 1968 traveling with the tour and expanding the women's history presentation. Upon returning to Washington, she worked as a liaison officer for the Senate. In 1970, she made deputy commander at the training center in Fort McClellan, Alabama.

On August 2, 1971 Bailey became the director of the Women's Army Corps and was promoted to brigadier general. As director, Bailey is remembered for designing the army's female drill sergeant hat in 1972. Her design was taken from the Australian bush hat, and was beige in color. In 1983, the color was changed to green with the style remaining unchanged.

Bailey retired from the army in July 1975.

== Personal life ==
In 1943, she married Marine Sergeant Major Roy Carson Bailey. They remained married until he died in a car accident in 1966.

Bailey died at the Knollwood military retirement facility in Alexandria, Virginia, on July 18, 2009. She had Alzheimer's disease. She is buried in Arlington National Cemetery.

== Decorations ==

1st Row	Army Distinguished Service Medal	Legion of Merit	Meritorious Service Medal
2nd Row	Army Commendation Medal	American Defense Service Medal	American Campaign Medal
3rd Row	World War II Victory Medal	Army of Occupation Medal	National Defense Service Medal w/ Oak Leaf Cluster
