= Pond Pine Wilderness =

Wilderness Area in North Carolina, USA

- IUCN category Ib (wilderness area)
- Location within the United States
- Location: Craven and Jones County Counties, North Carolina, USA
- Nearest city: Havelock, North Carolina
- Coordinates: 34°50′11″N 077°03′31″W
- Area: 1,693 acres (7 km^{2})
- Designation: 1984
- Designated: Wilderness Area
- Named for: Pinus serotina
- Governing body: United States Forest Service

Pond Pine Wilderness is a federally designated wilderness area in the Croatan National Forest in eastern North Carolina. Designated in 1984, it is the smallest of North Carolina's 11 federal wilderness areas. It covers 1682 acres (7 km^{2}) of land south of Great Lake, a lake in the national forest. The wilderness area itself is a vast, acidic pocosin wetland, lacking in campsites, trails, or development.

The soil in the region is classified as muck, with a very high concentration of organic matter. The muck is underlain at an average depth of 40 inches by fine sand. Peat is also present in the area. There is a low oxygen concentration in the soil and deficiencies of nutrients like phosphorus and calcium, due to poor drainage rates.

Flora in the wilderness include the pond pine, the namesake tree of the wilderness area. Thick shrubs and vines like fetterbush, switch cane, and chain fern choke the forest floor, resulting in the ecosystem being dependent on periodic wildfires to clear out overgrown vegetation, allowing pond pine pinecones to spread their seeds. Human intervention has resulted in a decreased frequency of wildfires; consequently, the wilderness area has become hard for humans to traverse.

Ground fauna in the wilderness include white-tailed deer, black bear, alligators, cottonmouth moccasins, and southern flying squirrels. Birds like wood ducks, red-cockaded woodpeckers, bald eagles, and wild turkeys are present in the wilderness area and the larger national forest.

== See also ==
- List of U.S. Wilderness Areas
- Wilderness Act
