= Fairfield Harbour, North Carolina =

- Census-designated place
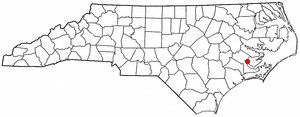
- Location of Fairfield Harbour, North Carolina
- Coordinates: 35°04′06″N 76°57′26″W
- Country: United States
- State: North Carolina
- County: Craven

Area
  - Total: 4.66 sq mi (12.08 km^{2})
  - Land: 2.88 sq mi (7.46 km^{2})
  - Water: 1.79 sq mi (4.63 km^{2})
- Elevation: 10 ft (3.0 m)

Population (2020)
  - Total: 2,767
  - Density: 961.3/sq mi (371.15/km^{2})
- Time zone: UTC-5 (Eastern (EST))
  - Summer (DST): UTC-4 (EDT)
- FIPS code: 37-22305
- GNIS feature ID: 2402469

Fairfield Harbour is an unincorporated community and census-designated place (CDP) in Craven County, North Carolina, United States. As of the 2020 census, Fairfield Harbour had a population of 2,767. It is part of the New Bern, North Carolina Metropolitan Statistical Area.

== Geography ==
Fairfield Harbour is located in east-central Craven County in reclaimed marshland bordered by the Neuse River to the southwest and Upper Broad Creek to the east. Via Broad Creek Road and U.S. Route 17, it is 11 miles (18 km) north and west to the center of New Bern, the county seat.

According to the United States Census Bureau, Fairfield Harbour has a total area of 4.1 square miles (10.7 km^{2}), of which 2.9 square miles (7.5 km^{2}) is land and 1.2 square miles (3.2 km^{2}), or 30.22%, is water.

== Demographics ==
Historical population
Census	Pop.	Note	%±
2000	1,983		—
2010	2,952		48.9%
2020	2,767		−6.3%
U.S. Decennial Census

=== 2020 census ===
As of the 2020 census, Fairfield Harbour had a population of 2,767. The median age was 65.9 years. 8.3% of residents were under the age of 18 and 53.0% of residents were 65 years of age or older. For every 100 females there were 95.5 males, and for every 100 females age 18 and over there were 95.7 males age 18 and over.

0.0% of residents lived in urban areas, while 100.0% lived in rural areas.

There were 1,382 households in Fairfield Harbour, including 985 families. Of all households, 10.1% had children under the age of 18 living in them, 63.2% were married-couple households, 12.5% were households with a male householder and no spouse or partner present, and 19.1% were households with a female householder and no spouse or partner present. About 24.1% of all households were made up of individuals and 16.4% had someone living alone who was 65 years of age or older.

There were 1,744 housing units, of which 20.8% were vacant. The homeowner vacancy rate was 4.7% and the rental vacancy rate was 16.5%.

Fairfield Harbour racial composition
Race	Number	Percentage
White (non-Hispanic)	2,428	87.75%
Black or African American (non-Hispanic)	128	4.63%
Native American	6	0.22%
Asian	28	1.01%
Pacific Islander	1	0.04%
Other/Mixed	90	3.25%
Hispanic or Latino	86	3.11%

=== 2000 census ===
As of the census of 2000, there were 1,983 people, 999 households, and 773 families residing in the CDP. The population density was 685.1 inhabitants per square mile (264.5/km^{2}). There were 1,248 housing units at an average density of 431.2 per square mile (166.5/km^{2}). The racial makeup of the CDP was 96.77% White, 2.37% African American, 0.10% Native American, 0.40% Asian, 0.10% from other races, and 0.25% from two or more races. Hispanic or Latino of any race were 0.40% of the population.

There were 999 households, out of which 6.4% had children under the age of 18 living with them, 74.6% were married couples living together, 1.9% had a female householder with no husband present, and 22.6% were non-families. 19.9% of all households were made up of individuals, and 15.6% had someone living alone who was 65 years of age or older. The average household size was 1.98 and the average family size was 2.23.

In the CDP, the population was spread out, with 6.2% under the age of 18, 1.9% from 18 to 24, 8.5% from 25 to 44, 31.1% from 45 to 64, and 52.3% who were 65 years of age or older. The median age was 66 years. For every 100 females, there were 96.5 males. For every 100 females age 18 and over, there were 95.0 males.

The median income for a household in the CDP was $51,435, and the median income for a family was $57,853. Males had a median income of $33,462 versus $19,954 for females. The per capita income for the CDP was $27,368. About 1.3% of families and 3.6% of the population were below the poverty line, including 10.8% of those under age 18 and 1.6% of those age 65 or over.
