= New Bern micropolitan area =

Metropolitan Statistical Area in North Carolina, United States

New Bern Metropolitan area
- Metropolitan Statistical Area
- Tryon Palace by John Hawks (rebuilt 1959)
Map of New Bern–Morehead City, NC CSA
New Bern µSA
City of New Bern
Morehead City µSA
Morehead City
- Country: United States
- State: North Carolina
- Largest city: New Bern
- Other cities: Morehead City
- Time zone: UTC-5 (EST)
  - Summer (DST): UTC-4 (EDT)

The New Bern metropolitan statistical area, as defined by the United States Census Bureau, is an area consisting of three counties in the Inner Banks region of eastern North Carolina, anchored by the city of New Bern. The designation of the area was changed from Micropolitan to Metropolitan in 2013.

As of the 2000 census, the μSA had a population of 114,751 (though a July 1, 2009, estimate placed the population at 121,022).

== Counties ==
- Craven
- Jones
- Pamlico

== Communities ==
- Places with more than 20,000 inhabitants
  - Havelock
  - New Bern (principal city)
- Places with 5,000 to 10,000 inhabitants
  - James City (census-designated place)
- Places with 1,000 to 5,000 inhabitants
  - Brices Creek (census-designated place)
  - Bayboro
  - Fairfield Harbour (census-designated place)
  - Maysville
  - Neuse Forest (census-designated place)
  - River Bend
  - Trent Woods
- Places with 500 to 1,000 inhabitants
  - Alliance
  - Grantsboro
  - Oriental
  - Vanceboro
- Places with less than 500 inhabitants
  - Craeberne Forrest

== Demographics ==
As of the census of 2000, there were 114,751 people, 43,821 households, and 31,724 families residing within the MSA. The racial makeup of the MSA was 69.49% White, 26.03% African American, 0.43% Native American, 0.85% Asian, 0.05% Pacific Islander, 1.64% from other races, and 1.51% from two or more races. Hispanic or Latino of any race were 3.60% of the population.

The median income for a household in the MSA was $33,644, and the median income for a family was $39,804. Males had a median income of $29,544 versus $20,764 for females. The per capita income for the MSA was $17,448.

== See also ==
- North Carolina statistical areas
