= Alliance, North Carolina =

- Town
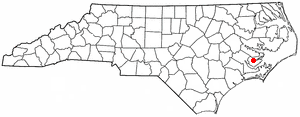
- Location of Alliance, North Carolina
- Coordinates: 35°08′37″N 76°48′30″W
- Country: United States
- State: North Carolina
- County: Pamlico

Area
  - Total: 2.08 sq mi (5.40 km^{2})
  - Land: 2.08 sq mi (5.40 km^{2})
  - Water: 0 sq mi (0.00 km^{2})
- Elevation: 0 ft (0 m)

Population (2020)
  - Total: 733
  - Density: 351.4/sq mi (135.66/km^{2})
- Time zone: UTC-5 (Eastern (EST))
  - Summer (DST): UTC-4 (EDT)
- ZIP code: 28509
- Area code: 252
- FIPS code: 37-01000
- GNIS feature ID: 2405137

Alliance is a town in Pamlico County, North Carolina, United States. Its name is derived from the Farmers Alliance Movement from around 1874, two years after Pamlico was founded. Alliance was incorporated in 1965. The majority of land in Alliance is farmland. The population was 733 at the 2020 census. It is part of the New Bern, North Carolina Micropolitan Statistical Area.

== Geography ==
According to the United States Census Bureau, the town has a total area of 2.0 square miles (5.2 km^{2}), all land.

== Demographics ==
Historical population
Census	Pop.	Note	%±
1970	577		—
1980	616		6.8%
1990	583		−5.4%
2000	781		34.0%
2010	776		−0.6%
2020	733		−5.5%
2022 (est.)	731	▼	−0.3%
U.S. Decennial Census

=== 2020 census ===
Alliance racial composition
Race	Number	Percentage
White (non-Hispanic)	556	75.85%
Black or African American (non-Hispanic)	123	16.78%
Native American	1	0.14%
Asian	5	0.68%
Pacific Islander	1	0.14%
Other/Mixed	19	2.59%
Hispanic or Latino	28	3.82%

As of the 2020 United States census, there were 733 people, 340 households, and 216 families residing in the town.

=== 2000 census ===
As of the census of 2000, there were 781 people, 288 households, and 201 families residing in the town. The population density was 389.5 inhabitants per square mile (150.4/km^{2}). There were 304 housing units at an average density of 151.6 per square mile (58.5/km^{2}). The racial makeup of the town was 79.64% White, 17.67% African American, 1.15% Native American, 0.51% Asian, 0.26% from other races, and 0.77% from two or more races. Hispanic or Latino people of any race were 0.77% of the population.

There were 288 households, out of which 26.4% had children under the age of 18 living with them, 55.6% were married couples living together, 10.8% had a female householder with no husband present, and 30.2% were non-families. 27.1% of all households were made up of individuals, and 11.1% had someone living alone who was 65 years of age or older. The average household size was 2.40 and the average family size was 2.93.

In the town, the population was spread out, with 22.5% under the age of 18, 5.5% from 18 to 24, 24.5% from 25 to 44, 22.8% from 45 to 64, and 24.7% who were 65 years of age or older. The median age was 43 years. For every 100 females, there were 83.3 males. For every 100 females age 18 and over, there were 77.4 males.

The median income for a household in the town was $26,719, and the median income for a family was $35,250. Males had a median income of $33,125 versus $22,438 for females. The per capita income for the town was $15,951. About 12.1% of families and 17.3% of the population were below the poverty line, including 28.4% of those under age 18 and 16.8% of those age 65 or over.
