= Pocosin Wilderness =

Wilderness area in North Carolina, United States

- IUCN category Ib (wilderness area)
- Location within the United States
- Location: Carteret and Craven Counties, North Carolina, USA
- Nearest city: Havelock, North Carolina
- Coordinates: 34°47′18″N 077°01′01″W
- Area: 11,801 acres (48 km^{2})
- Designation: 1984
- Designated: Wilderness Area
- Governing body: United States Forest Service

Pocosin Wilderness was designated in 1984, and it covers 11,801 acres (48 km^{2}) in the Croatan National Forest in eastern North Carolina. The Wilderness Area is a vast wetland, and it lacks trails and campsites. Travel through this wilderness is difficult.

== See also ==
- List of U.S. Wilderness Areas
- Wilderness Act
