= Neusiok Trail =

Hiking trail in North Carolina, United States

Coordinates: 34°50′01″N 76°47′10″W

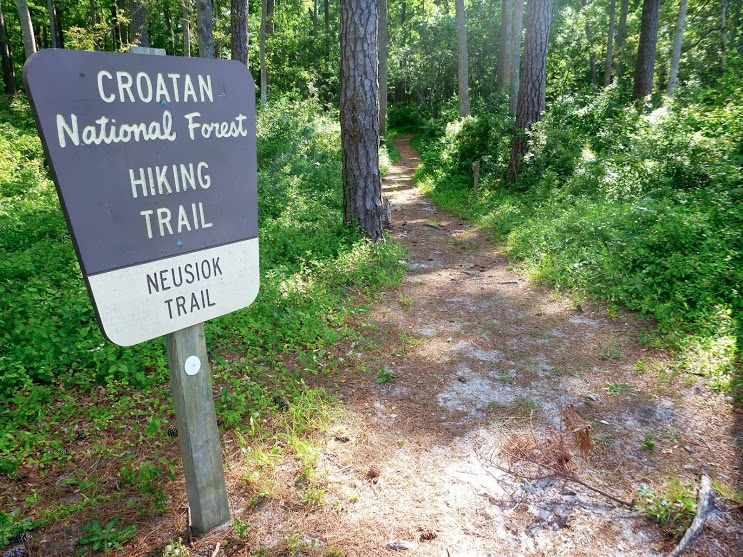
- A sign indicating the start of the trail near the Neuse River.
- Length: 20.4 miles (32.8 km)
- Location: North Carolina, United States
- Designation: Mountains-to-Sea Trail; National Recreation Trail
- Trailheads: Pine Cliff Picnic Area; Oyster Point Campground
- Use: Hiking
- Difficulty: Easy
- Season: Year-round
- Months: October — May (recommended)
- Hazards: American alligator American black bear Biting flies Chiggers; Diarrhea from water Limited water Mosquitos; Poison ivy Severe weather Tick-borne diseases Venomous snakes Yellowjackets
- Surface: Natural, sand, boardwalk
- Website: http://www.neusioktrail.org/

The Neusiok Trail /ˈnjuːsiɒk/ is a 20.4-mile (32.8 km) hiking trail located in the Croatan National Forest in Carteret County, North Carolina. The trail traverses the forest from a sandy beach on the Neuse River to a salt marsh on the Newport River, and along the way, it crosses cypress swamps, hardwood ridges, longleaf-pine savannah and pocosin—shrubby bogs The entire Neusiok is part of the almost 1,200 mile Mountains-to-Sea Trail (MST) which spans North Carolina, and the MST in the Croatan is a designated National Recreation Trail.

== History ==
Neusiok is name given to this area it by local Native Americans. These were either Algonquian or Iroquois. The name Neusiok was first recorded in English in 1584 by the Amadas–Barlowe expedition that preceded the Roanoke Colony. Neusiok is also the namesake of the nearby Neuse River.

The Neusiok trail was created in 1971 by the Carteret County Wildlife Club. The group bushwacked and blazed new trail for five years to build the Neusiok Trail in cooperation with the U.S. Forest Service. The club continues to help with trail improvements.

The trail is the longest continuous hiking trail in Eastern North Carolina other than the MST which links together many pre-existing hiking trails (including the Neusiok) together. The Neusiok was included in the MST shortly after its creation by the North Carolina General Assembly on August 2, 2000.

== Hiking the trail ==
Hiking is best from October through March when the brush is thinnest and insects and snakes are sparse. The trail crosses several roads, so the trail can be shortened to suit a hiker's tastes. The trail crosses many wet areas, and despite a number of bridges and boardwalks, hikers may still need to wiktionary:wade through water. The trail can be hiked in one day, in about 7–10 hours, depending on the hiker's pace and conditioning. Wear comfortable shoes and clothing. Take at least two liters of water and snacks. Carry a rain jacket.

=== Navigation ===
The trail is marked by rectangular aluminum tags that are undamaged by regular prescribed burning. The trail is also marked in places with Mountains-to-Sea Trail signs, as well as the MST's white, circle blazes.

=== Lodging and camping ===
Hikers may camp anywhere along the trail; however, three trail shelters offer a dry refuge:

- Copperhead Landing is about halfway between the Pine Cliff Picnic Area and NC 306. The area around the shelter is small and densely wooded. A small area for ground camping is located about 50 feet from the existing shelter, but there are no good spaces for hammock camping.
- Dogwood Camp is less than a mile south of NC 101. This site is very large and perfect for all types of camping. There are poles in the ground set up to accommodate up to 5 hammocks, when poles are shared, as well as sturdy trees and cleared ground spaces. There are around 5 cleared, flat areas that would be perfect tent camping sites.
- Blackjack Lodge is about one mile north of Mill Creek Road.

Each of the three-sided shelters has a fire grill and accommodates about three people. No drinking water is available along the trail. The shelters used to have water pumps, but they have since been removed and there is no word on replacing them.

The Oyster Point Campground is the southern trail-head for the Neusiok, and it is situated on the banks of the Newport River. The year-round campground is nestled under tall loblolly pines, and it features 15 sites and two vault toilets. Each site has a picnic table, fire grill, parking spur, tent pad, and lantern post. Oyster Point also has a shallow water boat ramp which provides a launching point for boaters and anglers to access the Intracoastal Waterway.

Camping is not permitted at the Pine Cliff Picnic Area, the Neusiok's northern trail-head.

=== Hazards ===
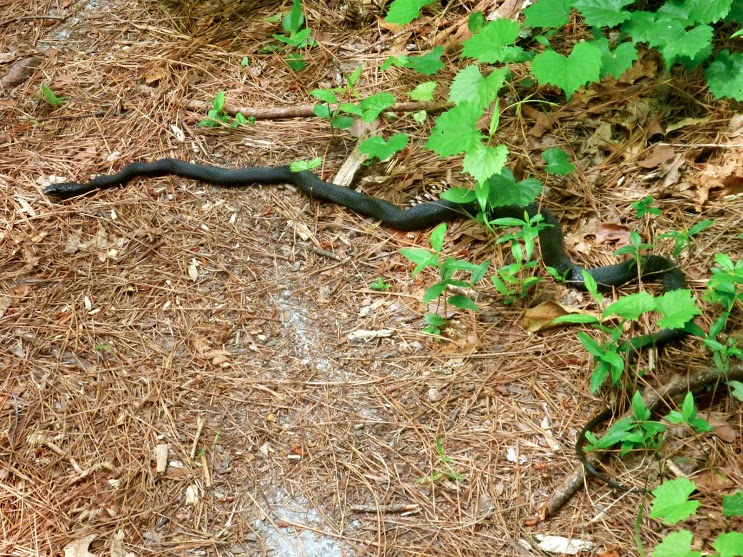
A black snake on the Neusiok Trail.

Hunters sometimes use the Neusiok to access more remote hunting grounds, so during hunting season, October through December, hikers are recommended to wear a bright orange hat or vest. Hunting is prohibited within 150 yds of recreation areas and campsites.

The trail passes through the habitats of the American alligator and the American black bear. Venomous snakes, copperheads, cottonmouths, timber (canebrake) and pygmy rattlesnakes, live in Croatan National Forest. Hikers are recommended to look before placing their hands or feet in thick brush. Mosquitoes and ticks are present, especially during the summer, and may carry diseases. Lyme disease (tick-borne) has been reported in several nearby counties, but not within the Croatan National Forest.
