= Craven County, North Carolina =

County in North Carolina, United States

- County
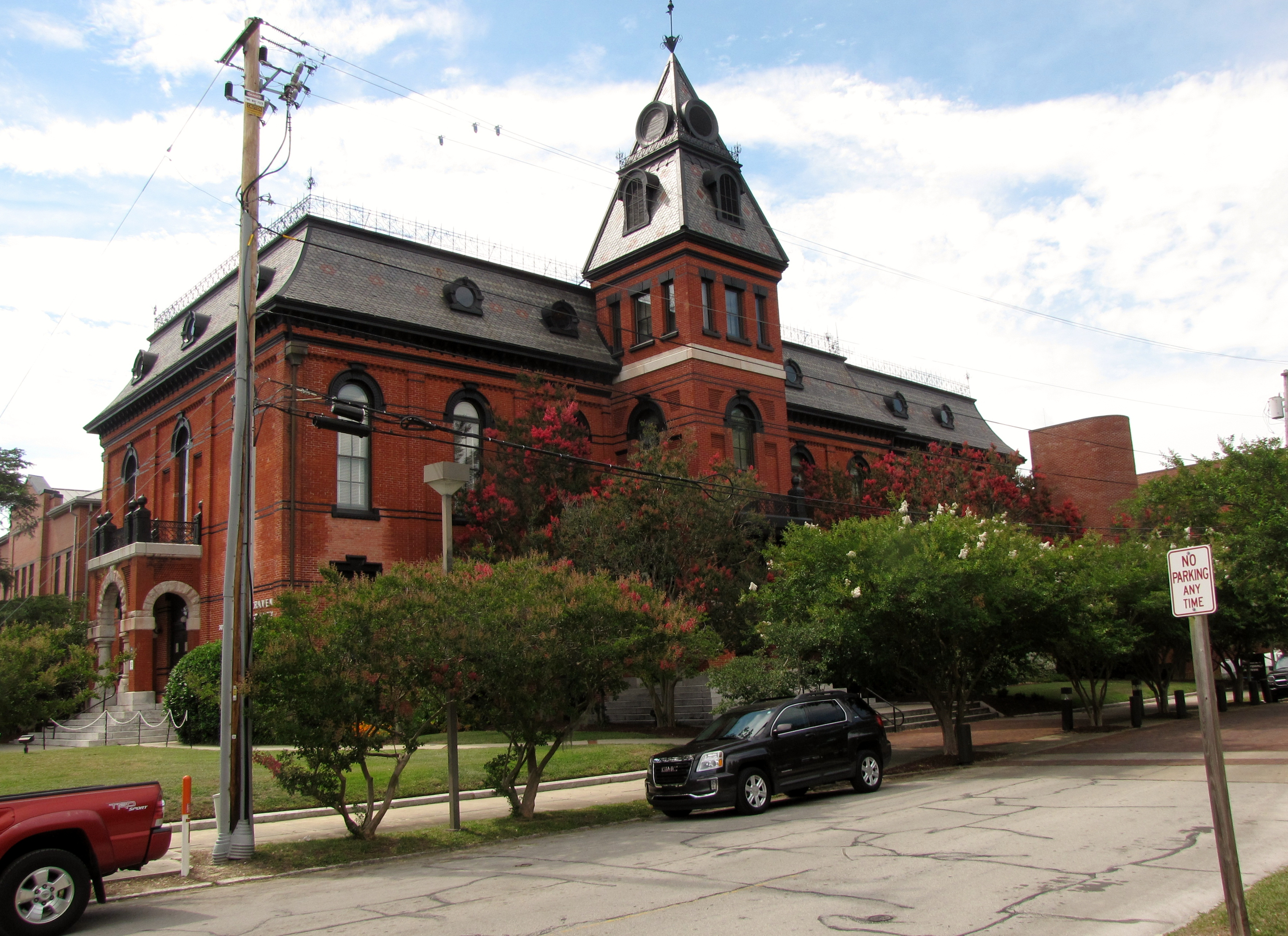
- Craven County Courthouse in New Bern

- Flag Seal

- Location within the U.S. state of North Carolina
- Interactive map of Craven County, North Carolina
- Coordinates: 35.12°N 77.08°W
- Country: United States
- State: North Carolina
- Founded: 1712
- Named for: William, Earl of Craven
- Seat: New Bern
- Largest community: New Bern

Area
  - Total: 773.28 sq mi (2,002.8 km^{2})
  - Land: 706.57 sq mi (1,830.0 km^{2})
  - Water: 66.71 sq mi (172.8 km^{2}) 8.63%

Population (2020)
  - Total: 100,720
  - Estimate (2025): 105,025 ▲
  - Density: 142.55/sq mi (55.04/km^{2})
- Time zone: UTC−5 (Eastern)
  - Summer (DST): UTC−4 (EDT)
- Congressional district: 3rd
- Website: www.cravencountync.gov

Craven County is a county located in the U.S. state of North Carolina. As of the 2020 census, the population was 100,720. Its county seat is New Bern. The county was created in 1705 as Archdale Precinct from the now-extinct Bath County. It was renamed Craven Precinct in 1712 and gained county status in 1739. It is named for William, Earl of Craven, who lived from 1606 to 1697. Craven County is part of the New Bern, NC Micropolitan Statistical Area.

== History ==
=== Early history ===
On August 4, 1661, George Durant purchased land from Cisketando, king of the Yeopim Indian tribe. On March 13, 1662, a second purchase was made from Kilcocanen, another Yeopim. By 1662 Durant was living in Virginia on a tract of land along the Perquimans River which flows into Albemarle Sound, which became part of the Carolina colony in 1665.

=== Creation ===
The land eventually constituting Craven was first organized as a portion of Bath County. On December 3, 1705, a portion of Bath was split off to form the new Archdale County. In about 1712 it was renamed Craven County. According to historian William S. Powell, it was most likely named in honor of William, Lord Craven a lord proprietor of the Carolina colony who died the previous year. Others state that the county was named for William's great uncle, William, Earl of Craven, who was one of the original eight lords proprietor of the colony, or the Lord Craven's son, also William, Lord Craven, who was actively serving as a lord proprietor at the time the county's name was changed. In 1722 a portion of Craven was split off to form Carteret County. New Hanover County and Johnston County were formed from Craven in 1729 and 1746, respectively. Craven's borders were altered and redrawn several times between 1757 and 1852.

During the initial years of colonization, the population of Craven County was sparse and grew slowly. By 1740, however, the town of New Bern began growing rapidly and became the seat for the Governorship. John Carter served as the first sheriff of Craven County, but died in 1740 in the line of duty, when ambushed by an outlaw he was trying to apprehend. In 1746 an act was passed establishing New Bern as the capital of the province and, although the act was later repealed, the General Court met at New Bern in Craven County after 1747.

In 1749 James Davis, the colony's first printer, arrived at New Bern and became the official printer for the North Carolina Assembly. In 1751, Davis established and began printing the North Carolina Gazette, North Carolina's first newspaper. In 1754, he was elected Sheriff of Craven County.

=== Antebellum period ===
Craven developed an economy centered around agriculture, timber and turpentine, small manufacturing, and commerce emanating from the port of New Bern. Various fruits and vegetables were among the most popular crops, with cotton production declining in popularity after adverse weather conditions in 1821. Some cattle was also kept in the county. Commercial fishing became more common in the late 1840s, while shipbuilding declined later in the Antebellum period. Slaves served as a key labor force in the local economy, though unlike other eastern counties in the state, which had overwhelmingly rural slave populations, almost 40 percent of Craven's slaves were kept in New Bern.

The Panic of 1819 heavily impacted the county and triggered a two decade-long period of economic contraction. Railroad service was introduced in the 1850s. The population rose from 13,394 in 1820 to 16,268 by 1860, though poverty remained a problem and many born in the country migrated elsewhere in search of better economic prospects. Despite the difficulties, Craven remained a center of political and social activity in the state and New Bern remained one of the largest cities in North Carolina throughout the antebellum period.

=== Civil War ===
Following North Carolina's secession from the United States and entrance into the American Civil War on the side of the Confederate States of America in 1861, New Bern became a center for Confederate political and military activity. By March 1862, the white men of the county had formed nine permanent companies of troops and three temporary ones. Some of these forces served throughout the entire war's duration. The Battle of Hatteras Inlet Batteries in August 1861 gave United States forces a foothold in eastern North Carolina and provoked the flight of women and children from New Bern.

=== Reconstruction ===
The county's economy was heavily impacted by the Civil War with the depletion of livestock, damage of property, and the emancipation of slaves. Most food crop production also suffered, though cotton, tobacco, and rice yields increased. Lumber and naval stores industries persisted, though somewhat weakened. The conclusion of the conflict led to regained confidence in economic activity. The shipping industry in New Bern grew and several new businesses, including a bank, were established. Some black freedmen were assigned work by federal troops or enrolled into Freedmen's Bureau schools. Most of the rest found unskilled work in the local farming, fishing, and turpentine industries. Those that entered skilled labor professions were faced with a rivalry from white contemporaries.

The advent of Congressional Reconstruction in 1867 and 1868 led to profound political changes in Craven County. General Edward Canby, the commander of the Second Military District, replaced New Bern's municipal government and also chose the county's sheriff. Following registration efforts, black voters outnumbered whites in the county, and remained a majority of the electorate until the end of the century. Together with local whites who had held Unionist sympathies before the war and recently arrived carpetbaggers, they constituted a strong base for the Republican Party. In the returns for the 1868 elections, Republicans' margin of victory was the second largest among the counties in the state. A portion of Craven was annexed to the new Pamlico County in 1872.

== Geography ==
According to the U.S. Census Bureau, the county has a total area of 773.28 square miles (2,002.8 km^{2}), of which 706.57 square miles (1,830.0 km^{2}) is land and 66.71 square miles (172.8 km^{2}) (8.63%) is water. It is bordered by Pitt County and Beaufort County to the north, Pamlico County to the east, Carteret County to the south, Jones County to the west, and Lenoir County to the northwest. Craven County lies within the Neuse River Basin.

=== National protected areas ===
- Catfish Lake South Wilderness (part)
- Croatan National Forest (part)
- Pocosin Wilderness (part)
- Pond Pine Wilderness (part)
- Sheep Ridge Wilderness

=== State and local protected areas/sites ===
- Croatan Game Land (part)
- Dover Bay Game Land
- Great Lake Recreation Site (part)
- New Bern Battlefield Site
- Neuse River Game Land (part)
- Pine Cliff Recreation Area
- Latham-Whitehurst Nature Park
- Special Secondary Nursery Areas
- Tryon Palace

=== Major water bodies ===
- Adams Creek
- Alligator Gut
- Catfish Lake
- Clubfoot Creek
- Ellis Simon Lake
- Hancock Creek
- Intracoastal Waterway
- Little Lake
- Long Lake
- Neuse River
- Trent River
- Great Lake
- Upper Broad Creek

=== Major highways ===
- Future I-42
- US 17
- US 17 Bus. (New Bern)
- US 17 Bus. (Vanceboro)
- US 70
- NC 41
- NC 43
- NC 55
- NC 101
- NC 118
- NC 306

=== Major infrastructure ===
- Amtrak Thruway (New Bern and Havelock)
- Cherry Branch–Minnesott Beach Ferry (to Pamlico County)
- Coastal Carolina Regional Airport
- Marine Corps Air Station Cherry Point, military airfield located in Havelock

== Demographics ==
Historical population
Census	Pop.	Note	%±
1790	10,474		—
1800	10,245		−2.2%
1810	12,676		23.7%
1820	13,394		5.7%
1830	13,734		2.5%
1840	13,438		−2.2%
1850	14,709		9.5%
1860	16,268		10.6%
1870	20,516		26.1%
1880	19,729		−3.8%
1890	20,533		4.1%
1900	24,160		17.7%
1910	25,594		5.9%
1920	29,048		13.5%
1930	30,665		5.6%
1940	31,298		2.1%
1950	48,823		56.0%
1960	58,773		20.4%
1970	62,554		6.4%
1980	71,043		13.6%
1990	81,613		14.9%
2000	91,436		12.0%
2010	103,505		13.2%
2020	100,720		−2.7%
2025 (est.)	105,025	▲	4.3%
U.S. Decennial Census; 1790–1960 1900–1990; 1990–2000 2010 2020

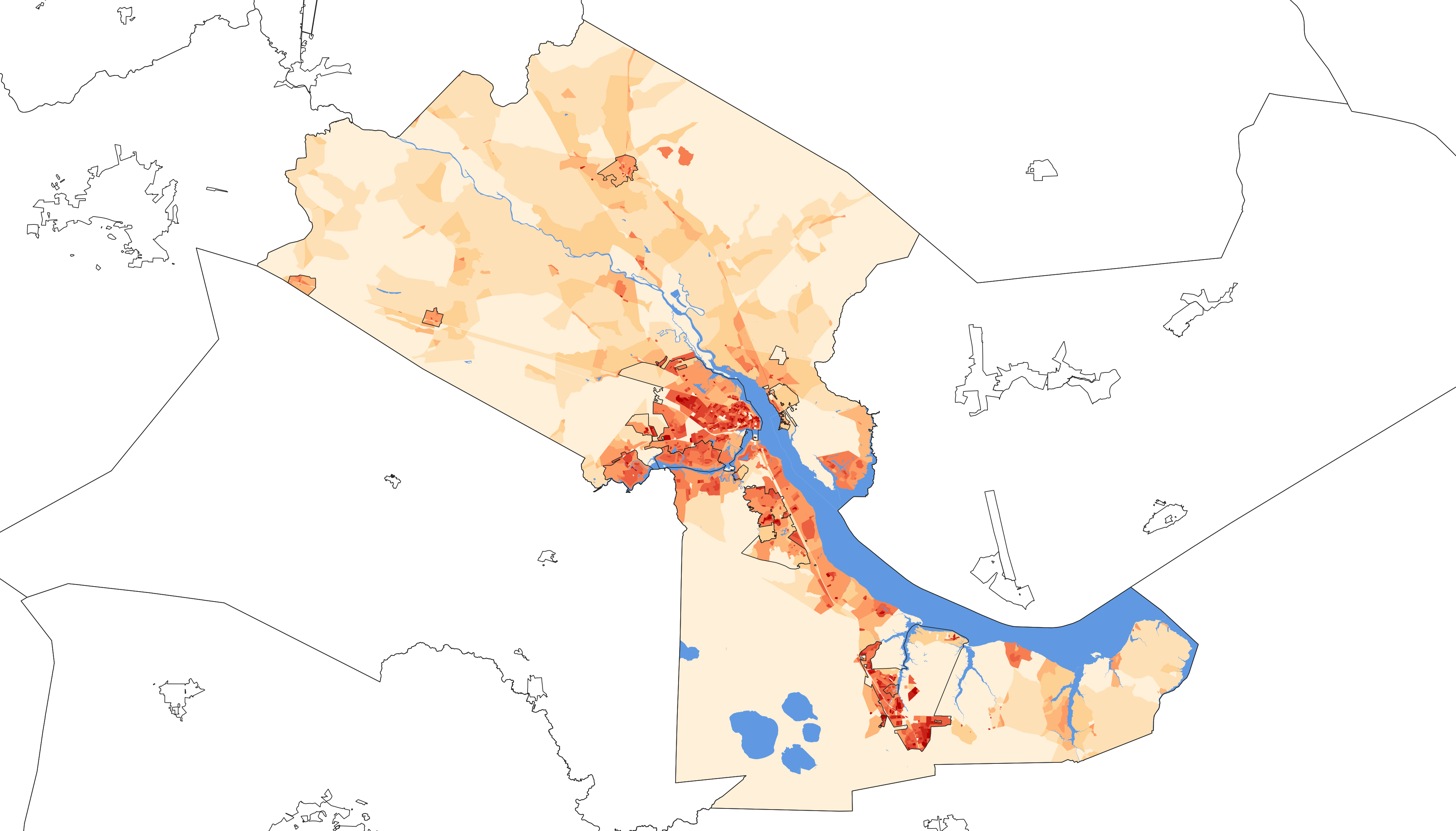
2020 population density of Craven County NC by census block

=== Racial and ethnic composition ===
Craven County, North Carolina – Racial and ethnic composition Note: the US Census treats Hispanic/Latino as an ethnic category. This table excludes Latinos from the racial categories and assigns them to a separate category. Hispanics/Latinos may be of any race.
Race / Ethnicity (NH = Non-Hispanic)	Pop 1980	Pop 1990	Pop 2000	Pop 2010	Pop 2020	% 1980	% 1990	% 2000	% 2010	% 2020
White alone (NH)	49,836	57,796	62,435	69,425	64,933	70.15%	70.82%	68.28%	67.07%	64.47%
Black or African American alone (NH)	19,111	20,940	22,729	22,868	19,903	26.90%	25.66%	24.86%	22.09%	19.76%
Native American or Alaska Native alone (NH)	184	299	357	420	318	0.26%	0.37%	0.39%	0.41%	0.32%
Asian alone (NH)	484	710	881	2,058	3,059	0.68%	0.87%	0.96%	1.99%	3.04%
Native Hawaiian or Pacific Islander alone (NH)	x	x	51	106	150	x	x	0.06%	0.10%	0.15%
Other race alone (NH)	77	47	119	125	446	0.11%	0.06%	0.13%	0.12%	0.44%
Mixed race or Multiracial (NH)	x	x	1,187	2,231	4,716	x	x	1.30%	2.16%	4.68%
Hispanic or Latino (any race)	1,351	1,821	3,677	6,272	7,195	1.90%	2.23%	4.02%	6.06%	7.14%
Total	71,043	81,613	91,436	103,505	100,720	100.00%	100.00%	100.00%	100.00%	100.00%

=== 2020 census ===
As of the 2020 census, there were 100,720 people, 40,932 households, and 28,502 families residing in the county.

The median age was 41.1 years. 20.8% of residents were under the age of 18 and 21.4% of residents were 65 years of age or older. For every 100 females there were 96.8 males, and for every 100 females age 18 and over there were 94.9 males age 18 and over.

The racial makeup of the county was 66.2% White, 20.1% Black or African American, 0.4% American Indian and Alaska Native, 3.1% Asian, 0.2% Native Hawaiian and Pacific Islander, 3.0% from some other race, and 7.1% from two or more races. Hispanic or Latino residents of any race comprised 7.1% of the population.

64.6% of residents lived in urban areas, while 35.4% lived in rural areas.

There were 40,932 households in the county, of which 27.4% had children under the age of 18 living in them. Of all households, 48.7% were married-couple households, 17.1% were households with a male householder and no spouse or partner present, and 28.6% were households with a female householder and no spouse or partner present. About 28.3% of all households were made up of individuals and 13.4% had someone living alone who was 65 years of age or older. There were 46,800 housing units, of which 12.5% were vacant. Among occupied housing units, 67.3% were owner-occupied and 32.7% were renter-occupied. The homeowner vacancy rate was 2.4% and the rental vacancy rate was 9.4%.

=== 2000 census ===
At the 2000 census, there were 91,436 people, 34,582 households, and 25,071 families residing in the county. The population density was 129 people per square mile (50 people/km^{2}). There were 38,150 housing units at an average density of 54 units per square mile (21 units/km^{2}). The racial makeup of the county was 69.94% White, 25.12% Black or African American, 0.42% Native American, 0.99% Asian, 0.06% Pacific Islander, 1.78% from other races, and 1.68% from two or more races. 4.02% of the population were Hispanic or Latino of any race.

There were 34,582 households, out of which 33.30% had children under the age of 18 living with them, 56.80% were married couples living together, 12.50% had a female householder with no husband present, and 27.50% were non-families. 23.40% of all households were made up of individuals, and 8.90% had someone living alone who was 65 years of age or older. The average household size was 2.50 and the average family size was 2.93.

In the county, the population was spread out, with 24.60% under the age of 18, 12.80% from 18 to 24, 27.90% from 25 to 44, 21.20% from 45 to 64, and 13.40% who were 65 years of age or older. The median age was 34 years. For every 100 females there were 101.90 males. For every 100 females age 18 and over, there were 101.50 males.

The median income for a household in the county was $35,966, and the median income for a family was $42,574. Males had a median income of $28,163 versus $21,412 for females. The per capita income for the county was $18,423. About 9.90% of families and 13.10% of the population were below the poverty line, including 18.50% of those under age 18 and 11.00% of those age 65 or over.

== Government and politics ==
=== Government ===
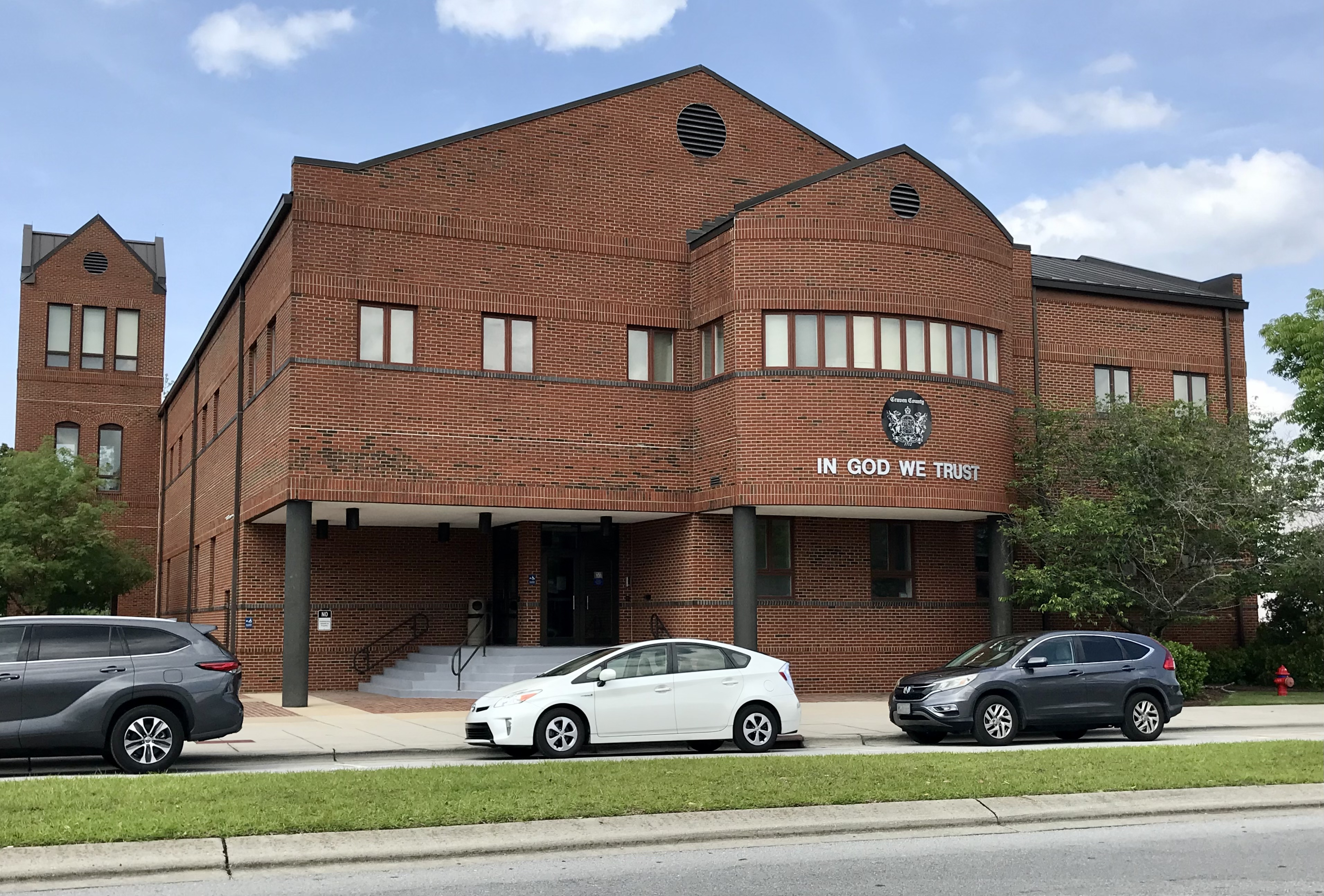
Craven County Administration Building in New Bern

Craven County is led by a seven-member board of commissioners, each of whom are elected to represent a district.

Craven County is a member of the Eastern Carolina Council of Governments, a regional multi-county planning and economic coordination body. It is located in the North Carolina Senate's 2nd district and the North Carolina House of Representatives' 3rd district, and 13th district.

Craven County lies within the bounds of the 4th Prosecutorial District, the 3B Superior Court District, and the 3B District Court District.

=== Judicial system and law enforcement ===
Craven County lies within the bounds of North Carolina's 4th Prosecutorial District, the 4th Superior Court District, and the 4th District Court District. The Craven County Sheriff's Office provides law enforcement services for the county, as well as operating the Craven County Detention Center.

=== Politics ===
United States presidential election results for Craven County, North Carolina
Year	Republican		Democratic		Third party(ies)	
Year	No.	%	No.	%	No.	%
1880	2,809	69.00%	1,180	28.99%	82	2.01%
1884	2,539	65.62%	1,330	34.38%	0	0.00%
1888	2,618	65.73%	1,359	34.12%	6	0.15%
1892	1,648	50.49%	1,305	39.98%	311	9.53%
1896	2,921	60.50%	1,810	37.49%	97	2.01%
1900	1,502	42.55%	2,028	57.45%	0	0.00%
1904	268	14.70%	1,555	85.30%	0	0.00%
1908	449	24.30%	1,399	75.70%	0	0.00%
1912	79	3.78%	1,819	87.12%	190	9.10%
1916	542	23.34%	1,780	76.66%	0	0.00%
1920	731	17.64%	3,413	82.36%	0	0.00%
1924	325	9.82%	2,942	88.86%	44	1.33%
1928	2,237	47.28%	2,494	52.72%	0	0.00%
1932	466	9.59%	4,375	90.02%	19	0.39%
1936	453	7.56%	5,543	92.44%	0	0.00%
1940	626	11.30%	4,916	88.70%	0	0.00%
1944	826	14.50%	4,872	85.50%	0	0.00%
1948	745	11.87%	5,039	80.26%	494	7.87%
1952	2,822	31.66%	6,092	68.34%	0	0.00%
1956	2,956	31.88%	6,317	68.12%	0	0.00%
1960	3,680	33.95%	7,158	66.05%	0	0.00%
1964	4,691	38.73%	7,422	61.27%	0	0.00%
1968	2,991	21.77%	4,240	30.86%	6,509	47.37%
1972	9,372	78.74%	2,384	20.03%	147	1.23%
1976	5,881	43.42%	7,553	55.77%	109	0.80%
1980	8,554	50.97%	7,781	46.36%	448	2.67%
1984	12,893	64.04%	7,186	35.69%	55	0.27%
1988	12,057	62.10%	7,313	37.66%	47	0.24%
1992	11,575	45.77%	9,998	39.54%	3,714	14.69%
1996	13,264	52.65%	10,317	40.96%	1,610	6.39%
2000	19,494	60.95%	12,213	38.18%	278	0.87%
2004	23,575	62.44%	14,019	37.13%	162	0.43%
2008	24,901	55.83%	19,352	43.39%	345	0.77%
2012	26,928	58.32%	18,763	40.64%	479	1.04%
2016	27,731	59.00%	17,630	37.51%	1,640	3.49%
2020	31,032	58.48%	21,148	39.85%	885	1.67%
2024	33,477	59.60%	22,011	39.18%	685	1.22%

Craven is a typical “Solid South” county in its presidential voting patterns. It was solidly Democratic after black disenfranchisement in 1900: between 1904 and 1948 only in 1928 when a large anti-Catholic vote was cast against Al Smith did the GOP reach one quarter of the vote, and four times their proportion fell into single figures. The national Democratic party's support for the Civil Rights Movement caused its white electorate to defect to George Wallace’s American Independent campaign in 1968. Since that time, Craven has become a strongly Republican county. The last Democrat to carry Craven County was Jimmy Carter in 1976. As of March 2022, there were 70,286 registered voters in the county. Of those, 26,225 were registered Republican, 20,135 were registered Democrats, and 23,393 registered unaffiliated.

== Education ==
Craven County Schools has 25 schools, including Havelock High School, New Bern High School, and West Craven High School.

== Communities ==
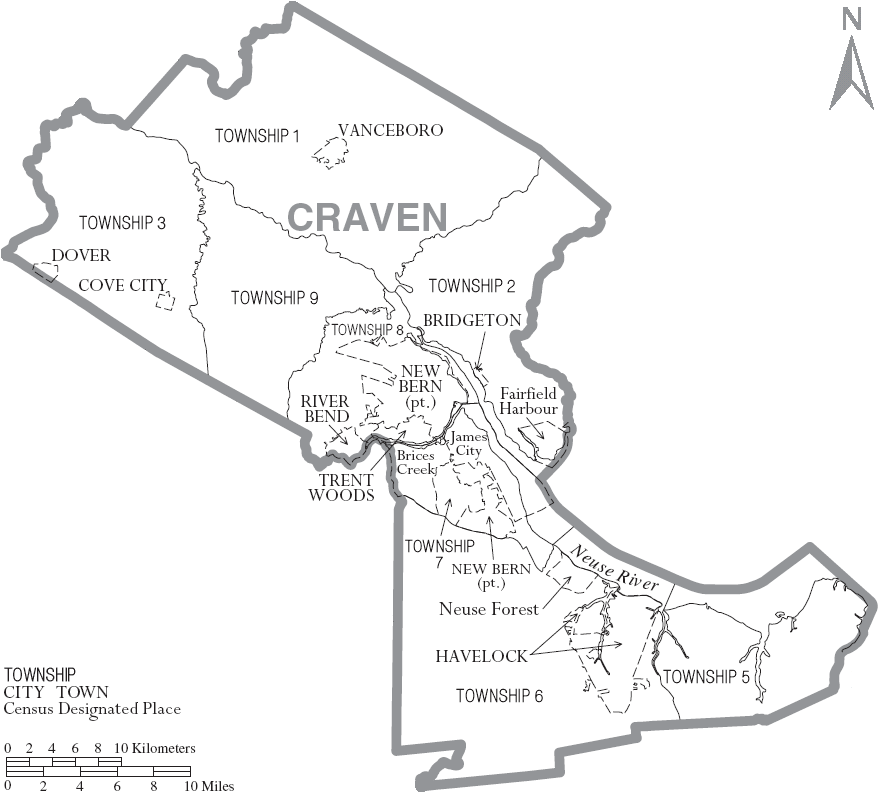
Map of Craven County with municipal and township labels

=== Cities ===
- Havelock
- New Bern (county seat and largest community)

=== Towns ===
- Bridgeton
- Cove City
- Dover
- River Bend
- Trent Woods
- Vanceboro

=== Census-designated places ===
- Brices Creek
- Cherry Branch
- Fairfield Harbour
- James City
- Neuse Forest

=== Other unincorporated communities ===
- Adams Creek
- Askin
- Ernul
- Fort Barnwell
- Harlowe
- Riverdale

=== Townships ===
By the requirements of the North Carolina Constitution of 1868, the county was divided into 8 townships which do not have names:

- Township 1
- Township 2
- Township 3
- Township 5
- Township 6
- Township 7
- Township 8
- Township 9

== See also ==
- List of counties in North Carolina
- National Register of Historic Places listings in Craven County, North Carolina
- PepsiCo, former headquarters was located in New Bern, where the drink was first coined. The drink was originally created by Caleb Bradham.

== Works cited ==
- Connor, Robert Digges Wimberly (1919). History of North Carolina. Vol. I. Chicago : New York : Lewis Publishing Co.
- Corbitt, David Leroy (2000). The formation of the North Carolina counties, 1663-1943 (reprint ed.). Raleigh: North Carolina Division of Archives and History. OCLC 46398241.
- Crittenden, Charles christopher; Lacy, Dan, eds. (1938). The historical records of North Carolina : the county records. Vol. I. Raleigh : The North Carolina Historical Commission.
- Crittenden, Charles christopher; Lacy, Dan, eds. (1938). The historical records of North Carolina : the county records. Vol. II. Raleigh : The North Carolina Historical Commission.
- Dill, Alonzo Thomas Jr. (January 1946). "Eighteenth Century New Bern". Dill, Eighteenth-Century New Bern. 23 (1). North Carolina Office of Archives and History: 47–48. JSTOR 23515401.
- Powell, William S. (1976). The North Carolina Gazetteer: A Dictionary of Tar Heel Places. Chapel Hill: The University of North Carolina Press. ISBN 9780807812471.
- Powell, William S., ed. (2000). Dictionary of North Carolina biography. University of North Carolina Press. ISBN 978-0-8078-67013. - link to Davis biography
- Thomas, Isaiah (1874). The history of printing in America, with a biography of printers. Vol. I. New York, B. Franklin.
- —— (1874). The history of printing in America, with a biography of printers. Vol. II. New York, B. Franklin.
- Watson, Alan D. (1987). A History of New Bern and Craven County. New Bern: Tryon Palace Commission. OCLC 17398679.
- Wroth, Lawrence C. (1938). The Colonial Printer. Portland, Me., The Southworth-Anthoensen press.
