= Bath County, North Carolina =

Historic county of North Carolina

- Former county
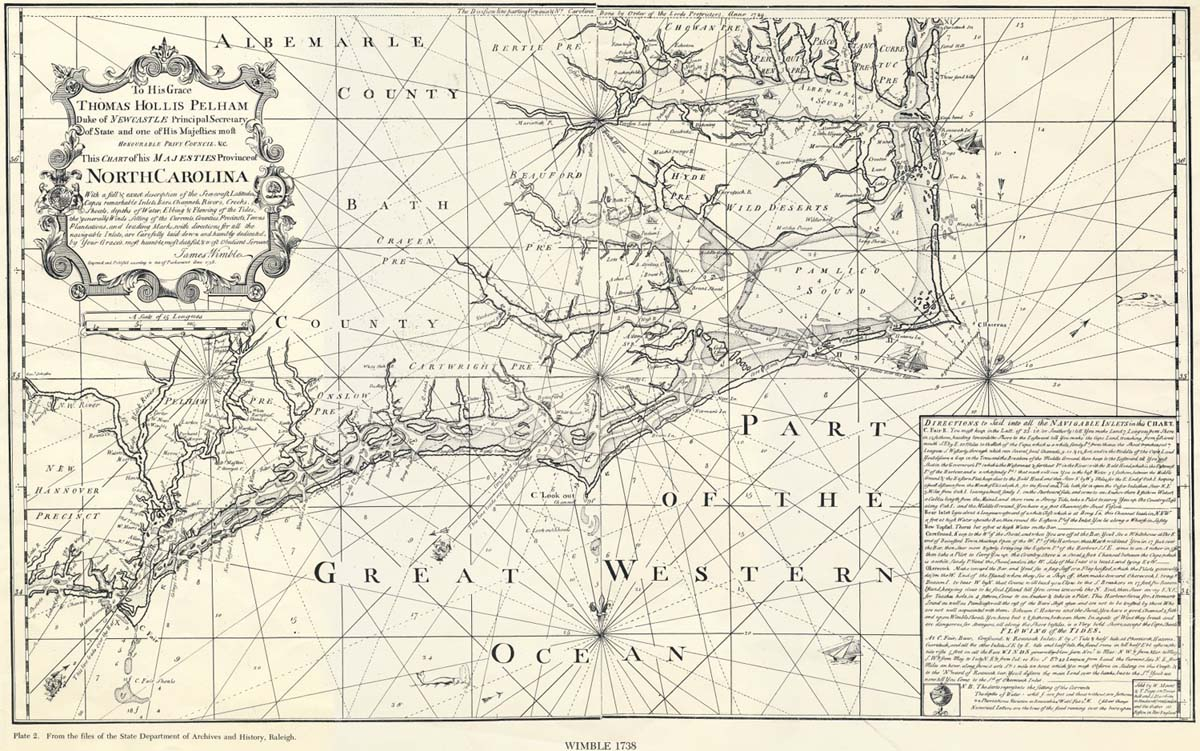
- Albemarle and Bath counties (1738)
- Etymology: John Granville, Earl of Bath
- Former location in North Carolina
- Coordinates: 35.481°N 76.803°W
- Country: United States
- State: North Carolina
- Established: 1696
- Extinct: 1739
- Seat: Bath Town
- Precincts: Precincts: Pamtecough (Beaufort); Wyckham (Hyde); Archdale (Craven); New Hanover; Bladen; Onslow; Carteret

Bath County is an extinct county formerly located in the British American colony of North Carolina. The county was established in 1696 and was abolished in 1739. The original three precincts of Bath County—Pamtecough, Wyckham and Archdale—were renamed in 1712 to Beaufort, Hyde, and Craven Precincts, respectively. These original precincts—along with the four other precincts of the county (Bladen, Onslow, Carteret, and New Hanover)—became Beaufort, Hyde, Craven, Bladen, Onslow, Carteret, and New Hanover counties when Bath County was officially abolished in 1738.

Carteret Precinct was created from Craven in 1722. Then New Hanover was created from Craven in 1729. Two precincts were created from New Hanover in 1734: Bladen and Onslow.

The town of Bath (still in existence as NC's oldest town) was a stopping place of Edward Teach, better known as the pirate Blackbeard. He is said to have married a local girl and briefly settled in the harbor town of Bath around 1716.

== See also ==
- List of former United States counties
- List of North Carolina counties
