= Fort Barnwell, North Carolina =

Unincorporated community in North Carolina, US

Coordinates: 35°17′29″N 77°20′06″W

Fort Barnwell is an unincorporated community in Craven County, North Carolina, United States. The fort was founded by Colonel John Barnwell of the South Carolina militia in 1712, and was abandoned in 1715. The fort, used in the Tuscarora War, is now an archeological site and a National Historic Landmark.

The present-day town of Fort Barnwell is located 18 miles east of Kinston and 22 miles west of New Bern near the Neuse River. Highway 55 runs through the town. It receives mail through the Dover Post Office (zip code 28526), and is served by the Fort Barnwell Volunteer Fire Department. The community, much like other small towns in the area, continues to grow in size as a satellite city to New Bern.
