= Coastal Carolina Regional Airport =

Airport in New Bern, North Carolina, United States

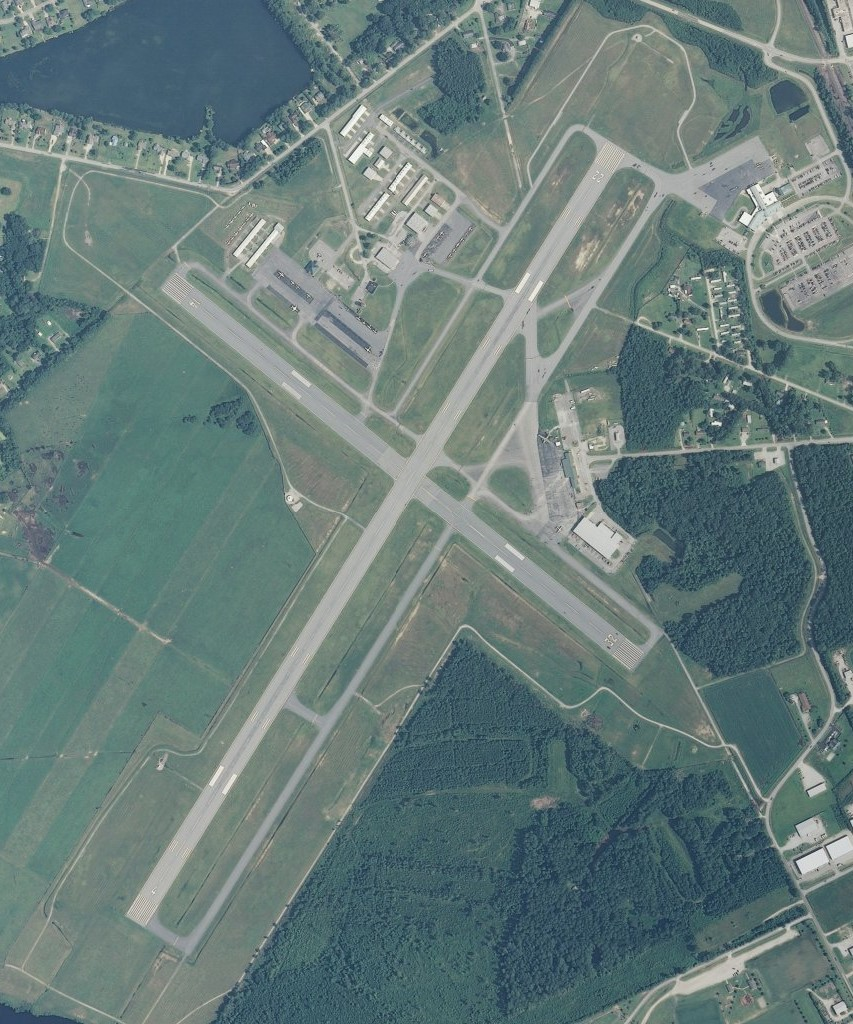
- USGS 2006 orthophoto
- IATA: EWN; ICAO: KEWN; FAA LID: EWN

Summary
- Owner: Craven County
- Serves: Crystal Coast
- Location: New Bern, North Carolina
- Opened: 1931 (95 years ago)
- Elevation AMSL: 18 ft (5.5 m)
- Coordinates: 35°04′23″N 077°02′35″W
- Website: www.flyewn.com

Maps
- FAA airport diagram
- Interactive map of Coastal Carolina Regional Airport

Runways
Direction	Length		Surface
Direction	ft	m	Surface
04/22	6,453	1,967	Asphalt
14/32	4,000	1,219	Asphalt

Statistics
- Aircraft operations (2019): 47,313
- Based aircraft (2017): 85
- Total passengers served (12 months ending Feb. 2019): 250,000
- Source: Federal Aviation Administration

Coastal Carolina Regional Airport (IATA: EWN, ICAO: KEWN, FAA LID: EWN) is a commercial airport located three miles (5 km) southeast of the central business district of New Bern, a city in Craven County, North Carolina, United States. EWN covers 785 acres (318 ha) of land.

Coastal Carolina Regional Airport is the closest commercial airport to North Carolina's Crystal Coast. The airport is the main connection to such Crystal Coast destinations as Cape Lookout National Seashore, Cape Hatteras National Seashore, the Outer Banks, Crystal Coast, Marine Corps Air Station Cherry Point, Atlantic Beach, North Carolina, various seasonal camps including Camp Sea Gull/Seafarer and Camp Don Lee, and Emerald Isle, North Carolina.

On July 10, 2008 the North Carolina General Assembly ratified a bill that allowed Craven County Regional Airport to change its name to Coastal Carolina Regional Airport. The name change became effective on August 15, 2008.

It is included in the Federal Aviation Administration (FAA) National Plan of Integrated Airport Systems for 2017–2021, in which it is categorized as a non-hub primary commercial service facility.

== History ==
The airport was previously named Craven County Regional Airport, Simmons-Nott Airport, and New Bern Regional Airport. Simmons-Nott came from North Carolina Senator Furnifold McLendel Simmons who was present at the 1931 dedication of the new terminal. During an air performance for the dedication, United States Marine Corps First Lieutenant Joel Nott was killed. Senator Simmons required that 1stLt Nott's named be added to the airport to pay homage for the fallen military officer.

On August 8, 1941, the Marine Corps leased the airport to become an outlying field of Marine Corps Air Station Cherry Point and named it OLF Camp Mitchell. In the beginning of 1942, the Army Air Forces used the field for anti-submarine patrols. The field was later closed for seven months during 1942 while two hard surface runways and a runway lighting system were installed. The first Marine aviation units began to arrive at the field in February 1943. Among the units to train at the field during the war was Marine Aircraft Group 34 and fighter squadrons VMF-324 and VMF-511. In January 1944, plans were announced to expand the field. However, these plans were abandoned because the Marine Corps acquired surplus Army fields.

In 2011, Coast Carolina Regional Airport hosted three Honor Flights for World War II veterans.

Craven Regional Airport has previously been serviced by Midway Airlines, American Eagle, Piedmont Airlines, Charter Express, United Airlines, Delta Air Lines, Wheeler Airline, Henson Airlines and National Airlines. In May 2024, Breeze Airways started operations at the airport. In early February 2025 the airport announced that American Eagle would be using dual class aircraft for service.

Today, scheduled commercial flights tend to consist of four arrivals and four departures per day.

== Terminal ==
Coastal Carolina Regional Airport currently has three gates for use by airlines, all of which are located on the central pier and share a common boarding area. Also located in the terminal are an eatery, named Triple Play Oasis Restaurant & Sports Bar, and several car rental agencies.

The $17-million terminal for EWN was completed on November 5, 1999, by the LPA Group. As of June 2006, Coastal Carolina Regional has approved their 20-year master plan, which included an extension of the main runway, the runway safety area expansion, a larger noise zone, and a new control tower. These expansions aim to create better capacity and services at the airport, as EWN is currently looking for additional airlines to provide additional air service apart from Breeze and American Airlines.

As of June 2024, the terminal expansion on the airport is complete and open to passengers.

== Airlines and destinations ==
=== Passenger ===
Airlines	Destinations
American Eagle	Charlotte
Breeze Airways	Hartford, Orlando

== Statistics ==
=== Top destinations ===
Busiest domestic routes from EWN (September 2025 - August 2026)
Rank	City	Passengers	Carriers
1	Charlotte, North Carolina	69,290	American
2	Orlando, Florida	7,070	Breeze
3	Hartford, Connecticut	5,970	Breeze
4	Charleston, South Carolina	100	
5	Greensboro, North Carolina	40	

=== Carrier shares ===
Largest airlines at EWN (September 2025 - August 2026)
Rank	Airline	Passengers	Share
1	Piedmont Airlines	121,000	68.44%
2	Breeze Airways	35,480	20.00%
3	PSA Airlines	20,510	11.56%
	Other	0	0.00%

== General aviation ==
Coastal Carolina Regional is in the top 10 of North Carolina's airports.

For the 12-month period ending May 31, 2016, the airport had 35,109 aircraft operations, an average of 96 per day: 73% general aviation, 21% air taxi, 5% military, and <1% commercial. In May 2017, there were 85 aircraft based at this airport: 75 single-engine, 5 multi-engine, 2 jet, and 3 helicopter.

General aviation provides most of the aircraft movements at EWN. The fixed-base operators at EWN are Tidewater Air, LLC and Tradewind International. A parachute jumping school is currently seeking approval to be based at EWN.

In August 2020, Coastal Carolina Regional Airport awarded a $5.8M contract to build a new Aircraft Rescue and Fire Fighting (ARFF) facility.

== Accidents ==
- On November 20, 1966, a Piedmont Airlines Martin 4-0-4 on a positioning flight crashed 3.1 miles (5 km) south of EWN on approach, colliding with trees and crashing into a wooded area. All three occupants were killed.

== See also ==
- List of airports in North Carolina
