= Vanceboro, North Carolina =

- Town
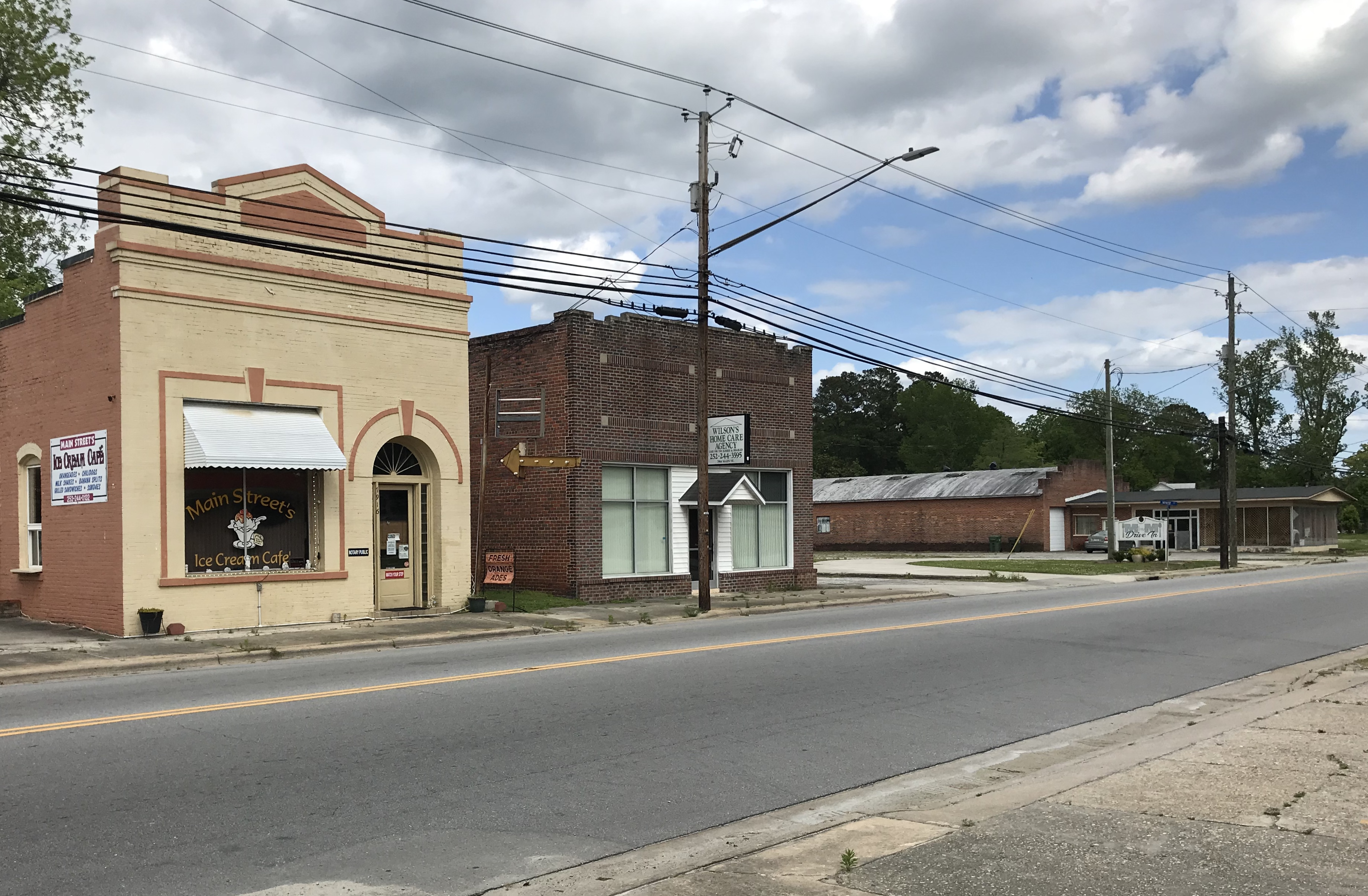
- Main Street

- Seal

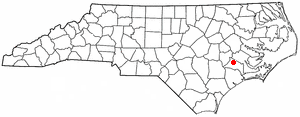
- Location of Vanceboro, North Carolina
- Coordinates: 35°18′11″N 77°09′24″W
- Country: United States
- State: North Carolina
- County: Craven
- Named for: Zebulon Baird Vance

Area
  - Total: 1.71 sq mi (4.44 km^{2})
  - Land: 1.71 sq mi (4.44 km^{2})
  - Water: 0 sq mi (0.00 km^{2})
- Elevation: 23 ft (7.0 m)

Population (2020)
  - Total: 869
  - Density: 506.9/sq mi (195.73/km^{2})
- Time zone: UTC-5 (Eastern (EST))
  - Summer (DST): UTC-4 (EDT)
- ZIP code: 28586
- Area code: 252
- FIPS code: 37-69680
- GNIS feature ID: 2406789
- Website: www.vanceboronc.com

Vanceboro is a town in Craven County, North Carolina, United States. As of the 2020 census, Vanceboro had a population of 869. Originally called Swift Creek, residents renamed the town for Zebulon B. Vance after he visited there during his 1876 campaign for governor. It is part of the New Bern, North Carolina Metropolitan Statistical Area.

== Geography ==
According to the United States Census Bureau, the town has area of 1.7 square miles (4.4 km^{2}), all land.

== Demographics ==
Historical population
| Census | Pop. | Note | %± |
|---|---|---|---|
| 1880 | 146 | | — |
| 1900 | 291 | | — |
| 1910 | 392 | | 34.7% |
| 1920 | 540 | | 37.8% |
| 1930 | 742 | | 37.4% |
| 1940 | 826 | | 11.3% |
| 1950 | 753 | | −8.8% |
| 1960 | 806 | | 7.0% |
| 1970 | 758 | | −6.0% |
| 1980 | 833 | | 9.9% |
| 1990 | 946 | | 13.6% |
| 2000 | 898 | | −5.1% |
| 2010 | 1,005 | | 11.9% |
| 2020 | 869 | | −13.5% |
U.S. Decennial Census

=== 2020 census ===
Vanceboro racial composition
| Race | Number | Percentage |
|---|---|---|
| White (non-Hispanic) | 555 | 63.87% |
| Black or African American (non-Hispanic) | 247 | 28.42% |
| Native American | 2 | 0.23% |
| Other/Mixed | 41 | 4.72% |
| Hispanic or Latino | 24 | 2.76% |

As of the 2020 United States census, there were 869 people, 464 households, and 318 families residing in the town.

=== 2000 census ===
As of the census of 2000, there were 898 people, 385 households, and 262 families residing in the town. The population density was 521.2 inhabitants per square mile (201.2/km^{2}). There were 434 housing units at an average density of 251.9 per square mile (97.3/km^{2}). The racial makeup of the town was 73.16% White, 24.16% African American, 0.33% Native American, 0.56% from other races, and 1.78% from two or more races. Hispanic or Latino of any race were 1.89% of the population.

There were 385 households, out of which 38.7% had children under the age of 18 living with them, 44.9% were married couples living together, 21.0% had a female householder with no husband present, and 31.7% were non-families. 29.6% of all households were made up of individuals, and 15.3% had someone living alone who was 65 years of age or older. The average household size was 2.32 and the average family size was 2.87.

== Education ==
=== High school ===
- West Craven High School

=== Middle school ===
- West Craven Middle School

=== Elementary school ===
- Vanceboro Farm Life Elementary School

== Local festivals and celebrations ==
Every year, The Vanceboro Strawberry Festival takes place in Spring, usually in early May. Festivities include a parade down Main Street, food, and games. Starting in 2006, the night before the parade there is a street dance. Food and games are located on the grounds of Vanceboro Farm Life Elementary School.
