= Trent Woods, North Carolina =

- Town
- Town of Trent Woods
- Trent Woods Town Hall

- Seal

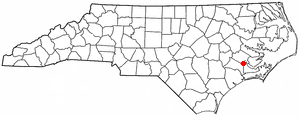
- Location of Trent Woods, North Carolina
- Coordinates: 35°04′52″N 77°05′40″W
- Country: United States
- State: North Carolina
- County: Craven

Area
  - Total: 3.56 sq mi (9.21 km^{2})
  - Land: 2.97 sq mi (7.70 km^{2})
  - Water: 0.58 sq mi (1.51 km^{2})
- Elevation: 13 ft (4.0 m)

Population (2020)
  - Total: 4,074
  - Density: 1,370.6/sq mi (529.19/km^{2})
- Time zone: UTC-5 (Eastern (EST))
  - Summer (DST): UTC-4 (EDT)
- ZIP code: 28562
- Area code: 252
- FIPS code: 37-68340
- GNIS feature ID: 2406749
- Website: trentwoodsnc.org

Trent Woods is a town in Craven County, North Carolina, United States. As of the 2020 census, the town had a population of 4,074. It is part of the New Bern, North Carolina Micropolitan Statistical Area.

== History ==
The Dr. Earl S. Sloan House was listed on the National Register of Historic Places in 1986.

== Geography ==
According to the United States Census Bureau, the town has a total area of 3.4 square miles (8.8 km^{2}), of which 2.9 square miles (7.5 km^{2}) is land and 0.5 square miles (1.3 km^{2}) (14.83%) is water.

== Demographics ==
Historical population
Census	Pop.	Note	%±
1960	517		—
1970	719		39.1%
1980	1,177		63.7%
1990	2,366		101.0%
2000	4,192		77.2%
2010	4,155		−0.9%
2020	4,074		−1.9%
U.S. Decennial Census

=== 2020 census ===
Trent Woods racial composition
Race	Number	Percentage
White (non-Hispanic)	3,785	92.91%
Black or African American (non-Hispanic)	51	1.25%
Native American	3	0.07%
Asian	39	0.96%
Other/Mixed	125	3.07%
Hispanic or Latino	71	1.74%

As of the 2020 census, Trent Woods had a population of 4,074 and 1,346 families. The median age was 52.1 years. 18.9% of residents were under the age of 18 and 31.5% were 65 years of age or older. For every 100 females, there were 89.4 males, and for every 100 females age 18 and over, there were 88.1 males age 18 and over.

100.0% of residents lived in urban areas, while 0.0% lived in rural areas.

There were 1,741 households in Trent Woods, of which 25.6% had children under the age of 18 living in them. Of all households, 64.9% were married-couple households, 9.3% were households with a male householder and no spouse or partner present, and 23.1% were households with a female householder and no spouse or partner present. About 23.7% of all households were made up of individuals, and 16.0% had someone living alone who was 65 years of age or older.

There were 1,843 housing units, of which 5.5% were vacant. The homeowner vacancy rate was 1.5% and the rental vacancy rate was 4.9%.

=== 2000 census ===
As of the census of 2000, there were 4,192 people, 1,692 households, and 1,360 families residing in the town. The population density was 1,429.6 inhabitants per square mile (552.0/km^{2}). There were 1,744 housing units at an average density of 594.7 per square mile (229.6/km^{2}). The racial makeup of the town was 97.61% White, 1.07% African American, 0.38% Asian, 0.02% Pacific Islander, 0.60% from other races, and 0.31% from two or more races. Hispanic or Latino of any race were 0.64% of the population.

There were 1,692 households, out of which 31.3% had children under the age of 18 living with them, 73.2% were married couples living together, 5.6% had a female householder with no husband present, and 19.6% were non-families. 17.8% of all households were made up of individuals, and 10.5% had someone living alone who was 65 years of age or older. The average household size was 2.48 and the average family size was 2.80.

In the town, the population was spread out, with 23.8% under the age of 18, 2.9% from 18 to 24, 20.8% from 25 to 44, 30.5% from 45 to 64, and 22.1% who were 65 years of age or older. The median age was 47 years. For every 100 females, there were 92.5 males. For every 100 females age 18 and over, there were 88.4 males.

The median income for a household in the town was $63,482, and the median income for a family was $71,336. Males had a median income of $49,219 versus $35,224 for females. The per capita income for the town was $36,690. About 1.4% of families and 2.1% of the population were below the poverty line, including 1.9% of those under age 18 and none of those age 65 or over.
