= West Craven High School (Vanceboro, North Carolina) =

American public school in North Carolina

Location
- 2600 Streets Ferry Road; Vanceboro, North Carolina 28586; United States; 35°14′15″N 77°08′15″W

Information
- School type: Public
- Established: 1971 (55 years ago)
- School district: Craven County Schools
- CEEB code: 344065
- Principal: Dr. Nannette Walston-Moore
- Teaching staff: 51.79 (FTE)
- Grades: 9–12
- Enrollment: 821 (2023–2024)
- Student to teacher ratio: 15.85
- Colors: Red and royal blue
- Athletics: NCHSAA 4A
- Athletics conference: Coastal Conference
- Team name: Eagles
- Yearbook: Aquila
- Website: wch.cravenk12.org

West Craven High School is a secondary school located in Vanceboro, North Carolina. The school was established in 1971.

== History ==
The school was opened in 1971, with the first graduating class graduating in the spring of 1976. The school was built in the exact same style as inter county rival Havelock High School as Havelock was to have been originally named East Craven High School.

== Extracurricular activities ==
West Craven is a member of the North Carolina High School Athletic Association (NCHSAA) and are classified as a 4A school. The school is a member of the Three Rivers 4A Conference.

Teams are fielded in baseball, basketball, cheerleading, cross country, football, golf, soccer, softball, tennis, volleyball, and wrestling. The Eagles have developed a longtime rivalry with New Bern High School, a high school located just 12 miles away from WCHS. The Eagles biggest rival, however, would be conference and cross county foe, Havelock High School.

The Eagles play their home football games in the on-campus stadium named for longtime head coach Clay Jordan. Clay Jordan Stadium was named so in 2008, Jordan's final season with the Eagles. The basketball court was also named after an important coach of the Eagles basketball team. In 2010, the gymnasium's court was named Lorenzo Jones Court, after the winningest men's basketball coach in WCHS history. The Baseball field is also named for an influential figure in WCHS sports, Don Hughes. Don Hughes played football at East Carolina University and returned to West Craven to teach physical education while helping coach football and baseball. His most influential work for the Eagles, however, came as principal of the school.

== Notable alumni ==
- Shawn Armstrong, MLB pitcher
- Jesse Campbell, former NFL safety
- Justin Hardy, former NFL wide receiver and CFL All-Star
- Roland Hooks, former NFL running back
- George Koonce, former NFL linebacker, Super Bowl XXXI champion with the Green Bay Packers
- Beth Wood, 17th Auditor of North Carolina, first female state auditor
- Anthony Wright, former NFL quarterback, Super Bowl XLII champion with the New York Giants
