= Croatan National Forest =

National forest in North Carolina

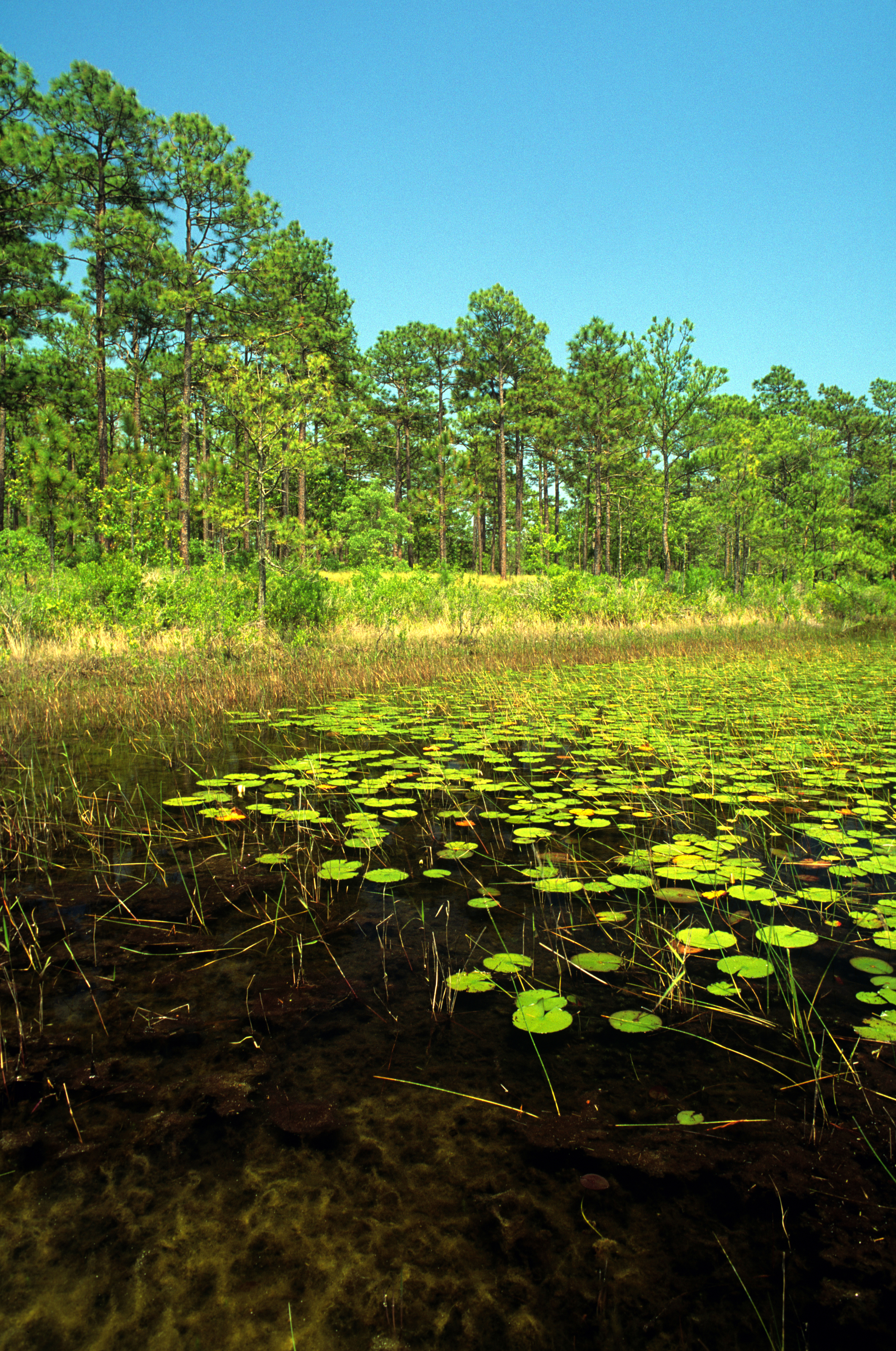
- View from Patsy Pond Nature Trail, in the Croatan National Forest.

- Location within the United States
- Location: Craven / Carteret / Jones counties, North Carolina, United States
- Nearest city: Havelock, NC
- Coordinates: 34.914441°N 77.056446°W
- Area: 159,885 acres (647.03 km^{2})
- Established: July 29, 1936
- Governing body: U.S. Forest Service
- Website: Croatan National Forest

The Croatan National Forest (/ˈkroʊətæn/) is a U.S. national forest, was established on July 29, 1936, and is located on the Atlantic coast of North Carolina. It is administered by the United States Forest Service, a part of the United States Department of Agriculture. The forest is managed together with the other three North Carolina National Forests (Nantahala, Pisgah, and Uwharrie) from common headquarters in Asheville, North Carolina. However, Croatan has a local ranger district office in New Bern.

In 2023, more than 32,000 acres burned in the Great Lakes Fire, which began on April 19 and continued until heavy rains in June.

== Geography ==
The forest covers 159,885 acres (647.0 km^{2}) of coastal land. It is bordered on three sides by the Neuse River, the Bogue Sound, and the White Oak River. The Croatan Forest is characteristic of its pine forests, salt estuaries, bogs, and pocosins. The forest is suitable for hiking, camping, hunting, trail biking, and all-terrain vehicles. The surrounding rivers, inland lakes, and creeks allow for swimming, fishing, boating, and canoeing. The forest is close to the cities of New Bern, NC and Morehead City, NC. It also surrounds the Marine Corps Air Station Cherry Point.

== Trails ==
Many hiking trails can be found throughout the Croatan Forest such as the Neusiok Trail which offers 21 miles (34 km) of trail through swamps and pine forests. Other trails include the Cedar Point Tideland Trail which traverses through a salt marsh and along the White Oak River, the Island Creek Forest Walk featuring a forest of hardwoods, and the Black Swamp OHV Trail which offers eight miles (13 km) for off-road vehicles and bikes. The 13 mile long Catfish Lake Rd. provides many roads and trails for you to explore. There is also a 14.1 mile trail, called the Weetock trail starting at the entrance to Long point landing road along NC Hwy 58 and continuing through the woods towards the Whiteoak river and turning around to end back on Hwy 58 roughly a quarter mile from the start point.

== Flora and fauna ==
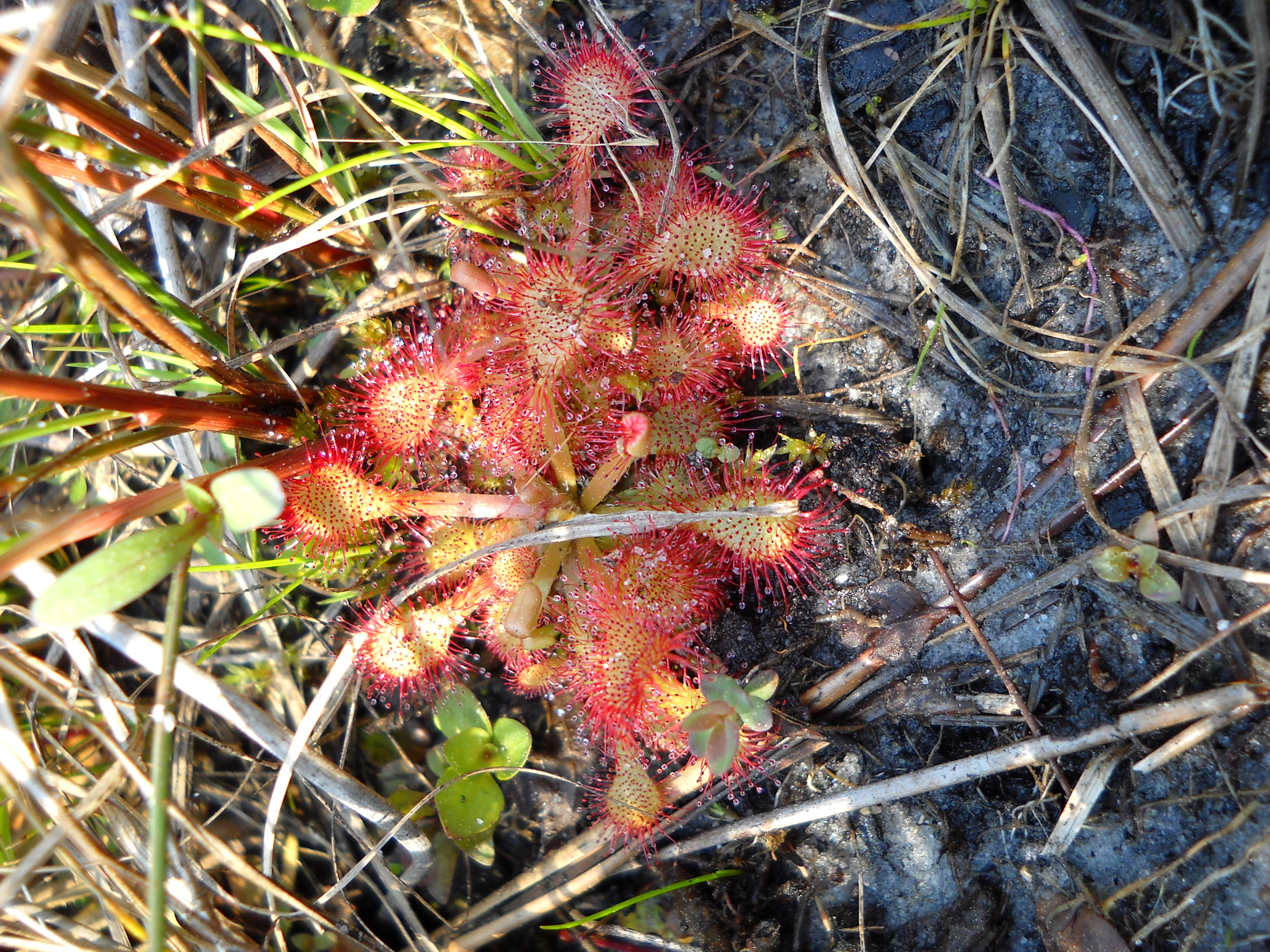
Sundew in Croatan Nation Forest

The Croatan National Forest lies completely within the Middle Atlantic coastal forests ecoregion. It is home to a huge variety of marine and terrestrial animals. Some of the wildlife that can be found include black bear, raccoon, squirrel, bobcat, river otter, muskrat, mink, a wide variety of reptiles and amphibians, as well as osprey, peregrine falcon, various species of owls, quail, bald eagle, wild turkey, and alligator. The forest is abundant with pine trees including virgin longleaf pine stands that remain untouched to this date. There are many hardwood areas including the cypress trees of the swamps. Carnivorous plants such as Venus flytraps, sundew, and pitcher plants may also be found. There are a few sandy areas within the forest that provide pristine habitat for the eastern diamondback rattlesnakes. The tannic-stained blackwater present throughout the forest also gives habitat to several unique species of fish who thrive in the forest's unique riverine conditions. Species such as bluespotted sunfish, mud sunfish, banded sunfish, eastern mudminnow, flier, warmouth, redfin pickerel, bowfin and yellow bullhead, among many others, are some of the most commonly encountered fish. The elusive swampfish, a species of cavefish, can also be found in several creeks and canals throughout the forest.

== Habitat ==
The Croatan National Forest offers a variety of habitats that provide excellent homes and safe havens for wildlife. There are many longleaf pine savannas that are vital to the red-cockaded woodpecker which can be found in abundance within these forests. Croatan is also the site of many nearly-impenetrable pocosin pine savannas, old growth beech and oak forests, saltwater estuaries, and bogs. Wetland swamps called pocosins are abundant in Croatan, giving their name to Pinus serotina.

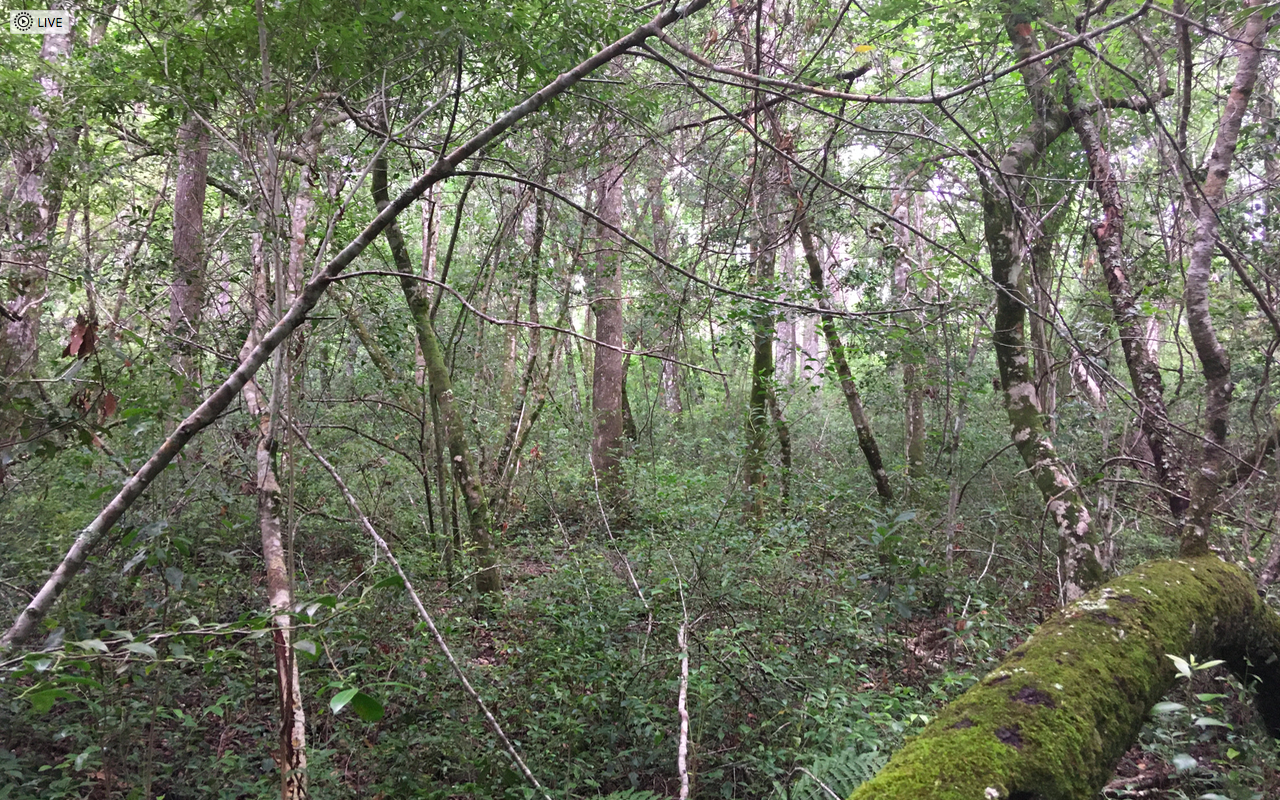
Forest scenery

== Wilderness areas ==
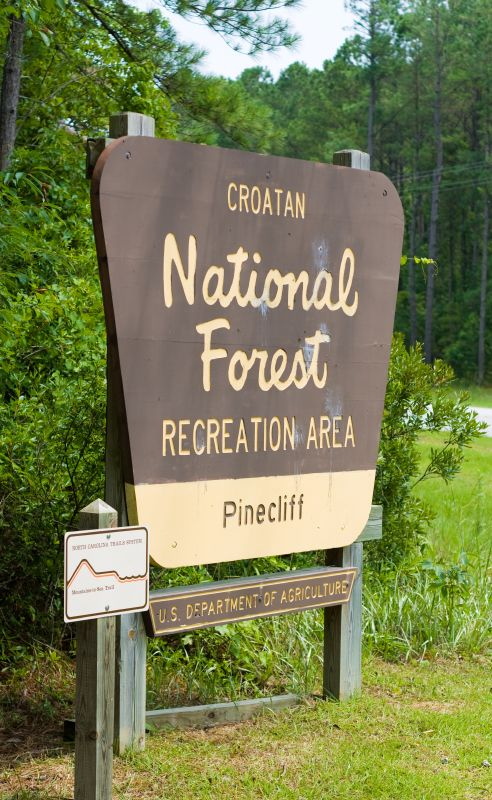
Entrance sign for the Pinecliff recreation area. A MST sign is nearby.

There are four officially designated wilderness areas lying within Croatan National Forest that are part of the National Wilderness Preservation System.

- Catfish Lake South Wilderness
- Pocosin Wilderness
- Pond Pine Wilderness
- Sheep Ridge Wilderness

== See also ==
- List of national forests of the United States
