= Interstate 42 (North Carolina) =

Partially completed Interstate Highway in North Carolina

Interstate 42
- I-42 highlighted in red; future segments in blue; unbuilt future segments in orange

Route information
- Maintained by NCDOT
- Length: 31.5 mi (50.7 km)
- Existed: September 16, 2024–present
- Tourist routes: Clayton Bypass Scenic Byway
- NHS: Entire route

Western segment
- Length: 9.8 mi (15.8 km)
- West end: I-40 / NC 540 near Garner
- East end: US 70 / US 70 Bus. near Clayton

Eastern segment
- Length: 21.7 mi (34.9 km)
- West end: US 70 in Goldsboro
- Major intersections: I-795 in Goldsboro; US 117 in Goldsboro; US 13 in Goldsboro
- East end: US 70 in La Grange

Location
- Country: United States
- State: North Carolina
- Counties: Wake, Johnston, Wayne, Lenoir

Highway system
- Interstate Highway System; Main; Auxiliary; Suffixed; Business; Future; North Carolina Highway System; Interstate; US; State; Scenic
← NC 41	→ NC 42

Interstate 42 (I-42) is a partially completed Interstate Highway in the US state of North Carolina, currently existing in two separate segments in the eastern part of the state, totaling 31.5 miles (50.7 km). The completed and signed segments of I-42 currently run from I-40 eastwards along the 9.8-mile (15.8 km) Clayton Bypass to an interchange with Business US 70 southeast of Clayton. The Interstate resumes again along the Goldsboro Bypass, running for 21.7 miles (34.9 km) north of Goldsboro, ending again at US 70. The Interstate eventually will run from I-40 to Morehead City, where it will terminate along the Northern Carteret Bypass, north of Beaufort. I-42 also overlaps the Clayton Bypass Scenic Byway, from I-40 to US 70 Bus.

== Route description ==
The Clayton Bypass is a four-lane freeway that is 9.8 miles (15.8 km) in length south of Clayton. Starting west of Clayton at a turbine interchange with I-40 and NC 540 on the Wake–Johnston county line, it continues southeast and has a 3-mile concurrency with NC 36, before reaching an interchange with US 70/US 70 Bus., where US 70 merges into the through traffic. Mile markers along the route are based on I-42 and the speed limit is 70 miles per hour (110 km/h) throughout.

The Goldsboro Bypass is a four-lane freeway that is 21.7 miles (34.9 km) in length north of Goldsboro, connecting with US 70 at both ends. Starting west of Goldsboro, it splits off from US 70, which continues on towards Goldsboro. In a northeasterly direction, it connects with NC 581, I-795 and US 117, where it turns southeasterly. After connecting with Wayne Memorial Drive, US 13, and Parkstown Road, it merges back as the through traffic with US 70 near La Grange. Mile markers along the route are based on I-42 and the speed limit is 70 miles per hour (110 km/h) throughout. The bypass serves both as a strategic transportation corridor for North Carolina and part of the Strategic Highway Network (STRAHNET).

== History ==
A multi-county project, also known as the "US 70 Corridor" or "Super 70", is a collection of several projects along US 70 to improve passenger and freight movement eventually leading to the establishment of Interstate 42 (I-42), which is the US Department of Transportation's High Priority Corridor #82 from the Intermodal Surface Transportation Efficiency Act (ISTEA) of 1991. The Fixing America's Surface Transportation Act (FAST Act), signed by then President Barack Obama on December 14, 2015, added the US 70 corridor between Garner and Morehead City to the Interstate system as a future Interstate. Justification for the designation included better connections with Seymour Johnson Air Force Base, the North Carolina Global Transpark, Marine Corps Air Station Cherry Point, and the Port of Morehead City with the rest of state and the eastern seaboard. With no specified number codified in the act, the Regional Transportation Alliance (RTA) expected this corridor to be designated Interstate 46 (I-46) or another suitable designation, and the US Highway 70 Corridor Commission recommended Interstate 50 (I-50). On March 30, 2016, Governor Pat McCrory and various officials unveiled "Future Interstate" signage along the corridor.

For the spring 2016 AASHTO Special Committee on U.S. Route Numbering, NCDOT proposed Interstate 36 (I-36) for this route since there were no other routes with that number in the state. However, on May 24, 2016, AASHTO assigned Interstate 42 for the route. The entire project has a budgeted cost (as of late 2018) of about $1.3 billion, and about 29 miles still without a budget. Some projects like the Clayton and Goldsboro bypasses are completed, while others have yet to be scheduled.

In October 2021, AASHTO approved two segments of I-42, the 10-mile (16 km) Clayton Bypass and the 21.7-mile (34.9 km) Goldsboro Bypass; this was followed by the Federal Highway Administration subsequent approval in March 2022. In May 2022, AASHTO also approved the elimination of US 70 Bypass, clearing the way for NCDOT to fully redesignate the route. Signage for the route was expected to be put up later in 2022, but took a few years to take place, with signage going up in the later part of 2024. In July 2023, NCDOT announced that they were proposing to renumber NC 42 to NC 36 (which was the number originally suggested for the new interstate before 42 was chosen) between NC 50 and U.S. Route 70 Business (US 70 Bus) in Clayton in order to avoid confusing motorist when the Clayton bypass is designated as I-42. Once I-42 is fully completed on the Clayton Bypass and the project with nearby NC 540 is completed, US 70 will be rerouted onto its old routing through Clayton, which is currently designated as US 70 Bus. NCDOT requested public input on this proposal at an open house on October 12, 2023. US 70 has also been upgraded to interstate highway standards between Dover and New Bern, but this cannot be signed as I-42 until the Kinston Bypass is completed as this segment is not connected to the Interstate highway system. I-42 signage began being installed on September 16, 2024, on the Goldsboro Bypass, marking its establishment. Additionally, signage for I-42 has been installed on overhead signs at its western terminus, with the signing of the Clayton Bypass itself completed in 2025. I-42 is expected to be completed in its entirety by 2032 and will include the installation of broadband fiber along the entire route.

=== Clayton Bypass ===
On June 9, 2008, the Clayton Bypass opened, redirecting US 70 onto I-40 between exits 306 to 309 and then on a new 10.7-mile (17.2 km) four-lane freeway bypass south of Clayton. Planning for the bypass began in 1991, but construction did not start until 2005 because of several delays regarding the dwarf wedgemussel, an endangered species, habitat in the area. Originally scheduled for completion in June 2009, a severe drought in 2007–2008 allowed construction to proceed more rapidly than anticipated. NCDOT was given the approval by AASHTO to officially designate US 70 along the bypass on May 6, 2008, with the former alignment becoming an extension of US 70 Bus. Compared to the former alignment through Clayton, the bypass is estimated to cut fifteen minutes of travel time for drivers traveling between Raleigh and eastern North Carolina.

In November 2023, AASHTO approved the eliminating part of US 70 Bus., between Garner and Clayton, and rerouted mainline US 70 off the Clayton Bypass and back along its former alignment through there. I-42 had been designated on the Clayton Bypass in 2022, although it was not fully signed as such until 2025.

=== Goldsboro Bypass ===
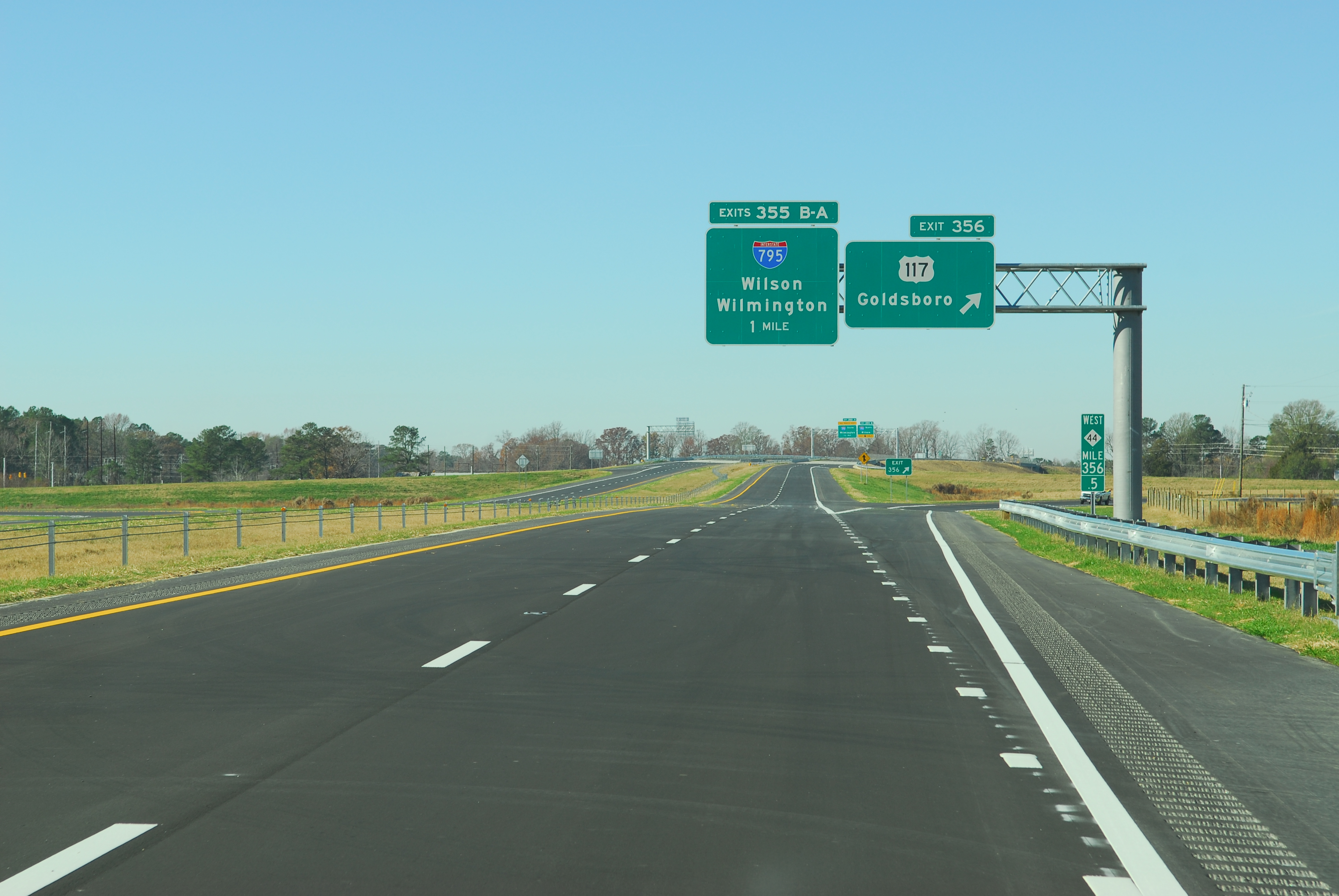
Westbound NC 44, now I-42, approaching US 117 in December 2011

North Carolina Highway 44
- Location: Goldsboro
- Length: 9.8 mi (15.8 km)
- Existed: December 16, 2011–May 27, 2016

U.S. Highway 70 Bypass
- Location: Goldsboro–La Grange
- Length: 21.7 mi (34.9 km)
- Existed: May 27, 2016–September 16, 2024

Construction started on the 3.9-mile (6.3 km) central section of the Goldsboro Bypass on October 9, 2008; its contract was awarded to Barnhill Contracting Co. of Tarboro. At a cost of $65.5 million (equivalent to $89.8 million in 2024), it features three interchanges connecting I-795, US 117 and Wayne Memorial Drive (SR 1556). On December 16, 2011, the central section became the first segment of the Goldsboro Bypass to open; signed as NC 44.

In 2012, both eastern and western sections of the bypass began construction. The 12.5-mile (20.1 km) eastern section's contract was awarded to Barnhill Contracting Co. in February, at a cost of $104.4 million (equivalent to $141 million in 2024). The 5.9-mile (9.5 km) western section's contract was awarded to S.T. Wooten in July, at a cost of $62.4 million (equivalent to $84 million in 2024). On September 25, 2015, the American Association of State Highway and Transportation Officials (AASHTO) approved the establishment of US 70 Byp., dependent on the completion of the Goldsboro Bypass. On October 17, 2015, the western section became the second segment to open; connecting US 70 and I-795, with an interchange at NC 581.

The eastern or last section of the Goldsboro Bypass was opened on May 27, 2016; from Wayne Memorial Drive (SR 1556) to US 70, with interchanges at US 13 and Parkstown Road (SR 1714). The section opened with a ribbon cutting ceremony and all signage that formally delineate NC 44 would be changed to US 70 Byp. after the event.

On June 5, 2021, a 5-mile (8.0 km) section was dedicated to former Goldsboro Mayor Chuck Allen.

In May 2022, US 70 Bypass was replaced by I-42; I-42 signage replaced US 70 Bypass signage in fall 2024.

== Future ==
=== Wilson's Mills improvements ===
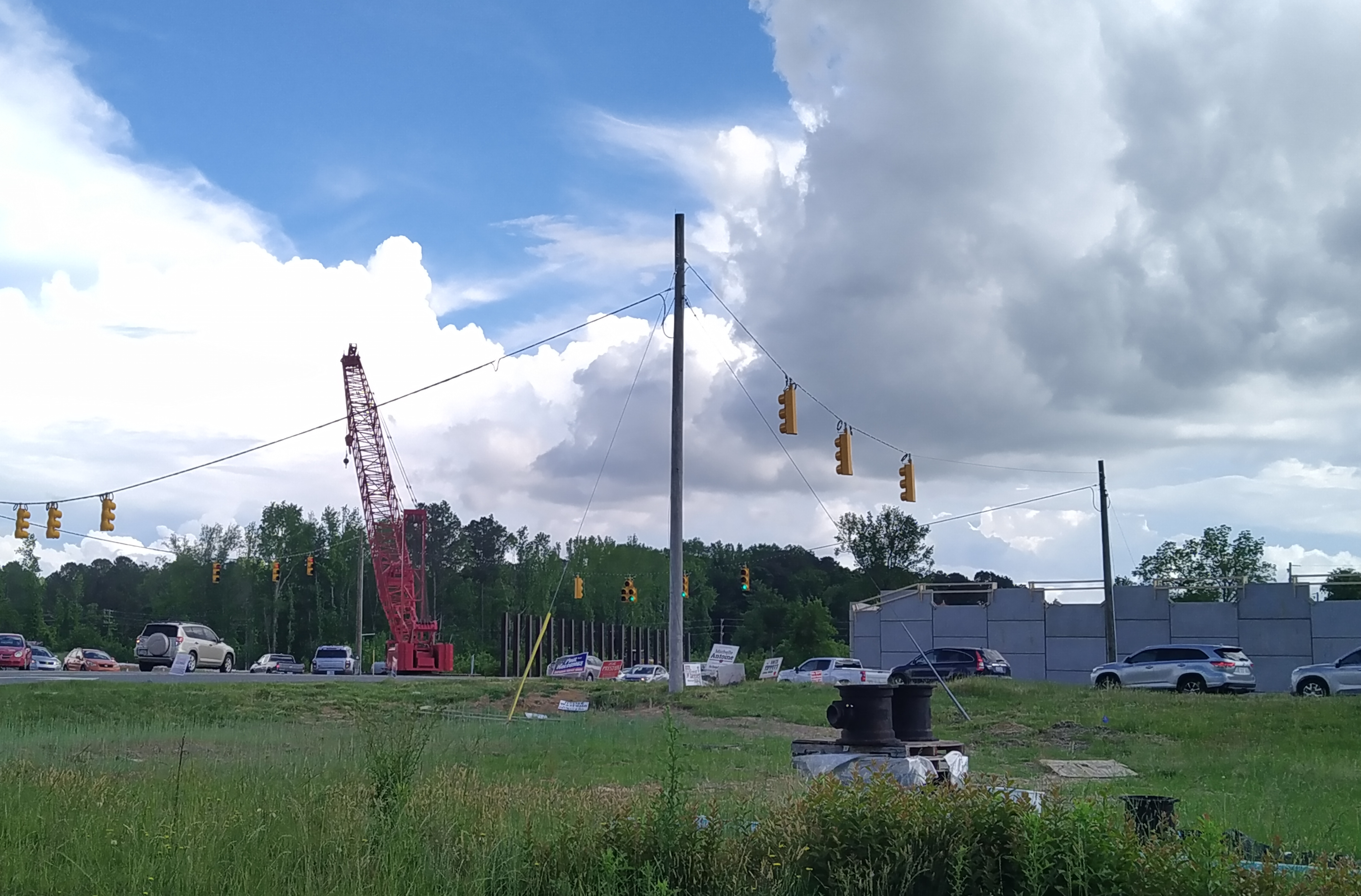
Overpass construction at Wilson's Mills Road, May 2022

A 5-mile (8.0 km) section of US 70 at Wilson's Mills, connecting to the Clayton Bypass in the west will be upgraded to a freeway for an estimated $31 million. The plan calls for US 70 to be carried on a bridge over Wilson Mills Road while a bridge will carry Swift Creek Road over US 70. Interchanges will be made at both roads and a connector road paralleling US 70 between the two roads will also be built. Construction was planned to begin in 2020 and finish around 2022. However, COVID-19 funding issues postponed the awarding of the construction contract from September 2020 to March 2021. Construction officially began on May 12, 2021, and was expected to be completed by the middle of fall 2024. The Swift Creek Road exit was partially opened to traffic in spring 2024. After some further delays due to drainage issues along the segment, the project was officially completed on December 17, 2025, after all the "Speed Limit 70" signs were added. I-42 signage will be added once it is approved by the FHWA.

=== Smithfield/Selma improvements ===
Improvements are in the planning stages for the 13.8-mile (22.2 km) segment of US 70 between Wilson's Mills and Princeton. Some of this section is already a freeway but will require improvements to bring it up to interstate standards and add an interchange with I-95. Adding the interchange will require shifting I-95, which is going to be widened in this area, 2,000 feet (610 m) east to incorporate the new changes. This proposed project is still in the study phase and not currently budgeted nor does it have a timeline for completion. I-95 and US 70 Business Route (exit 95) is being reconstructed though.

=== Princeton Bypass to Goldsboro Bypass ===
The existing Princeton Bypass eastward to the Goldsboro Bypass will be improved to interstate standards, which is estimated to cost $170 million. The 6.7-mile (10.8 km) project for the upgrade of US 70 will be done in two parts: the first will be in the Princeton area between US 70A to North Pearl Street/Edwards Roads (construction is scheduled to start in 2025) with second part starting there and ending at the Goldsboro Bypass (construction is scheduled to start in 2028). Currently, project funding has been suspended by NCDOT due to the agency's budget issues. The agency is currently working with state legislators to find alternative sources of revenue.

=== Kinston Bypass ===
The Kinston Bypass is a project that has been in the planning stages since the 1990s. The project was put on hold until 2007 when NCDOT revitalized the project. While several northern bypasses were planned, in January 2014, the northern bypasses were removed in favor of a southern alternative, but the project was defunded in 2014 with the release of the 2015–2024 State Transportation Improvement Plan, and studies were suspended. In June 2022, NCDOT announced that they had chosen Alternative 1SB for the Kinston Bypass. This alternative would be approximately 21 miles (34 km) of a four-lane, median divided freeway accessible via ramps at 10 interchanges. Part of the project will also build service roads along the freeway as well as approximately 6.5 miles (10.5 km) of new roadway that will be south of the current US 70 alignment in the Kinston area. When complete, the bypass would improve regional mobility, connectivity, and capacity for US 70, reducing traffic congestion and delays that exist along US 70 between La Grange and Dover. The westernmost section, which is approximately 2.8 miles (4.5 km) and includes the interchange at Jim Sutton Road/Willie Measley Road, was included in NCDOT 2018-2027 State Transportation Improvement, which allowed preliminary engineering activities to resume. The four remaining sections east of this section were reinserted into 2024-2033 STIP Projects Map. However, as of 2023, no funding has been set aside for the project, which is expected to cost $716.2 million. Additionally, the easternmost interchange between US 70/Future I-42 and Caswell Station Road/Wyse Fork Road east of Kinston currently faces local opposition due to it impacting part of the land where the Battle of Wyse Fork was fought during the American Civil War.

=== James City freeway ===
In James City, a 5.1-mile (8.2 km) segment of the US 70 improvement project will upgrade the existing highway to freeway standards by elevating it over existing surface streets as a six-lane, median divided freeway, improving the frontage roads, removing 49 businesses and 17 homes, converting the five intersections along this segment to interchanges with all but one of them being dogbones (the other will be a parclo), and eliminating a railroad crossing just south of exit 417. The project, which is projected to cost $66 million, will connect to the existing US 70 freeway in New Bern. Construction was scheduled to begin in early 2020 and be complete in early 2024. However, the design-build project did not start until January 2021 and its completion was delayed by a year to the end of 2024. Construction on the project finally began in spring 2022 and as of February 2023, the project is about 1/3 completed. However, its completion was delayed again, this time to the middle of 2025. It is now expected to be completed in late-2027.

=== James City to Havelock ===
Between James City and Havelock, a 6.4-mile (10.3 km) section of US 70 will be converted to interstate standards. The final cost of the project is estimated to be $275.161 million with $147 million coming from a federal grant the state received in 2018. This segment will be a four-lane, median divided freeway accessible via ramps at three interchanges. With the release of the 2020 draft STIP, it was revealed that NCDOT was attempting to start construction in 2020, but this was delayed several times due to design and funding issues before a $242.35 million design-build contract for construction was finally awarded to Balfour Beatty in February 2023. Right-of-way acquisition will begin in fall 2023 with construction beginning in spring 2024. Completion is set for summer 2028.

=== Havelock Bypass ===
The Havelock Bypass is a 10.1-mile (16.3 km) four-lane freeway intended to improve existing sections of US 70 and a bypass west of Havelock, through the Croatan National Forest. The routing through Havelock became US 70 Bus. Draft and environmental studies began in September 2011 and were completed in January 2016. Property acquisition started in 2016, with construction expected to begin in February 2019 and be completed in 2022 at an estimated cost of $173 million. However, construction did not officially begin until August 2019 and with its completion set for May 2024; it was later changed to late-summer 2024. Since that time, the completion was pushed out to fall 2025 due to weather delays, although the US 70 east overpass at the east end of the bypass was opened to traffic on June 20, 2024. According to Balfour Beatty, the project includes the construction of 15 bridges, which will require around 4.43 million cubic meters of borrow material and 288,000 tonnes of asphalt. The bypass opened to traffic on December 19, 2025, although construction will not be completed until late-2026.

=== Havelock Bypass to Morehead City ===
The Newport River Bridge will be reconfigured from two-lanes to four-lanes.

==== Northern Carteret Bypass ====
According to the Comprehensive Transportation Plans from Carteret and Craven counties, I-42 is proposed to be routed on a new alignment which will be called the Northern Carteret Bypass. It will pass north of Morehead City before curving back south and terminating at US 70 north of Beaufort. This was further confirmed when the ECC (Eastern Carolina Council) noted that I-42 would likely be built to bypass Morehead City to the north due to the inability to build it through the city itself. However, no funding has been provided for this bypass as of 2024.

== Exit list ==
County	Location	mi	km	Old exit	New exit	Destinations	Notes
Wake		0.00	0.00	318	1	I-40 / NC 540 Toll west (Triangle Expressway) – Wilmington, Raleigh	Western terminus of I-42
Johnston		3.8	6.1	320	4	NC 36 west (Veterans Parkway) – Fuquay-Varina	Western end of NC 36 overlap
Johnston		6.6	10.6	323	7	NC 36 east (Ranch Road) – Clayton	Eastern end of NC 36 overlap
Johnston		9.8	15.8	326	10	US 70 Bus. east – Smithfield US 70 west – Clayton	Signed as 10A (Bus. US 70 east) and 10B (US 70 west) westbound
Johnston		9.8	15.8	Route transition from I-42 to Future I-42			
Johnston	Wilson's Mills			329	13	Swift Creek Road	Existing interchanges of US 70
Johnston	Wilson's Mills			330	14	Wilson's Mills Road	Existing interchanges of US 70
Johnston				333	17	Buffalo Road	Existing interchanges of US 70
Johnston				334	18	US 70 east – Goldsboro	Existing interchanges of US 70
Johnston	Selma				19	I-95 – Benson, Wilson	Proposed interchange (unfunded)
Johnston				336	20	US 70 west – Raleigh	Existing interchanges of US 70
Johnston				337	21	US 70 Bus. west – Smithfield	Existing interchanges of US 70
Johnston				338	22	Stevens Chapel Road/Davis Mill Road	Existing interchanges of US 70
Johnston						US 70A west – Pine Level	Future interchanges (Princeton project, unfunded)
Johnston	Princeton					N. Pearl Street/Edwards Road	Future interchanges (Princeton project, unfunded)
Wayne						Capps Bridge Road/Ebenezer Church Road	Future interchanges (Princeton project, unfunded)
Wayne	Goldsboro	34	55	Route transition from Future I-42 to I-42			
Wayne	Goldsboro	34	55	350	34	US 70 east – Goldsboro	Eastbound exit and westbound entrance
Wayne	Goldsboro	34.6	55.7	351	35	NC 581	
Wayne	Goldsboro	39.3	63.2	355	39	I-795 south to US 117 south – Goldsboro, Wilmington I-795 north – Wilson	Signed as exit 39A (south) and 39B (north)
Wayne	Goldsboro	40.1	64.5	356	40	US 117 – Goldsboro	
Wayne		42.4	68.2	358	42	Wayne Memorial Drive	
Wayne		44.6	71.8	361	44	US 13 – Goldsboro, Greenville	
Wayne		47.7	76.8	364	47	Parkstown Road	
Lenoir		53.7	86.4	369	53	US 70 west – Goldsboro	Westbound exit and eastbound entrance
Lenoir		53.7	86.4	Route transition from I-42 to Future I-42			
Lenoir	La Grange			372	56	NC 903 – La Grange	Existing interchange of US 70
Lenoir	La Grange					Willie Measley/Jim Sutton Road	Future interchanges (Kinston bypass project, unfunded)
Lenoir						Albert Sugg Road/Barwick Station Road	Future interchanges (Kinston bypass project, unfunded)
Lenoir	Kinston					NC 148	Future interchanges (Kinston bypass project, unfunded)
Lenoir	Kinston					US 70 Bus. east to US 258 – Kinston	Future interchanges (Kinston bypass project, unfunded)
Lenoir	Kinston					NC 11 / NC 55 – Pink Hill, Mount Olive	Future interchanges (Kinston bypass project, unfunded)
Lenoir	Kinston					US 258 (South Queen Street) – Snow Hill, Kinston	Future interchanges (Kinston bypass project, unfunded)
Lenoir	Kinston					NC 58 (Trenton Highway) – Trenton	Future interchanges (Kinston bypass project, unfunded)
Lenoir	Kinston					US 70 Bus. west to US 258 – Kinston	Future interchanges (Kinston bypass project, unfunded)
Jones						Wyse Fork Road/Caswell Station Road	
Jones						Dover Road (Old US Route 70) - Dover	
Craven					84	NC 41 south (Trenton Road) – Cove City, Trenton	Existing interchanges of US 70
Craven					90	Tuscarora Rhems Road – Tuscarora	Existing interchanges of US 70
Craven				409	93	Clark Road	Existing interchanges of US 70
Craven				410A	94	US 17 south – Jacksonville	Existing interchanges of US 70
Craven				411	95	NC 43 north – Greenville, Vanceboro	Existing interchanges of US 70
Craven	New Bern				97	Glenburnie Road – Craven Community College	Existing interchanges of US 70
Craven	New Bern			414	98	US 17 Bus. – New Bern, Jacksonville	Existing interchanges of US 70
Craven	New Bern			416	100	NC 55 west / Pembroke Road – Trent Woods	Existing interchanges of US 70
Craven	Trent River			Freedom Memorial Bridge			
Craven	James City			417	101	US 17 north / NC 55 east – Bayboro, Washington E. Front St – New Bern	Existing interchange of US 70, will be signed as 101A (Front Street) and 101B (US 17/NC 55)
Craven	James City			418	102	Williams Road	Future interchanges (James City project, funded, under construction; completion late-2027)
Craven	James City			419	103	Airport Road	Future interchanges (James City project, funded, under construction; completion late-2027)
Craven	James City			420	104	Grantham Road	Future interchanges (James City project, funded, under construction; completion late-2027)
Craven	James City			421	105	Taberna Way	Future interchanges (James City project, funded, under construction; completion late-2027)
Craven	James City			422	106	Thurman Road	Future interchanges (James City project, funded, under construction; completion late-2027)
Craven	James City			424	108	Camp Kiro Road	Future interchanges (East Havelock bypass project, funded, under construction; completion summer 2028)
Craven	Croatan			426	110	Fisher Avenue/Fisher Road	Future interchanges (East Havelock bypass project, funded, under construction; completion summer 2028)
Craven	Neuse Forest			428	112	Stately Pines Road	Future interchanges (East Havelock bypass project, funded, under construction; completion summer 2028)
Craven	Havelock			429	113	US 70 Bus. east	Existing interchanges of US 70
Craven	Havelock			434	118	Lake Road	Existing interchanges of US 70
Craven	Havelock			437	121	US 70 Bus. west	Existing interchanges of US 70
1.000 mi = 1.609 km; 1.000 km = 0.621 mi: Incomplete access; Route transition; Unopened
