= U.S. Route 70 in North Carolina =

Highway in North Carolina

U.S. Highway 70
- Route of US 70 in North Carolina highlighted in red

Route information
- Maintained by NCDOT
- Length: 488 mi (785 km)
- Existed: November 11, 1926–present
- Tourist routes: Appalachian Medley; Outer Banks Scenic Byway

Major junctions
- West end: US 25 / US 70 at the Tennessee state line near Paint Rock
- I-26 / I-240 in Asheville; I-77 in Statesville; I-74 in High Point; I-73 / US 421 in Greensboro; I-40 in Greensboro; I-85 / I-885 in Durham; I-540 near Raleigh; I-40 / US 64 in Raleigh; I-40 near Garner; I-95 near Selma
- East end: School Drive in Atlantic

Location
- Country: United States
- State: North Carolina
- Counties: Madison, Buncombe, McDowell, Burke, Catawba, Iredell, Rowan, Davidson, Guilford, Alamance, Orange, Durham, Wake, Johnston, Wayne, Lenoir, Jones, Craven, Carteret

Highway system
- United States Numbered Highway System; List; Special; Divided; North Carolina Highway System; Interstate; US; State; Scenic
← NC 69	→ NC 71

U.S. Route 70 (US 70) is a part of the United States Numbered Highway System that runs from Globe, Arizona, to the Crystal Coast of the US state of North Carolina. In North Carolina, it is a major 488-mile-long (785 km) east–west highway that runs from the Tennessee border to the Atlantic Ocean. From the Tennessee state line near Paint Rock to Asheville it follows the historic Dixie Highway, running concurrently with US 25. The highway connects several major cities including Asheville, High Point, Greensboro, Durham, Raleigh, Goldsboro, and New Bern. From Beaufort on east, US 70 shares part of the Outer Banks Scenic Byway, a National Scenic Byway, before ending in the community of Atlantic, located along Core Sound.

US 70 is an original US Highway, signed on November 11, 1926, when the US Highway System was approved. Since then, the highway has been realigned in places. One of the larger extensions of US 70 came in 1931 when the highway was extended concurrently along North Carolina Highway 101 (NC 101) from Beaufort to Atlantic. There are four-lane highways throughout much of the state, and notable sections of US 70 have been converted to freeway or expressway standards, including those in Greensboro, Clayton, and New Bern. Several new projects beginning in the 2000s have placed US 70 on interstate grade freeways. On May 24, 2016, AASHTO assigned the Future I-42 designation to the majority of US 70's routing east of Garner. Additionally, a short freeway segment in east Durham was officially designated as I-885 on June 30, 2022, a route that connects I-40 to I-85 through the Research Triangle Park and east Durham.

== Route description ==
US 70 travels through several diverse regions in North Carolina, including the Bald and Black Mountains of Western North Carolina, the rural Foothills, the urban Piedmont, the farmlands of the Inner Banks, and the coastal communities of the Crystal Coast. All of US 70 east of Durham, and smaller segments including Statesville to Salisbury and Lexington to Greensboro, are listed in the National Highway System, a network of roads important to the country's economy, defense, and mobility. US 70 also overlaps the Appalachian Medley, from Hot Springs to Walnut.

=== Western Mountains and Foothills ===
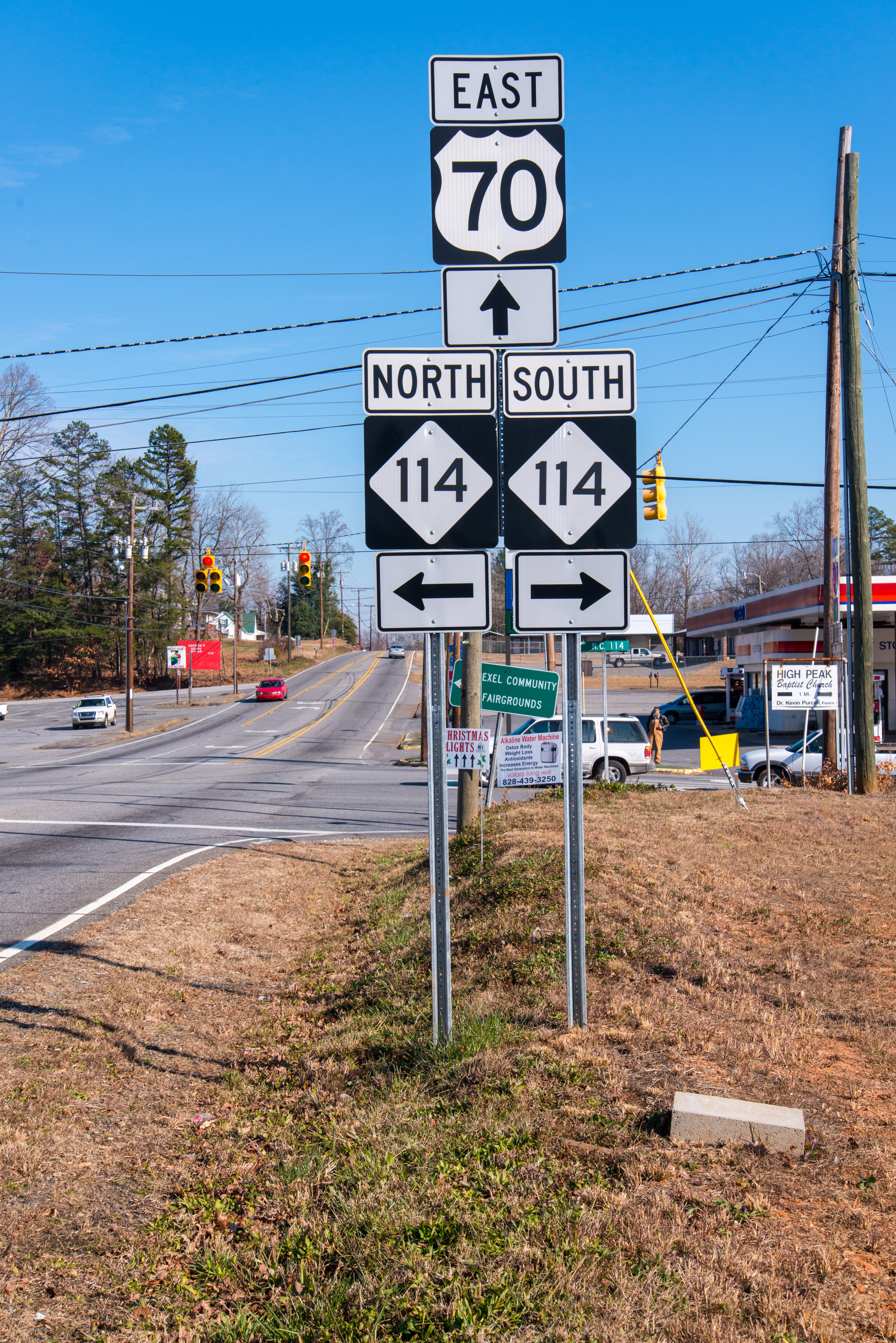
US 70-NC 114 in Drexel in 2013

US 70, in concurrency with US 25, enters from Tennessee as a two-lane mountain highway meandering through the Bald Mountains. In Hot Springs it crosses the French Broad River and the Appalachian Trail, then goes northeasterly through Tanyard Gap to Hurricane. Proceeding south, it goes through the Walnut Mountains and then joins NC 213 near Walnut. Continuing on a more southeasterly routing, it becomes the US 25 Bus./US 70 Bus. split-off towards downtown Marshall at Mashburn Gap. At the Hayes Run Road interchange, NC 213 splits and continues towards Mars Hill. Before US 25 Bus./US 70 Bus. rejoins at Ivy River Road, the highway widens to four lanes; afterwards, it follows along Ivy Creek before crossing the Madison/Buncombe county line.

In Weaverville, US 25/US 70 joins Future I-26/US 19/US 23 (exit 19), then continues south on the Morris L. McGough Freeway to Asheville. US 25 separates at Merrimon Avenue (exit 23), continuing solo into downtown Asheville. At the Patton Avenue interchange, US 70 switches to an I-240/US 74A concurrency as it goes east along the Billy Graham Freeway. At Charlotte Avenue (exit 5B), US 70/US 74A splits from I-240 before it goes through the Beaucatcher Cut. At College Street, which changes into Tunnel Road, US 70/US 74A passes through Beaucatcher Tunnel (built in 1927). On the eastern side of Beaucatcher Mountain, US 70/US ;74A goes through a commercial corridor that leads to Asheville Mall, where US 74A splits and continues along South Tunnel Road and connects with I-240 at a unique three-level diamond interchange. In the East Asheville area is the historic Oteen Veterans Administration Hospital Historic District as well as the Blue Ridge Parkway. At Jones Mountain, US 70 leaves the Asheville city limits and begins its parallel north of I-40, as it goes through Swannanoa and Black Mountain. At Ridgecrest, US 70 merges with I-40 (exit 65). At Swannanoa Gap it crosses the Eastern Continental Divide (elevation 2,786 feet (849 m)) and enters McDowell County.

At the top of the gap, in addition to a reduced speed limit there is a truck information station that requires all trucks to go through before continuing. The following 5-mile (8.0 km) descent is a 6% grade along Youngs Ridge to Old Fort, along which are several reduce-speed warning lights and three runaway truck ramps. It is likely that, on both on the ascent and the descent, most trucks and some cars will be going slower than posted speed limits, and that, despite the fact that this section is six lanes wide, slower vehicles may be traveling in the passing lanes. At Old Fort, US 70 splits from I-40 (at exit 72) and travels through the downtown area and by the Mountain Gateway Museum and Heritage Center. East of Old Fort, US 70 travels northeasterly towards Marion and forms the southern boundary of the Pisgah National Forest. At Pleasant Gardens, it connects with NC 80, which travelers can follow towards Mount Mitchell, the highest peak east of the Mississippi River. Crossing the Catawba River and entering Marion, US 70 connects with US 221/NC 226 and then forms a short concurrency with US 221 Bus. along Main Street. East of Marion, US 70 connects with NC 126 in Nebo, where travelers can visit Lake James State Park.

Entering Burke County near Bridgewater, US 70 passes through Glen Alpine and then enters Morganton, where it forms a brief concurrency with US 64 as it proceeds along Fleming Drive, while US 70 Bus. passes through the downtown area. Continuing east, it goes through the towns of Drexel, Valdese, Rutherford College, Connelly Springs and Hildebran before crossing into Catawba County at Long View. In Hickory, US 70 serves as the town's commercial corridor as US 321 Bus. begins its concurrency at the US 321 interchange. In Conover, US 321 Bus. turns at Northwest Boulevard towards Newton and then crosses NC 16. Continuing east through Claremont and Catawba, US 70 crosses the Catawba River for the second time and enters Iredell County.

=== Piedmont ===
After passing through Celeste Hinkle and by the Statesville Regional Airport, US 70 enters the city limits of Statesville and connects with US 64/NC 90 at the intersection of Newton Drive and Garner Bagnal Boulevard. Passing south of the downtown area, it begins to parallel the Norfolk Southern Railway south to Salisbury. Crossing US 21 at Shelton Avenue and I-77 (exit 49A), it leaves Statesville and proceeds southeasterly along Statesville Boulevard, also known as the Jim Graham Highway, through an area of farmland and factories that are wedged between the four-lane highway and the railway. After crossing into Rowan County, US 70 goes through Cleveland and shares a short concurrency with NC 801 near Barber before entering Salisbury. On Jake Alexander Boulevard, US 70 shares a concurrency with US 601 until the Rowan Mills area, where it switches onto Main Street with US 29 and later NC 150. Traveling northeasterly through downtown Salisbury, it then goes by the North Carolina Transportation Museum before passing through Spencer. At the Yadkin River, the four-lane highway reduces to two-lanes as it crosses over into Davidson County. Adjacent to the bridge over which US 29/US 70/NC 150 travels are the Wil-Cox Bridge, a concrete arch pedestrian bridge, and two North Carolina Railroad (NCRR) Warren truss bridges.

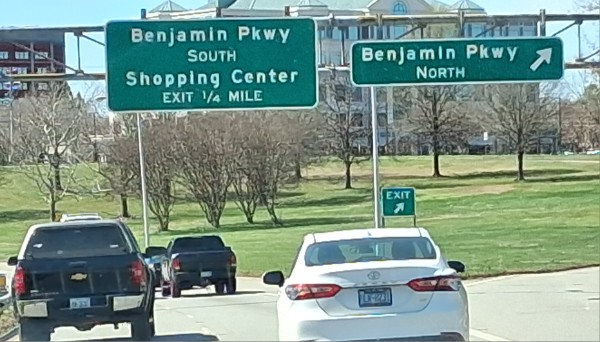
Wendover Avenue (US 70) in the outskirts of Downtown Greensboro.

At 1.16 miles (1.87 km) from the Yadkin River, NC 150 splits towards Churchland while US 29/US 70 merges with I-85/US 52 (at exit 84). After a 4.31-mile (6.94 km) concurrency, I-85 splits off and continues towards Greensboro, and I-285 begins (at exit 87). Entering the Lexington city limits, additional route changes occur; I-285/US 52 departs (at exit 87) towards Winston-Salem, and US 64 merges from Mocksville. After skirting north of downtown Lexington, US 64 departs again towards Asheboro, with US 70 continuing northeast alongside the four-lane expressway. While in Thomasville, it exits off the expressway with the diamond exit with NC 68. Now concurrent with said route, the concurrent loops exit the western "half" of North Carolina, in which the two routes encircles the center of Downtown High Point in the blend of boulevard and expressway grade, before coming to the exit with I-74. US 70 continues into the northern outskirts of High Point, where NC 68 diverges to the north at an at-grade junction with Wendover Avenue. US 70 continues northeast along Wendover Avenue, before entering into the northern outskirts of Jamestown. The corridor comes to the exits with Guilford College Road and the Greensboro Urban Loop (I-73/US 421), while heading to the city limits of Greensboro, where it temporarily becomes a boulevard. The route enters into the surrounding commercial retail district, where it comes to an exit with I-40. Wendover Avenue comes to an at-grade junction with Clifton Road, before it becomes a freeway with six overall lanes. The route comes to the exits with Spring Garden Street and Holden Street, before entering into the northern outskirts of Downtown Greensboro. While inside downtown, it comes to the exit with Market Street, before coming to Friendly Avenue and Benjamin Parkway, which gives direct access to the Friendly Center. After coming to the exit with Westover Terrace, it comes to junction with Battleground Avenue which carries US 220, before the freeway downgrades to partial expressway. It is in this vicinity, where US 70 and US 220 travels concurrently onto the partial-expressway, with the exits with Yanceyville Street and Summit Avenue. The corridor comes to a junction with O'Henry Boulevard (US 29), where US 220 leaves O'Henry Boulevard to join with US 70. Wendover Avenue crosses the Huffine Mill Road exit, comes to the junction with Penny Road, before the Wendover Avenue designation terminates at an at-grade junction with Burlington Road. It comes to a junction with I-785 and I-840, where the route enters into McLeansville, downgrading to a non-median arterial road. The road continues with the designated name, the Charlotte Hawkins Brown Memorial Highway, where it enters into the eastern "half" of North Carolina. US 70 connects to Sedalia and Gibsonville, among other, alongside the Rock Creek and Stoney Creek centers in Whitsett; east of Whitsett, it enters Alamance County.

With the corridor traveling south of central Elon, US 70 travel on Church St, a four lane retail corridor, as it enters city limits of Burlington. It connects with NC 87 and NC 100 as well as NC 62 as it enters downtown Burlington. Sharing a brief concurrency with NC 62 through the downtown area, it then proceeds southeasterly to Haw River. As it nears the town of Haw River, it then goes northeasterly again to bypass the town and crosses over the Haw River via Three Governors Bridge; heading easterly again, the highway drops back to two lanes after connecting with NC 49. At Mebane, US 70 crosses into Orange County. Passing through the communities of Miles and Efland, and parallels the NCRR railroad just to the north, US 70 makes a unique median divide in Duke Forest to merge with the I-85 Connector (SR 1239); constructed in the mid-1950s when US 70 was rerouted here onto what is now I-40/I-85. Crossing the Eno River, US 70 passes along the northern edge of Hillsborough, while US 70 Bus. goes through its downtown area. Crossing the Eno River again, it borders along the Eno River State Park, while traveling through another area of the Duke Forest. At Eno, US 70 merges onto I-85 (exit 170), while US 70 Bus. continues along its former alignment to Bennett Place.

Entering both Durham and Durham County, I-85/US 70 maintains an east–west routing north of the downtown area, along a stretch of highway dedicated to Dr. John H. Franklin. At exit 174A US 15/US 501 join the freeway; at exit 176B US 501 departs and continues north along Duke Street. US 70 leaves I-85/US 15 at exit 178, and forms a concurrency with I-885, which begins at the interchange. I-85 and US 15 continue north toward Oxford and Petersburg. Traveling on a southeasterly direction along four-lane freeway in East Durham, it has interchanges with US 70 Bus./ NC 98 and Carr Drive. Soon after I-885 departs from the route to head toward I-40, US 70 downgrades to an expressway. At Bethesda, Miami Boulevard (SR 1959) continues south into the Research Triangle Park, while US 70 enters Wake County along New Raleigh Highway.

After crossing Raleigh city limits, US 70, here called Glenwood Avenue, makes a connection with I-540 (exit 292), which goes to the front entrance of RDU Airport; the following Lumley Road/Westgate Road interchange (at exit 293) goes to the North Cargo and General Aviation area of RDU Airport. Adjacent to the airport is William B. Umstead State Park. With NC 50 joining US 70 at Creedmoor Road, US 70 crosses under I-440/US 1 after passing by Crabtree Valley Mall. Inside the Raleigh Beltline, US 70/NC 50 travel through a residential area until Wade Avenue, where they join US 401 along Capital Boulevard. In the downtown area, Capital Boulevard splits into Dawson and McDowell Streets; various sites are adjacent or nearby, including the North Carolina Museum of Natural Sciences and North Carolina Museum of History (via Jones Street), the North Carolina State Capitol (via Morgan Street), the Raleigh Convention Center, the Red Hat Amphitheater, and the Duke Energy Center for the Performing Arts (via South Street). Leaving the downtown area after the Martin Luther King Jr. Boulevard/Western Boulevard interchange, Dawson–McDowell Streets merge and become Saunders Street, which promptly exits the Raleigh Beltline crossing under I-40/US 64. In Garner, US 401 departs along Fayetteville Street towards Fuquay-Varina, followed by NC 50 along Benson Road towards Benson. East of Garner, has an interchange with I-40 (exit 306A) before heading into Clayton. After passing through Clayton, US 70 has an interchange with I-42 at its temporary eastern terminus, merging into the freeway mainline.

=== Coastal Plain and Down East ===
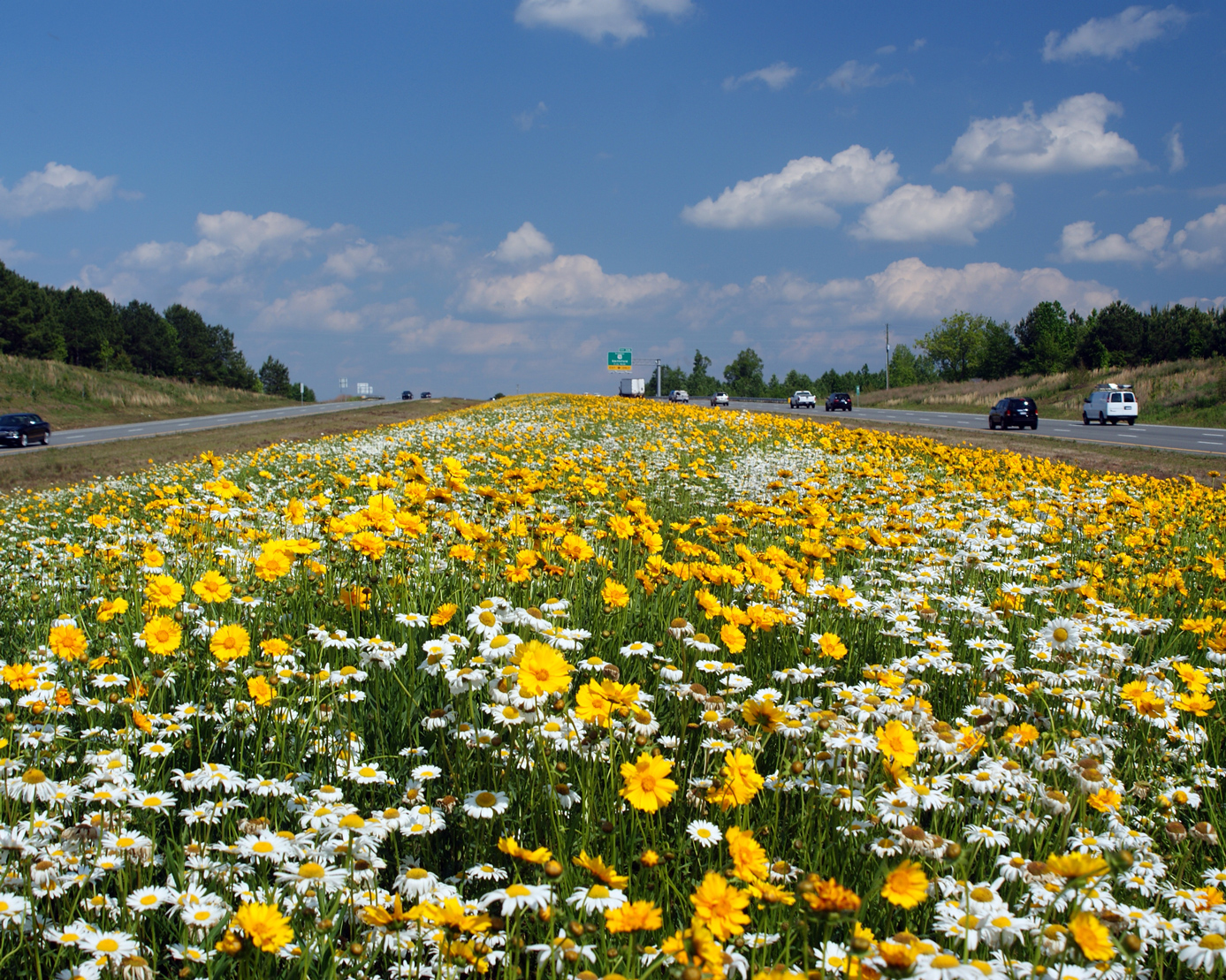
Oxeye daisies and Coreopsis lanceolata along the Clayton Bypass

Eastern terminus in Atlantic

Continuing through Wilson's Mills and crossing the Neuse River, US 70 enters Selma, where travelers have the choice to stay on mainline US 70, connecting with US 301/NC 39/NC 96, I-95, and US 70A, or take US 70 Bypass to avoid all that. Southeast of Selma, US 70 Bus. rejoins from Smithfield and near Princeton, US 70A rejoins from Pine Level. East of Princeton, it enters Wayne County. Northwest of Goldsboro, I-42 splits off from US 70 along the Goldsboro Bypass northeast towards I-795, while US 70 goes into Goldsboro. In Goldsboro, it also connects with I-795 and then joins a concurrency with US 13/US 117, passing north of the downtown area while US 70 Bus. goes through it via Grantham Street. After .61 miles (0.98 km), US 117 separates and continues north; at Berkeley Boulevard, US 13 separates towards Snow Hill and also connects to Seymour Johnson Air Force Base. East of Goldsboro, US 70 Bus. reunites along Ash Street. Entering Lenoir County, near LaGrange. I-42 reconnects with US 70, where I-42 currently ends, and will continue eastwards with US 70 in the future. US 70 connects with NC 148 at Falling Creek, which goes to the North Carolina Global TransPark. As it enters Kinston, it is joined by US 258, from Snow Hill, as they both bypass south of the downtown area, while US 70 Bus./US 258 Bus. go through the downtown area. Near Dupreeville, US 70 Bus./US 258 Bus. rejoin; they then separate, with US 258 continuing south to Richlands, while NC 58 shares a short concurrency before continuing towards Trenton.

Bypassing south of Dover, in Jones County, US 70 travels through the Great Dover Swamp, most of which has been drained and converted to farmland. After 11.9 miles (19.2 km) it enters Craven County, south of Cove City. At Clarks Road (exit 409) is the Craven County Rest Area. At exit 410A US 17 joins in concurrency as the freeway enters New Bern. The freeway, designated the Richard Spaight Memorial Highway, passes southeast of the downtown area and enters James City after crossing the Trent River via the Freedom Memorial Bridges. Traveling southeast along the U.S. Marine Corp Highway, US 70 passes by the Coastal Carolina Regional Airport, and then enters the Croatan National Forest before reaching the Marine Corps Air Station Cherry Point, in Havelock. Going south, it crosses into Carteret County and then passes west of Newport's downtown as it leaves the Croatan National Forest and into Morehead City. After connecting with the eastern terminus of NC 24, which goes to Swansboro, US 70, here known as Arendell Street, is split in the middle by the NCRR railroad. Adjacent to the Carteret Community College is the Carteret County Visitor Center; the Atlantic Beach Bridge connects Morehead City with Bogue Banks, including Fort Macon State Park. Through the downtown area, it reaches the end of the peninsula and the Port of Morehead City. Crossing over the Newport River/Intracoastal Waterway, it travels along Radio Island and then crosses Beaufort Channel (Gallants Creek) via Grayden Paul Bridge west of downtown Beaufort, US 70 then goes north out of Beaufort and then east, crossing over the North River and Ward Creek to Otway. Going southeast to Smyrna, it then turns northeasterly along the Core Sound. After crossing the Salter's Creek via Dan Taylor Memorial Bridge it connects with NC 12 continuing to Cedar Island and the Outer Banks. Through the Sea Level community and into Atlantic, where US 70 ends at School Drive, at 2,500 feet (760 m), the road ends at Little Port Brook.

== History ==
Established as an original U.S. Route (1926), US 70 was assigned along the Great Central Highway, in concurrency with NC 10, between Asheville and Beaufort; northwest of Asheville, US 70 shared concurrency with US 25/NC 20 (Dixie Highway) to the Tennessee state line. The original routing of US 70 connects the same cities as it does today through North Carolina, with interstate highways in parallel or in concurrency with it.

=== Early state routes ===
In 1916 the North Carolina State Highway Commission prepared a map for the Five Year Federal Aid Program. The general present-day routing of US 70 was a mix of both improved and unimproved highways. When the highways were signed, the majority of US 70's routing ran along NC 10 which was built from the Georgia state line south of Murphy to Beaufort. However, the routing north and west of Asheville comprised parts of NC 20 and NC 29. US 70 was established as an original U.S. route in 1926.

=== Original routing ===
US 70 was established as an original US highway running from US 66 near Holbrook, Arizona, to Beaufort, North Carolina. The highway entered the state at the Tennessee state line and followed along a topsoil road concurrently with NC 20. In Marshall, US 70 turned onto NC 20's former routing and followed it to the south. Upon reaching NC 29, US 70 turned to the south along the hard surface road and followed it to Asheville. North of Biltmore, US 70 turned left and followed along a hard surfaced road in concurrency with NC 10. Between Old Fort and Garden City the road switched to an oil-treated road and then briefly switched to a topsoil road between Garden City and Marion. As the road left Marion to the east, it again became a hard surface road. The highway continued east through Morganton and Hickory. In Conover, the highway turned due south until reaching Newton. In Newton, US 70/NC 10 turned to the left and followed a topsoil road to the southeast. The highway made several turns between the northeast and the southeast before reaching Statesville. The highway turned left in Statesville to follow along a hard-surfaced highway to Salisbury. Upon reaching Salisbury, US 70/NC 10 turned to the left and followed concurrently along US 170 to the northeast. In Greensboro, the route turned to the east through Burlington to Graham. The highway followed a brief concurrency with NC 62 between Graham and Mebane before again turning to the east. The route ran through Hillsborough and Durham before turning south through Brassfield and Nelson. In Cary, US 70/NC 10 met up with US 1/NC 50 and followed a brief concurrency between Cary and Raleigh. After passing through Raleigh, US 70 turned to the south to run through Garner before turning east to pass through Auburn and Clayton. Upon reaching Smithfield, the highway turned to the left and followed briefly along NC 22 to the northeast. Just before reaching Selma, US 70/NC 10 turned right to head to the southeast. The hard-surfaced highway passed through Goldsboro and La Grange before reaching Kinston. In Kinston, the highway turned to the northeast and ran briefly concurrent with NC 11 before running east toward Fort Barnwell. As the highway neared the Neuse River, it turned to the southeast to parallel the river to New Bern. Passing through New Bern, the highway continued to follow the Neuse until reaching Havelock where the river turns further to the east. Shortly after passing Havelock, the road turned toward the east. After intersecting NC 101 the road type changed to a topsoil road. The highway continued as a topsoil road until North Harlowe, where it became a graded road. Just before entering Beaufort the highway changed back to a hard surface road. US 70 and NC 10 both ended in Beaufort.

=== Early 20th century ===
In 1928 US 70/NC 10 was swapped with route NC 101 towards Beaufort. Around 1929 US 70 was placed on its modern routing between Marion and Nebo; its former routing becoming part of NC 105. North of Newton, US 70 was given a new primary routing in concurrency with NC 110. In Raleigh, US 70 was placed on a new primary routing along Western Boulevard, then north along Boylan Avenue to South Street, then Fayetteville Street to Lenoir Street, and finally East Street; the old alignment along Hillsborough Road and by the state capital remained part of US 1/NC 50. In 1930 US 70/NC 10 was swapped with NC 100 between Gibsonville and Burlington. Also around that time US 70/NC 10 was rerouted in downtown Salisbury via Innes Street to Main Street, leaving behind Fulton and Liberty streets.

In 1931 US 70 was extended northeast from Beaufort to Atlantic, ending at Cedar Island Road (SR 1387). Around 1932 US 70 was rerouted in downtown Asheville from Biltmore Avenue onto Tunnel Road; the old alignment remained part of US 25. In 1934 both NC 10 and NC 20 were removed along US 70's route. By 1936, US 70 was placed on First Avenue through Hickory and was removed from Beaman Road near New Bern. In 1939 US 70 was removed from Hollins Road in Marshall.

=== Mid-20th century ===
In 1941, US 70 was swapped with NC 55 from Kinston to west of New Bern. Also, around that same year, US 70 was given its modern routing between the Yadkin River and Lexington. By 1944, US 70 was removed from Old Highway 70 Loop (SR 1620) near Icard; in Havelock, US 70 was removed from Church Road, Miller Boulevard and Roosevelt Boulevard to its modern alignment. Around 1948, US 70 was swapped with US 70A in the Hickory–Conover area and with US 70A in Hillsborough. By 1949, US 70 was placed on its modern routing between Swannanoa and Black Mountain and between Lexington and Thomasville, swapped with US 70A in High Point, removed from Bennett Memorial Drive in Durham, and switched from Wilson Street to Kornegay Street in Dover.

In 1952, US 70 was placed on new bypasses in Lexington, Thomasville, and Durham; all former alignments became individual or extensions of existing US 70A. By 1953, US 70 was rerouted back onto Fulton Street and Liberty Street in Salisbury, US 70 was split on one-way streets in downtown Greensboro, and US 70 was rerouted onto Eden and Front Streets in New Bern. In 1954 US 70 was rerouted onto Woodfin Street in Asheville; placed on its modern alignment between Black Mountain and Old Fort, leaving behind Mill Creek Road (SR 1407)/Old US 70 (SR 1400), placed on one-way streets in downtown Raleigh, and rerouted on a more direct route between Smithfield and Princeton along existing secondary roads, leaving behind US 70A through Selma. Around 1956 US 70 was placed on new bypass south of Morganton. By 1957, US 70 was split on one-way streets in downtown Marion, replaced US 70A in Salisbury, leaving the downtown area, and placed on its modern alignment in western Rowan County. It was placed on its modern alignment from Thomasville to Greensboro, then continued east to Efland, its old alignment becoming US 70A; it was placed on new bypass east of Durham, its former alignment along Avondale Drive, Greer Street, and Miami Boulevard becoming parts of NC 55, NC 98, and US 70A respectively. It was placed on bypass north Goldsboro, leaving behind US 70A through the downtown area, and placed on bypass south of Kinston, also leaving behind US 70A through its downtown area. On November 14, 1959, 11.3 miles (18.2 km) of US 70 east of Greensboro were opened as the first section of a freeway intended to be upgraded to become Interstate 85. Around 1958 US 70 was removed from Ann Street to its current routing along Cedar Street in Beaufort. In 1960 US 25/US 70 was placed on new bypass north of Marshall, leaving behind US 25 Bus./US 70 Bus.

In 1961, US 70 was removed from Woodfin Street and onto the East–West Freeway in Asheville; in Salisbury, US 70 was rerouted following Innes Street south to I-85, then continued north in concurrency into Davidson County. In 1963 US 70 was rerouted back along its former alignment between Greensboro and Efland, replacing part of US 70A; the former freeway alignment remains part of I-85. Around 1964 US 70 was placed on new causeway over the Newport River/Intracoastal Waterway; bridges on the old alignment were removed, leaving Old Causeway Road (SR 1205) on Radio Island. Around 1965 US 70 was removed from I-85 in Rowan County, rerouted through downtown Salisbury on one-way streets, then north along Main Street in concurrency with US 29. In 1967 US 70 was rerouted onto O. Henry Boulevard to Wendover Avenue in Greensboro; its old alignment along Market Street was downgraded to secondary roads. In the same year, US 70 was adjusted at the Salisbury and Wilmington Street split. By 1968, US 70 was placed on a new bypass west of Newport, leaving behind Chatham Street (SR 1247). In 1969 US 70 was placed on a new bypass south of La Grange, leaving behind Washington Street (SR 1603). In 1970 US 70 eastbound was removed from Main Street and onto Logan Street in Marion. In the same year, US 70 was placed on a new bypass north of Princeton, leaving behind Dr. Donnie H. Jones Jr. Boulevard (SR 2556).

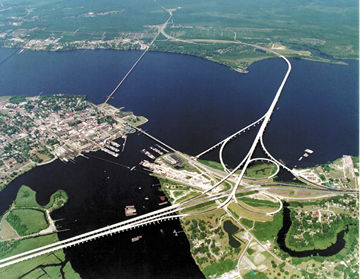
Aerial photograph of US 70 bypassing the city of New Bern, crossing the Trent River; US 17 can be seen crossing the Neuse River in the background

=== Late 20th century ===
In 1972, US 19/US 23/US 70 was removed from Merrimon Avenue, between Asheville and Woodfin, and placed on a new freeway; US 25 remains along the old alignment. In Raleigh, US 70/NC 50 were removed from Glenwood Avenue and placed on the Raleigh Beltline to North Boulevard/Downtown Boulevard. In Atlantic, US 70 was truncated to its current eastern terminus at School Drive; the former alignment was abandoned, with a bridge removed from the Atlantic Harbor of Refuge Channel. From 1978 to 1979, in phases, US 70 was placed on a new bypass south of Dover and New Bern; the former alignment became Old US Highway 70 (SR 1005).

In 1981 US 70 was rerouted from Crosstown Expressway onto Charlotte, Poplar, and Pine Streets (the latter two removed for College Street) to Beaucatcher Tunnel; this replaced part of NC 694, while Crosstown Expressway was rerouted through Beaucatcher Cut. In Salisbury, US 70 was rerouted south along Jake Alexander Boulevard, in concurrency with US 601, to Main Street, where it joined US 29 through the city; the old alignment along Innes, Liberty, Fulton, and Lee Streets was downgraded to secondary roads. In Burlington, US 70/NC 62 was realigned along one-way streets along Church and Fisher Streets, eliminating the use of Davis and Hoke Streets. In 1982 US 25/US 70 was placed on a new alignment north of Marshall to Weaverville; the old alignment became an extension of existing business loops in Marshall and Weaverville, and some sections were downgraded to secondary roads around Woodfin. In the same year, upgrades between Black Mountain and Old Fort were completed, allowing the addition of I-40 alongside US 70. In 1987 US 25/US 70 was placed on a new bypass west of Walnut, leaving behind Walnut Drive (SR 1349). In 1989 US 70 was removed from downtown Raleigh and was completely rerouted onto the Raleigh Beltline going east, then south, continuing at I-40 southeasterly to exit 306; the former alignment through Raleigh and Garner became US 70 Bus., though unsigned inside the Beltline. In 1990 US 70 was rerouted onto Industrial Boulevard and Monroe Street, from Newton Drive to east of I-77, in Statesville; the former alignment along Front Street and Salisbury Road was downgraded to secondary roads.

In 1991, one-way streets along Logan, New, and Garden Streets were discontinued and reallocated to the city of Marion to maintain; US 70 reverted to two-way traffic along Main and Court Streets. In the same year, US 70 was removed from the Raleigh Beltline and rerouted along Glenwood Avenue, Wade Avenue, Capital Boulevard, Dawson–McDowell Streets, and Saunders Street. South of the Raleigh Beltline, it continued along Saunders, then Wilmington Street, and through Garner to I-40; the reroute in Wake County replaced all of US 70 Bus.

In 1993 US 70 was rerouted onto a new bypass north of Haw River, leaving Main Street (SR 1801) and a short concurrency with NC 49. Also, construction was completed on a project that widened the road between Relaigih and Morehead City to a total of four lanes.

In Orange and Durham counties, US 70's concurrency with I-85 was extended 2.5 miles (4.0 km) as part of a major reconfiguration of exits 172 and 173. The original configuration had Hillsborough Road weave in and out of I-85 between the two exits; the realignment of US 70 allowed NCDOT to remove the weave and re-purpose exit 172 as an interchange for NC 147 (completed in 2001). The former alignment became an extension of US 70 Bus., which for the remainder of the decade had a hidden concurrency with I-85/US 70, with the weave persisting during construction.

In 1997 NCDOT established the oddity known as the four US 70s of Selma–Smithfield: US 70, US 70A, US 70 Bus. and US 70 Bypass. Before 1997, US 70 was routed through Smithfield while US 70A followed the pre-1954 route through Selma. The new configuration established US 70 following its former route east to Selma, with a short bypass route of I-95 (no interchange), then reconnecting to an existing section of US 70 east of I-95; US 70A was truncated near the I-95 interchange in Selma, while the former alignment through Smithfield became a business route.

=== 21st century ===
On June 9, 2008, the Clayton Bypass opened, redirecting US 70 onto I-40 between exits 306 to 309 and then on a new 10.7-mile (17.2 km) four-lane freeway bypass south of Clayton. Planning for the bypass began in 1991, but construction did not start until 2005 because of several delays regarding the dwarf wedgemussel, an endangered species, habitat in the area. Originally scheduled for completion in June 2009, a severe drought in 2007–2008 allowed construction to proceed more rapidly than anticipated. NCDOT was given the approval by AASHTO to officially designate US 70 along the bypass on May 6, 2008, with the former alignment becoming an extension of US 70 Bus. Compared to the former alignment through Clayton, the bypass is estimated to cut fifteen minutes of travel time for drivers traveling between Raleigh and eastern North Carolina.

In 2010, US 70 was placed on Statesville Boulevard, a then new 3.81-mile (6.13 km) four-lane expressway running east of Statesville towards Salisbury; the former alignment was downgraded to a secondary road.

In December 2011, the first section of the Goldsboro Bypass was opened from I-795 to Wayne Memorial Drive. The section was temporarily numbered as NC 44, while the western and eastern sections were under construction. The western section of the bypass from US 70 west of Goldsboro to I-795 opened on October 17, 2015. The final section from Wayne Memorial Drive to US 70 was completed in May 2016. The route was listed as US 70 Bypass., while the routes in the city are currently being signed as US 70 and US 70 Business. In May 2022, US 70 Bypass was replaced by I-42; I-42 signage replaced US 70 Bypass signage in Fall 2024.

In 2013, US 70 was placed on a new freeway, with an interchange with NC 148 at Falling Creek. Justification for the improvement was given as a need for better service to the Global TransPark; the old alignment was reduced from four to two lanes, becoming Sanderson Way (SR 2032).

In east Durham, the construction of the East End Connector linking NC 147 and US 70 began in February 2015 as part of the I-885 proposal. The project also altered the interchanges at Carr Road and NC 98 (Holloway Street), to a dumbbell and a diamond interchange, respectively. Once scheduled to be completed in January 2020, the East End Connector and related road improvement projects were eventually completed on June 30, 2022. I-885 was officially designated along the entire freeway portion of US 70, a route that continues past US 70 down toward I-40 through the Research Triangle Park.

On October 5, 2019, NCDOT submitted an application to AASHTO, and received approval, for the re-routing of US 70 in Greensboro, High Point, and part of Thomasville. Under the new state plan, the highway continues west along Wendover Avenue through Greensboro to NC 68 (Eastchester Drive) in High Point, and then onto NC 68, south-bound from High Point to the southern terminus of NC 68 in Thomasville. According to NCDOT, this change should provide a more direct, continuous route through the cities of Greensboro and High Point, improve regional connectivity, and remove traffic from concurrent interstate routes (e.g. I-40's "Death Valley" interchange in Greensboro, and the I-85/US 29 interchange near Jamestown).Wendover Avenue, which was previously completed circa-1971, had already served as the key east-west expressway-freeway for Central and Downtown Greensboro, with most of the bridges on the central stretch, being renovated in the early-mid 2010s. The interchanges with I-40 and Guilford College Road, were rebuilt in the 1990s and 2000s, with "minor" updates to the Wendover Avenue interchange after the rebuild. (Note: Listed from here on source of Southern Forsyth County growth.) A project to create the Slocum Gate interchange at Cherry Point MCAS was completed in March 2020.

The Gallants Channel Bridge was a project to replace the Grayden Paul Bridge by rerouting US 70 over Gallants Channel in Beaufort with a 65-foot (20 m) fixed span bridge, widened to four-lanes with a median at a new location, and building a new bridge on Turner Street, for an estimated $66.4 million. Construction began on March 25, 2015, by Conti Enterprises, Inc., of Edison, New Jersey. All work but landscaping was scheduled to be completed by July 15, 2018, with final completion expected in January 2019. After its completion, the bascule bridge was demolished and US 70 was routed out of downtown Beaufort.

In November 2023, AASHTO approved the eliminating part of US 70 Bus., between Garner and Clayton, and rerouted mainline US 70 off the Clayton Bypass and back along its former alignment through there. I-42 had been designated on the Clayton Bypass in 2022, although it was not fully signed as such until 2025.

A 5-mile (8.0 km) section of US 70 at Wilson's Mills, connecting to the Clayton Bypass in the west was upgraded to a freeway for an estimated $31 million. The plan called for US 70 to be carried on a bridge over Wilson Mills Road while a bridge will carry Swift Creek Road over US 70. Interchanges were made at both roads and a connector road paralleling US 70 between the two roads was also built. Construction was planned to begin in 2020 and finish around 2022. However, COVID-19 funding issues postponed the awarding of the construction contract from September 2020 to March 2021. Construction officially began on May 12, 2021, and is expected to be completed by the middle of Fall 2024. The Swift Creek Road exit was partially opened to traffic in Spring 2024. After some further delays due to drainage issues along the segment, the project was officially completed on December 17, 2025, after all the "Speed Limit 70" signs were added. I-42 signage will be added once it is approved by the FHWA.

== Future ==
=== Interstate 42 (Clayton to Morehead City) ===
A multi-county project, also known as the "US 70 Corridor" or "Super 70", is a collection of several projects along US 70 to improve passenger and freight movement eventually leading to the establishment of Interstate 42 (I-42), which is the US Department of Transportation's High Priority Corridor #82. The Fixing America's Surface Transportation Act (FAST Act), signed by then President Barack Obama on December 14, 2015, added the US 70 corridor between Garner and Morehead City to the Interstate system as a future Interstate. Justification for the designation included better connections with Seymour Johnson Air Force Base, the North Carolina Global Transpark, Marine Corps Air Station Cherry Point, and the Port of Morehead City with the rest of state and the eastern seaboard. With no specified number codified in the act, the Regional Transportation Alliance (RTA) expected this corridor to be called Interstate 46 (I-46) or another suitable designation, and the US Highway 70 Corridor Commission recommended Interstate 50 (I-50). On March 30, 2016, Governor Pat McCrory and various officials unveiled "Future Interstate" signage along the corridor.

For the Spring 2016 AASHTO Special Committee on U.S. Route Numbering, NCDOT proposed Interstate 36 (I-36) for this route since there were no other routes with that number in the state. However, on May 24, 2016, AASHTO assigned Interstate 42 for the route. The entire project has a budgeted cost (as of late 2018) of about $1.3 billion, and about 29 miles still without a budget. Some projects like the Clayton and Goldsboro bypasses are completed, while others have yet to be scheduled. The project involves the counties of Wake, Johnston, Wayne, Lenoir, Jones, Craven, and Carteret.

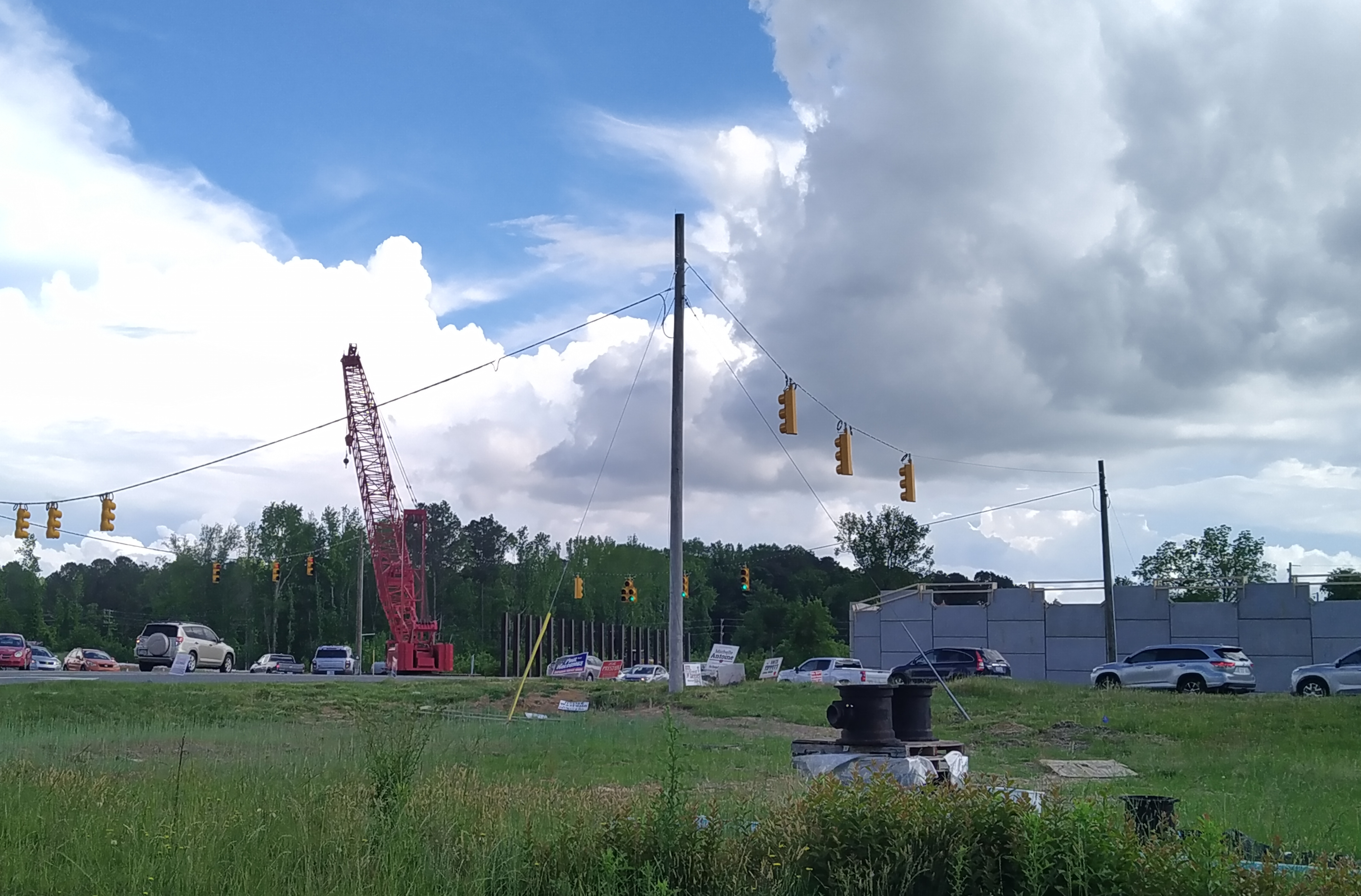
Overpass construction at Wilson's Mills Road in May 2022

In October 2021, AASHTO approved two segments of I-42, the 10-mile (16 km) Clayton Bypass and the 21.7-mile (34.9 km) Goldsboro Bypass; this was followed by the Federal Highway Administration subsequent approval in March 2022. In May 2022, AASHTO also approved the elimination of US 70 Bypass, clearing the way for NCDOT to fully redesignate the route. Signage for the route was expected to be put up later in 2022, but was delayed indefinitely for reasons that were initially unknown. In July 2023, NCDOT announced that they were proposing to renumber NC 42 to NC 36 (which was the number originally suggested for the new interstate before 42 was chosen) between NC 50 and U.S. Route 70 Business (US 70 Bus) in Clayton in order to avoid confusing motorist when the Clayton bypass is designated as I-42. Once I-42 is signed onto the Clayton Bypass, US 70 will be rerouted onto its old routing through Clayton, which is currently designated as part of US 70 Bus. NCDOT requested public input on this proposal at an open house on October 12, 2023. US 70 has also been upgraded to interstate highway standards between Dover and New Bern, but this cannot be signed as I-42 until the Kinston Bypass is completed as this segment is not connected to the Interstate highway system. I-42 is expected to be completed in its entirety by 2032 and will include the installation of broadband fiber along the entire route.

==== Smithfield/Selma improvements ====
Improvements are in the planning stages for the 13.8-mile (22.2 km) segment of US 70 between Wilson's Mills and Princeton. Some of this section is already a freeway but will require improvements to bring it up to interstate standards and add an interchange with I-95. Adding the interchange will require shifting I-95, which is going to be widened in this area, 2,000 feet (610 m) east to incorporate the new changes. This proposed project is still in the study phase and not currently budgeted nor does it have a timeline for completion. I-95 and US 70 Business Route (exit 95) is being reconstructed though.

==== Princeton Bypass to Goldsboro Bypass ====
The existing Princeton Bypass eastward to the Goldsboro Bypass will be improved to interstate standards, which is estimated to cost $170 million. The 6.7-mile (10.8 km) project for the upgrade of US 70 will be done in two parts: the first will be in the Princeton area between US 70A to North Pearl Street/Edwards Roads (construction is scheduled to start in 2025) with second part starting there and ending at the Goldsboro Bypass (construction is scheduled to start in 2028). Currently, project funding has been suspended by NCDOT due to agency's budget issues. The agency is currently working with state legislators to find alternative sources of revenue.

==== Kinston Bypass ====
The Kinston Bypass is a project that has been in the planning stages since the 1990s. The project was put on hold until 2007 when NCDOT revitalized the project. While several northern bypasses were planned, in January 2014, the northern bypasses were removed in favor of a southern alternative, but the project was defunded in 2014 with the release of the 2015–2024 State Transportation Improvement Plan, and studies were suspended. In June 2022, NCDOT announced that they had chosen Alternative 1SB for the Kinston Bypass. This alternative would be approximately 21 miles (34 km) of a four-lane, median divided freeway accessible via ramps at 10 interchanges. Part of the project will also build service roads along the freeway as well as approximately 6.5 miles (10.5 km) of new roadway that will be south of the current US 70 alignment in the Kinston area. When complete, the bypass would improve regional mobility, connectivity, and capacity for US 70, reducing traffic congestion and delays that exist along US 70 between La Grange and Dover. The westernmost section, which is approximately 2.8 miles (4.5 km) and includes the interchange at Jim Sutton Road/Willie Measley Road, was included in NCDOT 2018-2027 State Transportation Improvement, which allowed preliminary engineering activities to resume. The four remaining sections east of this section were reinserted into 2024-2033 STIP Projects Map. However, as of 2023, no funding has been set aside for the project, which is expected to cost $716.2 million. Additionally, the easternmost interchange between US 70/Future I-42 and Caswell Station Road/Wyse Fork Road east of Kinston currently faces local opposition due to it impacting part of the land where the Battle of Wyse Fork was fought on.

==== James City freeway ====
In James City, a 5.1-mile (8.2 km) segment of the US 70 improvement project will upgrade the existing highway to freeway standards by elevating it over existing surface streets as a six-lane, median divided freeway, improving the frontage roads, removing 49 businesses and 17 homes, converting the five intersections along this segment to interchanges with all but one of them being dogbones (the other will be a parclo), and eliminating a railroad crossing just south of exit 417. The project, which is projected to cost $66 million, will connect to the existing US 70 freeway in New Bern. Construction was scheduled to begin in early 2020 and be complete in early 2024. However, the design-build project did not start until January 2021 and its completion was delayed by a year to the end of 2024. Construction on the project finally began in Spring 2022 and as of February 2023, the project is about 1/3 completed. However, its completion was delayed again, this time to the middle of 2025. It is now expected to be completed in late-2027.

==== James City to Havelock ====
Between James City and Havelock, a 6.4-mile (10.3 km) section of US 70 will be converted to interstate standards. The final cost of the project is estimated to be $275.161 million with $147 million coming from a federal grant the state received in 2018. This segment will be a four-lane, median divided freeway accessible via ramps at three interchanges. With the release of the 2020 draft STIP, it was revealed that NCDOT was attempting to start construction in 2020, but this was delayed several times due to design and funding issues before a $242.35 million design-build contract for construction was finally awarded to Balfour Beatty in February 2023. Right-of-way acquisition will begin in Fall 2023 with construction beginning in Spring 2024. Completion is set for Summer 2028.

==== Havelock Bypass ====
The Havelock Bypass is a 10.1-mile (16.3 km) four-lane freeway intended to improve existing sections of US 70 and a bypass west of Havelock, through the Croatan National Forest. The routing through Havelock became US 70 Bus. Draft and environmental studies began in September 2011 and were completed in January 2016. Property acquisition started in 2016, with construction expected to begin in February 2019 and be completed in 2022 at an estimated cost of $173 million. However, construction did not officially begin until August 2019 and with its completion set for May 2024; it was later changed to late-Summer 2024. Since that time, the completion was pushed out to Fall 2025 due to weather delays, although the US 70 east overpass at the east end of the bypass was opened to traffic on June 20, 2024. According to Balfour Beatty, the project includes the construction of 15 bridges, which will require around 4.43 million cubic meters of borrow material and 288,000 tonnes of asphalt. The bypass opened to traffic on December 19, 2025, although construction will not be completed until late-2026.

==== Havelock Bypass to Morehead City ====
The Newport River Bridge will be reconfigured from two-lanes to four-lanes.

===== Northern Carteret Bypass =====
According to the Comprehensive Transportation Plans from Carteret and Craven counties, I-42 is proposed to be routed on a new alignment which will be called the Northern Carteret Bypass. It will pass north of Morehead City before curving back south and terminating at US 70 north of Beaufort. This was further confirmed when the ECC (Eastern Carolina Council) noted that I-42 would likely be built to bypass Morehead City to the north due to the inability to build it through the city itself. However, no funding has been provided for this bypass as of 2024.

== Major intersections ==
County	Location	mi	km	Old exit	New exit	Destinations	Notes
Madison		0.00	0.00			US 25 north / US 70 west (SR 9 west) – Newport	Continuation into Tennessee
Madison	Hot Springs	5.8	9.3			NC 209 south (Lance Avenue) – Lake Junaluska	
Madison	Hurricane	11.0	17.7			NC 208 north – Greeneville	
Madison		16.5	26.6			Walnut Drive (NC 213 west)	West end of NC 213 overlap
Madison		20.0	32.2			US 25 Bus. south / US 70 Bus. east (Main Street) – Downtown Marshall, Public Library	
Madison		22.3	35.9			NC 213 east – Mars Hill, Mars Hill University	East end of NC 213 overlap
Madison		23.5	37.8			NC 251 south (Tillery Branch Road)	
Madison		25.3	40.7			US 25 Bus. north / US 70 Bus. west (Ivy River Road) – Marshall	
Buncombe	Weaverville	32.0	51.5			Future I-26 west / US 19 / US 23 north – Johnson City	West end of Future I-26/US 19/US 23 overlap; I-26 north exit 19B, south exit 19
Buncombe	Weaverville	32.0	51.5		19A	Weaverville	No exit number eastbound; exit numbers follow I-26
Buncombe	Weaverville	34.3	55.2		21	New Stock Road – Weaverville	
Buncombe	Woodfin	36.3	58.4		23	US 25 south (US 19 Bus.) / Merrimon Avenue – Woodfin, North Asheville	East end of US 25 overlap
Buncombe	Woodfin	37.2	59.9		24	Elk Mountain Road – Woodfin	
Buncombe	Asheville	38.5	62.0		25	NC 251 – University of North Carolina Asheville	
Buncombe	Asheville	40.0	64.4		—	Hill Street	Westbound exit and eastbound entrance
Buncombe	Asheville	40.2	64.7		—	Future I-26 / US 19 / US 23 south / I-240 / US 74A west to I-40 west – West Asheville	East end of Future I-26/US 19/US 23 overlap; west end of I-240/US 74A overlap; I-240 exit 4A
Buncombe	Asheville	40.2	64.7		—	Patton Avenue – Downtown	Exit numbers follow I-240; no westbound exit
Buncombe	Asheville	40.7	65.5		4C	Montford Avenue / Haywood Street	
Buncombe	Asheville	41.2	66.3		5A	US 25 (Merrimon Avenue)	Eastbound entrance includes direct entrance ramp from Woodfin Street
Buncombe	Asheville	41.5	66.8			I-240 east – Oteen	East end of I-240 overlap; I-240 exit 5B
Buncombe	Asheville	41.8	67.3			NC 694 north (Town Mountain Road)	
Buncombe	Asheville					Beaucatcher Tunnel	
Buncombe	Asheville	42.6	68.6			I-240	I-240 exit 6; access to I-240 east via Chunns Cove Road
Buncombe	Asheville	43.4	69.8			US 74A east (South Tunnel Road) – Mall	East end of US 74A overlap
Buncombe	Asheville	43.6	70.2			I-240	Three-level diamond interchange; I-240 exit 7
Buncombe	Asheville	45.5	73.2			NC 81 west (Swannanoa River Road)	
Buncombe	Asheville	46.1	74.2			Blue Ridge Parkway – Folk Art Center, Mount Mitchell State Park	Interchange
Buncombe	Asheville					Porters Cove Road to I-40	I-40 exit 55
Buncombe	Black Mountain	55.8	89.8			NC 9 to I-40 west	
Buncombe	Black Mountain	56.5	90.9			I-40 west	West end of I-40 overlap; westbound left exit and eastbound left entrance; I-40 exit 65
Buncombe	Ridgecrest	57.9	93.2		66	Dunsmore Avenue – Ridgecrest	Exit number follows I-40
McDowell		63.5	102.2			I-40 east	East end of I-40 overlap; eastbound left entrance and westbound left exit; I-40 exit 72
McDowell		73.0	117.5			NC 80 north (Lake Tahoma Road)	To Mount Mitchell State Park
McDowell	Marion	74.8	120.4			US 221 / NC 226 – Spruce Pine, Newland	
McDowell	Marion	75.0	120.7			US 221 Bus. north (Main Street) – Spruce Pine, Newland	North end of US 221 Business overlap
McDowell	Marion	77.2	124.2			US 221 Bus. south (Main Street) – Rutherfordton	South end of US 221 Business overlap
McDowell	Nebo	82.2	132.3			NC 126 east	To Lake James State Park
Burke	Morganton	96.2	154.8			US 64 east (By-pass) / US 70 Bus. east (Union Street east) to NC 18 / NC 181	North end of US 64 overlap
Burke	Morganton	97.3	156.6			US 64 west / US 64 Bus. east (Burkemont Avenue) – Rutherfordton	South end of US 64 overlap
Burke	Morganton	98.4	158.4			NC 18 (Sterling Street) – Shelby	
Burke	Morganton	100.5	161.7			US 70 Bus. west (Union Street)	
Burke	Drexel	104.0	167.4			NC 114 (Drexel Road)	
Catawba	Hickory	118.5	190.7			US 321 to I-40 – Lenoir, Asheville, Statesville US 321 Bus. begins	Interchange; US 321 exit 44; north end of US 321 Bus. overlap
Catawba	Hickory	119.5	192.3			Center Street to NC 127	Access to Frye Regional Medical Center
Catawba	Hickory	121.5	195.5			Lenoir Rhyne Boulevard to I-40	I-40 exit 125
Catawba	Conover	126.5	203.6			US 321 Bus. south to NC 16 7th Street Place SW to NC 16 Bus.	South end of US 321 Bus. overlap
Catawba	Conover	127.8	205.7			NC 16 (Thornburg Drive NE)	
Catawba	Catawba	134.5	216.5			NC 10 – Newton	
Catawba River						Bridge	
Iredell	Statesville	145.8	234.6			US 64 / NC 90 – Taylorsville	
Iredell	Statesville	148.0	238.2			US 21 / NC 115 (Shelton Avenue) – Troutman	
Iredell	Statesville	149.2	240.1			I-77 – Charlotte, Elkin	I-77 exit 49A
Rowan		162.4	261.4			NC 801 south – Mooresville	South end of NC 801 overlap
Rowan		164.0	263.9			NC 801 north – Cooleemee	North end of NC 801 overlap
Rowan	Salisbury	170.0	273.6			US 601 north (Jake Alexander Boulevard North) – Mocksville	West end of US 601 overlap
Rowan	Salisbury	172.5	277.6			NC 150 (Mooresville Road) – Mooresville	
Rowan	Salisbury	173.5	279.2			US 29 south (Main Street) / US 601 south (Jake Alexander Boulevard South) to I-85 – Rowan County Airport, China Grove	Interchange; east end of US 601 overlap; west end of US 29 overlap
Rowan	Salisbury	174.3	280.5			NC 150 west (Mooresville Road)	West end of NC 150 overlap
Yadkin River						Bridge	
Davidson		182.2	293.2			I-85 / US 52 south – Salisbury, Charlotte	Permanently closed as of April 2010; former exit 82 on I-85
Davidson		183.0	294.5			NC 150 east	East end of NC 150 overlap
Davidson		183.0	294.5			I-85 / US 52 south – Salisbury, Charlotte	West end of freeway section; west end of I-85/US 52 overlap; I-85 exit 84
Davidson		184.0	296.1		85	Clark Road	Permanently closed as of November 2012; exit numbers follow I-85
Davidson		185.4	298.4		86	Belmont Road	
Davidson	Lexington	187.5	301.8		—	I-85 north – High Point, Greensboro; I-285 begin	East end of I-85 overlap; west end of I-285 overlap; eastbound left exit and westbound left entrance; I-85 exit 87; former southern terminus of I-85 BL
Davidson	Lexington	188.0	302.6		84	NC 47 east to I-85 north	Exit numbers follow US 52
Davidson	Lexington	188.8	303.8		85	Green Needles Road	Exit numbers follow US 52
Davidson	Lexington	190.0	305.8		86	Lexington, Downtown	Exit numbers follow US 52
Davidson	Lexington	191.0	307.4		—	I-285 north / US 52 north – Winston-Salem	East end of I-285/US 52 overlap; eastbound exit and westbound entrance; I-285 exit 87
Davidson	Lexington	192.0	309.0		—	Old US 64	Split into separate exits (east and west) westbound
Davidson	Lexington	192.7	310.1		—	US 64 west – Mocksville	West end of US 64 overlap
Davidson	Lexington				—	Smokehouse Lane	Right-in/right-out interchange; westbound exit and entrance
Davidson	Lexington	193.5	311.4		—	NC 8 (Winston Road) – Lexington, Winston-Salem	East end of freeway
Davidson	Lexington	194.0	312.2			US 64 east – Asheboro, Lexington	Interchange; east end of US 64 overlap
Davidson	Thomasville	201.5	324.3			Thomasville	Interchange; eastbound exit and westbound entrance
Davidson	Thomasville	204.0	328.3			NC 109 – Thomasville, Winston-Salem	Interchange
Davidson	Thomasville	205.5	330.7			US 29 north / National Highway south – Thomasville NC 68 begins	East end of US 29 overlap; west end of NC 68 overlap; interchange with US 29; southern terminus of NC 68; US 29 north is former I-85 BL north / US 70 east
Guilford	High Point					I-74 – Winston-Salem, Asheboro	Parclo interchange; I-74 exit 67
Guilford	High Point					NC 68 north (Eastchester Drive north) – Cone Health MedCenter High Point (Emergency Medical Care)	East end of NC 68 overlap
Guilford						Guilford College Road – Jamestown	Two-quadrant interchange
Guilford	Greensboro					I-73 / US 421 – Asheboro, Winston-Salem, Martinsville	Parclo interchange; I-73 exit 102
Guilford	Greensboro					I-40 (Fordham Boulevard) – Greensboro, Durham	Parclo interchange; I-40 exit 214
Guilford	Greensboro				—	Spring Garden Street	West end of freeway
Guilford	Greensboro				—	S. Holden Road	Inverted diamond interchange; left exits and entrances
Guilford	Greensboro				—	Market Street – Downtown	Downtown only signed eastbound; eastbound on-ramp from frontage road
Guilford	Greensboro				—	Friendly Avenue	Access via frontage roads; access from westbound via Benjamin Parkway south exit
Guilford	Greensboro				—	Benjamin Parkway – Shopping Center	Modified cloverleaf interchange; shopping center only signed westbound
Guilford	Greensboro				—	Westover Terrace north to US 220 (Battleground Avenue north)	US 220 and Battleground Ave. north not signed westbound
Guilford	Greensboro				—	Battleground Avenue south	Eastbound exit and westbound entrance
Guilford	Greensboro				—	US 220 north (Battleground Avenue) – Roanoke	Westbound exit and eastbound entrance; western end of US 220 concurrency
Guilford	Greensboro				—	Grecade Street	East end of freeway; eastbound exit and entrance only
Guilford	Greensboro					Yanceyville Street	Interchange; no eastbound exit; access from eastbound via Cypress Street
Guilford	Greensboro					Summit Avenue – Downtown	Interchange; westbound separated into exits for northbound and southbound Summit Ave.
Guilford	Greensboro	228.0	366.9			US 29 south / US 220 south – High Point	Cloverleaf interchange; eastern end of US 220 concurrency; former US 70 west
Guilford	Greensboro	228.0	366.9			US 29 north – Reidsville	Cloverleaf interchange
Guilford	Greensboro	229.5	369.3			Huffine Mill Road	Interchange; westbound entrance includes direct exit ramp onto Oak Grove Avenue/Foushee Street
Guilford	Greensboro	232.0	373.4			I-785 / I-840 to I-40 / I-85 – Danville, Raleigh, Charlotte	I-840 exit 18
Guilford	Whitsett	240.0	386.2			NC 100 east – Gibsonville	Western terminus of NC 100
Guilford	Whitsett	240.2	386.6			NC 61 – Gibsonville	
Alamance	Burlington	246.0	395.9			NC 54 east (Chapel Hill Road) / NC 62 south (Alamance Road) – Alamance	West end of NC 62 overlap
Alamance	Burlington	247.8	398.8			NC 87 / NC 100 (Webb Avenue)	
Alamance	Burlington	248.2	399.4			NC 62 north (Rauhunt Street) – Yanceyville	East end of NC 62 overlap
Alamance	Haw River	252.8	406.8			NC 49 – Graham	
Alamance	Mebane	257.5	414.4			NC 119 north (Second Street)	West end of NC 119 overlap
Alamance	Mebane	257.7	414.7			NC 119 south (Fifth Street)	East end of NC 119 overlap
Orange		265.0	426.5			NC 86 Truck south to I-40 / I-85 – Greensboro	West end of NC 86 Truck overlap; westbound left exit and eastbound entrance
Orange	Hillsborough	266.8	429.4			US 70 Bus. east (Revere Road) / Short Street West / Faucett Mill Road – Hillsborough	
Orange	Hillsborough	267.2	430.0			NC 86 Truck ends NC 86 to NC 57 – Yanceyville	Northern terminus of NC 86 Truck; east end of NC 86 Truck overlap
Orange		271.0	436.1			US 70 Bus. west – Hillsborough	
Orange	Eno	274.0	441.0		—	US 70 Bus. east	West end of freeway; eastbound exit and westbound left entrance
Orange	Eno	274.0	441.0		—	I-85 south	West end of I-85 overlap; westbound left exit and eastbound left entrance; I-85 south exit 170
Durham	Durham	276.1	444.3		172	NC 147 south – Downtown Durham, Research Triangle Park	Exit numbers follow I-85; eastbound exit and westbound entrance
Durham	Durham	277.0	445.8		173	Cole Mill Road	
Durham	Durham	277.5	446.6		174A	US 15 / US 501 south to US 70 Bus. (Hillsborough Road) / NC 147 – Chapel Hill	West end of US 15/US 501 overlap; westbound exit and eastbound entrance
Durham	Durham	278.1	447.6		174B	Hillandale Road	
Durham	Durham	278.8	448.7		175	NC 157 (Guess Road)	To NC School of Science & Math and Duke Homestead
Durham	Durham	280.0	450.6		176	US 501 north (Duke Street) / Gregson Street – Northgate	East end of US 501 overlap; signed eastbound as exits 176A (Gregson St.) and 176B (US 501)
Durham	Durham	281.0	452.2		177	US 15 Bus. south / US 501 Bus. (Roxboro Street) / NC 55 east (Avondale Drive)	To North Carolina Central University
Durham	Durham	282.0	453.8		13	I-85 / US 15 north / I-885 begins – Oxford, Petersburg, Henderson	Exit numbers follow I-885; east end of I-85/US 15 overlap; west end of I-885 overlap; no exit number eastbound; I-85 exit 178
Durham	Durham	283.0	455.4		12	Cheek Road	Exit numbers follow I-885
Durham	Durham	284.0	457.1		11	US 70 Bus. west / NC 98 – Durham, Wake Forest	Exit numbers follow I-885
Durham	Durham	284.8	458.3		288A	Carr Road	Dumbbell interchange; eastbound exit via exit 11
Durham	Durham	285.0	458.7		288B	I-885 south to NC 147 – RDU Airport	Exit 10 on I-885; east end of I-885 overlap; east end of freeway
Wake	Raleigh	292.0	469.9		292	I-540 to I-40 / US 1 – Wake Forest, RDU Airport	Interchange; I-540 exit 4; westbound access is part of exit 293
Wake	Raleigh	292.5	470.7		293	Lumley Road / Westgate Road	Interchange
Wake	Raleigh	299.0	481.2			NC 50 north – Creedmoor	West end of NC 50 overlap
Wake	Raleigh	300.0	482.8			I-440 / US 1 / Ridge Road – Sanford, Rocky Mount, Wake Forest, Wilson	Cloverleaf interchange; I-440 exit 7
Wake	Raleigh					Glenwood Avenue south / Wade Avenue west to I-40	Interchange
Wake	Raleigh	303.0	487.6			Capital Boulevard north (US 401 north)	Interchange; west end of US 401 overlap
Wake	Raleigh	303.6	488.6			Peace Street	Interchange via ramps northbound, connector road southbound
Wake	Raleigh	305.0	490.8			Martin Luther King Jr. Boulevard / Western Boulevard	Interchange
Wake	Raleigh	306.0	492.5			I-40 / US 64 – Cary, Chapel Hill, Farmers Market	I-40 exit 298
Wake	Raleigh	307.0	494.1			Wilmington Street – Downtown	Interchange; westbound exit and eastbound entrance
Wake	Garner	308.0	495.7			US 401 south – Fuquay-Varina, Fayetteville	Interchange; east end of US 401 overlap; eastbound exit and westbound left entrance
Wake	Garner	310.0	498.9			Vandora Springs Road – Shopping Center	Interchange
Wake	Garner					Aversboro Road	Right-in/right-out interchange; eastbound exit and entrance only
Wake	Garner	311.0	500.5			NC 50 south – Garner, Benson, Shopping Center	Interchange; east end of NC 50 overlap
Wake	Garner	313.0	503.7			I-40 (Tom Bradshaw Freeway) – Raleigh	I-40 exit 306
Johnston	Clayton	321.7	517.7			NC 36 west / NC 42 east	
Johnston		326.0	524.6	326	10	US 70 Bus. east / I-42 west – Smithfield	Eastern terminus of the western section of I-42
Johnston	Wilson's Mills			–	329	Swift Creek Road	Parclo interchange opened in Spring 2024
Johnston	Wilson's Mills			–	330	Wilson's Mills Road	Diamond interchange opened in Fall 2024
Johnston		333.0	535.9	–	333	Buffalo Road	
Johnston		334.0	537.5	—	—	Future I-42 east / US 70 Byp. east – Goldsboro	Eastbound left exit and westbound left entrance; future I-42 exit 16
Johnston	Selma	335.0	539.1			NC 39 north / US 301 / NC 96 – Selma, Smithfield	West end of unsigned NC 39 overlap
Johnston	Selma	335.6	540.1			I-95 – Benson, Wilson	I-95 exit 97
Johnston	Selma	335.9	540.6			NC 39 ends / US 70A east – Pine Level	East end of unsigned NC 39 overlap
Johnston		336.2	541.1			Future I-42 west / US 70 Byp. west – Raleigh	Interchange; westbound left exit and eastbound left entrance; exit 18; future I-42 exit 18
Johnston		338.0	544.0		337	US 70 Bus. west – Smithfield	
Johnston					338	Stevens Chapel Road/Davis Mill Road	
Johnston		344.0	553.6			US 70A west – Pine Level	
Wayne	Goldsboro	352.2	566.8			I-42 east	I-42 exit 34; Eastbound exit and westbound entrance
Wayne	Goldsboro	353.0	568.1			NC 581	
Wayne	Goldsboro	356.5	573.7			I-795 to US 117 south – Wilson, Wilmington	I-795 exit 25
Wayne	Goldsboro	357.0	574.5			US 70 Bus. east (Grantham Street) / US 13 / US 117 south – Goldsboro, Mount Olive, Wilmington	West end of US 13/US 117 overlap
Wayne	Goldsboro	357.5	575.3			US 117 north – Wilson, Gov. Charles B. Aycock Birthplace	Interchange; east end of US 117 overlap; eastbound exit and westbound entrance
Wayne	Goldsboro	358.0	576.1			US 117 Bus. / NC 111 north (William Street) to US 117	Interchange; west end of NC 111 overlap
Wayne	Goldsboro	359.0	577.8			Wayne Memorial Drive	Interchange
Wayne	Goldsboro	360.7	580.5			Best Road / Spence Avenue	Interchange
Wayne	Goldsboro	361.5	581.8			US 13 north (Berkeley Boulevard) – Snow Hill	Interchange; east end of US 13 overlap; to Seymour Johnson AFB
Wayne	Goldsboro	363.0	584.2			US 70 Bus. west (Ash Street)	
Wayne	Goldsboro	364.0	585.8			NC 111 south – Beulaville	East end of NC 111 overlap; to Cliffs of the Neuse State Park
Lenoir	La Grange			369	53	I-42 west	Signed westbound exit 54; current eastern terminus of I-42
Lenoir	La Grange	372.0	598.7	372	56	NC 903 – La Grange	
Lenoir	La Grange				—	Willie Measley/Jim Sutton Road	Currently an at-grade intersection; future diamond interchange
Lenoir	La Grange				—	Albert Sugg Road/Barwick Station Road	Currently an at-grade intersection; future parclo dumbbell interchange
Lenoir	Kinston				—	NC 148	Interchange; To North Carolina Global TransPark; southward extension of NC 148 planned
Lenoir	Kinston				—	US 70 Bus. east to US 258 – Kinston	Future diamond interchange
Lenoir	Kinston				—	NC 11 / NC 55 – Pink Hill, Mount Olive	Future parclo interchange
Lenoir	Kinston				—	US 258 (South Queen Street) – Snow Hill, Kinston	Future parclo interchange
Lenoir	Kinston				—	NC 58 (Trenton Highway) – Trenton	Future parclo interchange
Lenoir	Kinston	381.7	614.3			US 258 north – Snow Hill	West end of US 258 overlap
Lenoir	Kinston	382.0	614.8			US 70 Bus. east / US 258 Bus. south – Kinston	
Lenoir	Kinston	384.5	618.8			NC 11 / NC 55 (Old Pink Hill Road) – Pink Hill, Mount Olive	
Lenoir	Kinston	385.0	619.6			US 258 south / US 70 Bus. west / US 258 Bus. north / NC 58 north – Richlands, Kinston	East end of US 258 overlap; west end of NC 58 overlap
Lenoir	Kinston	386.0	621.2			NC 58 south – Trenton	East end of NC 58 overlap
Lenoir	Kinston				—	US 70 Bus. west to US 258 – Kinston	Future diamond interchange; to Lenoir Community College
Lenoir	Kinston				—	Wyse Fork Road/Caswell Station Road	Currently an at-grade intersection; future parclo interchange
Jones		393.0	632.5	–	–	Dover Road (Old US Route 70) - Dover	Currently an at-grade intersection and west end of freeway; future diamond interchange
Craven		402.0	647.0	—	84	NC 41 south (Trenton Road) – Cove City, Trenton	Northern terminus of NC 41
Craven		408.0	656.6	—	90	Tuscarora Rhems Road – Tuscarora	
Craven		411.0	661.4	409	93	Clark Road	
Craven		411.5	662.2	410A	94	US 17 south – Jacksonville	East end of US 17 overlap; US 17 exit 141
Craven		412.8	664.3	411	95	NC 43 north – Greenville, Vanceboro	Southern terminus of NC 43
Craven	New Bern	415.0	667.9	—	97	Glenburnie Road – Craven Community College	
Craven	New Bern	416.0	669.5	414	98	US 17 Bus. – New Bern, Jacksonville	
Craven	New Bern	417.7	672.2	416	100	NC 55 west / Pembroke Road – Trent Woods	West end of NC 55 overlap; exit number unsigned eastbound
Craven	Trent River			Freedom Memorial Bridge			
Craven	James City	419.0	674.3	417A-B	101A-B	US 17 north / NC 55 east / E. Front Street – New Bern, Washington, Bayboro	East end of freeway; signed separately as exits 101A (E. Front St.) and 101B (US 17/NC 55) westbound; east end of US 17/NC 55 overlap
Craven	James City				418	Williams Road	Currently an at-grade intersection; future dogbone interchange
Craven	James City				419	Airport Road	Currently an at-grade intersection; future parclo interchange
Craven	James City				420	Grantham Road	Currently an at-grade intersection; future dogbone interchange
Craven	James City				421	Taberna Way	Currently an at-grade intersection; future dogbone interchange
Craven	James City				422	Thurman Road	Currently an at-grade intersection; future dogbone interchange
Craven	James City				424	Camp Kiro Road	Currently an at-grade intersection; future dogbone interchange
Craven	Croatan				426	Fisher Avenue/Fisher Road	Currently an at-grade intersection; future dumbbell interchange
Craven	Neuse Forest				428	Stately Pines Road	Currently an at-grade intersection; future parclo dumbbell interchange
Craven	Havelock				429	US 70 Bus. east – Havelock	Trumpet interchange; western terminus of the Havelock Bypass
Craven	Havelock				434	Lake Road	Diamond interchange on the Havelock Bypass
Craven	Havelock				437	US 70 Bus. west – Havelock	Trumpet interchange; eastern terminus of the Havelock Bypass; proposed to be upgraded further to become the future western terminus of the Northern Carteret Bypass and the continuation of I-42
Carteret	Harlowe				—	NC 101 – Havelock, Beaufort	Proposed interchange on the Northern Carteret Bypass
Carteret	North River				—	To US 70 east – Otway	Proposed interchange on the Northern Carteret Bypass
Carteret	Morehead City	449.0	722.6			NC 24 west – Jacksonville	Eastern terminus of NC 24
Carteret	Morehead City	453.0	729.0			To NC 58 – Atlantic Beach	To Fort Macon State Park
Carteret	Beaufort	457.3	736.0			Turner Street	Former US 70 Bus
Carteret	Beaufort	458.0	737.1			NC 101 – Havelock	
Carteret	Beaufort				—	Northern Carteret Bypass west / Future I-42	Proposed future eastern terminus of I-42 and the Northern Carteret Bypass
Carteret	Beaufort	459.5	739.5			Live Oak Street	Former US 70 Bus
Carteret	Sea Level	483.0	777.3			NC 12 north – Cedar Island	Southern terminus of NC 12
Carteret	Atlantic	488.0	785.4			School Drive – Cedar Island	National eastern terminus; road continues as Seashore Drive
1.000 mi = 1.609 km; 1.000 km = 0.621 mi: Closed/former; Concurrency terminus; Incomplete access; Unopened

== See also ==
- Special routes of U.S. Route 70
- North Carolina Bicycle Route 7 - Briefly concurrent with US 70 near Dover and from North River Corner to NC 12

== Notes ==
U.S. Route 70
Previous state: Tennessee	North Carolina	Next state: Terminus
