= HOSFU =

Christian film company

- Industry: Film promotion
- Genre: Christian film
- Founded: 2003
- Headquarters: Albuquerque, New Mexico
- Key people: Eric S. Highland; Dr. Kolan Wright; Joseph Simmons; Brittany Hardy; Lisa Strnad

HOSFU (an acronym for His Only Son For Us) was a Christian film-related company aimed at promoting Christ through the film industry. Founded in 2003, the company's key people were Eric S. Highland, Dr. Kolan Wright, Joseph Simmons, Brittany Hardy and Lisa Strnad. It was founded with intent to spread the Gospel worldwide, and later began focusing on filmmaking and production.

HOSFU was featured on the November 2009 cover of Christian Video Magazine. The company has been heavily involved in the Gideon Media Arts Conference and Film Festival, of which concluded a short film contest. The festival also contained a screenwriting contest sponsored by Trost Moving Pictures.

== History ==
HOSFU was founded in 2003 by two couples who wanted to communicate the Gospel to people worldwide who had not heard it. Eric and Marie Highland, along with co-founders Kolan and Lisa Wright, worked on various tasks over the next five years in relation to this goal. However, it was not until 2008 that the founders understood a clear vision of what HOSFU should focus on. They felt God wanted HOSFU to work through the use of film.

Brittany Hardy joined the company full-time in Albuquerque, New Mexico during Summer 2008. After that, several more team members have been added. Dr. Wayne Barber became the company's theological advisor; Joseph Simmons, a physicist, became the Chief of Technology; and Gregory Elder began work specifically for a special project, but actively worked on HOSFU items as well.

HOSFU closed operations in July 2010 due to differences among staff leadership.

=== Gideon Media Arts Conference and Film Festival ===
Screenplay contest logo.

HOSFU was hired by Trost Moving Pictures to publicize the Raw Talent Screenplay Contest. Trost Moving Pictures awarded a $10,000 Grand Prize to Jason Parker who wrote a script titled "Matter of Life", which he received at the 2010 Gideon Media Arts Conference & Film Festival Banquet on June 7, 2010, to which Parker won an all-expense-paid trip from TMP. HOSFU and Gideon Media Arts also co-created a 2010 Short Film Contest, as part of the Gideon Media Arts Conference & Film Festival in Ridgecrest, North Carolina. Short Film Contest entires were 5–30 minutes in length, and the festival took place June 3–8, 2009. "Leave Me" won first place, followed by runner-up "Forgive Me".

Eric Highland, President and CEO of HOSFU, ran three of the workshops at Gideon Media Arts Conference and Film Festival. They were titled "Building a Fanbase with Your Fingertips Parts I and II" and "Marketing Consulting/Brainstorming Session". He also had two hours' of private sessions with Christian film producers and the Gideon's "Honored Authors". which ultimately led to them partnering on projects.

== Operations ==
Each month, HOSFU promotes a Featured Film, Featured Actor and Featured Actress from their website, Christian-Movie.com. The website was among the top 65,000 sites in the United States, according to Alexa Internet. HOSFU was featured on the November 2009 cover of Christian Video Magazine, with a two-page story about the company inside the magazine. HOSFU consulted with Cloud Ten Pictures from April–November 2009. Additionally, the company began an audio podcast in May 2010.
