= Eno, North Carolina =

- Unincorporated community
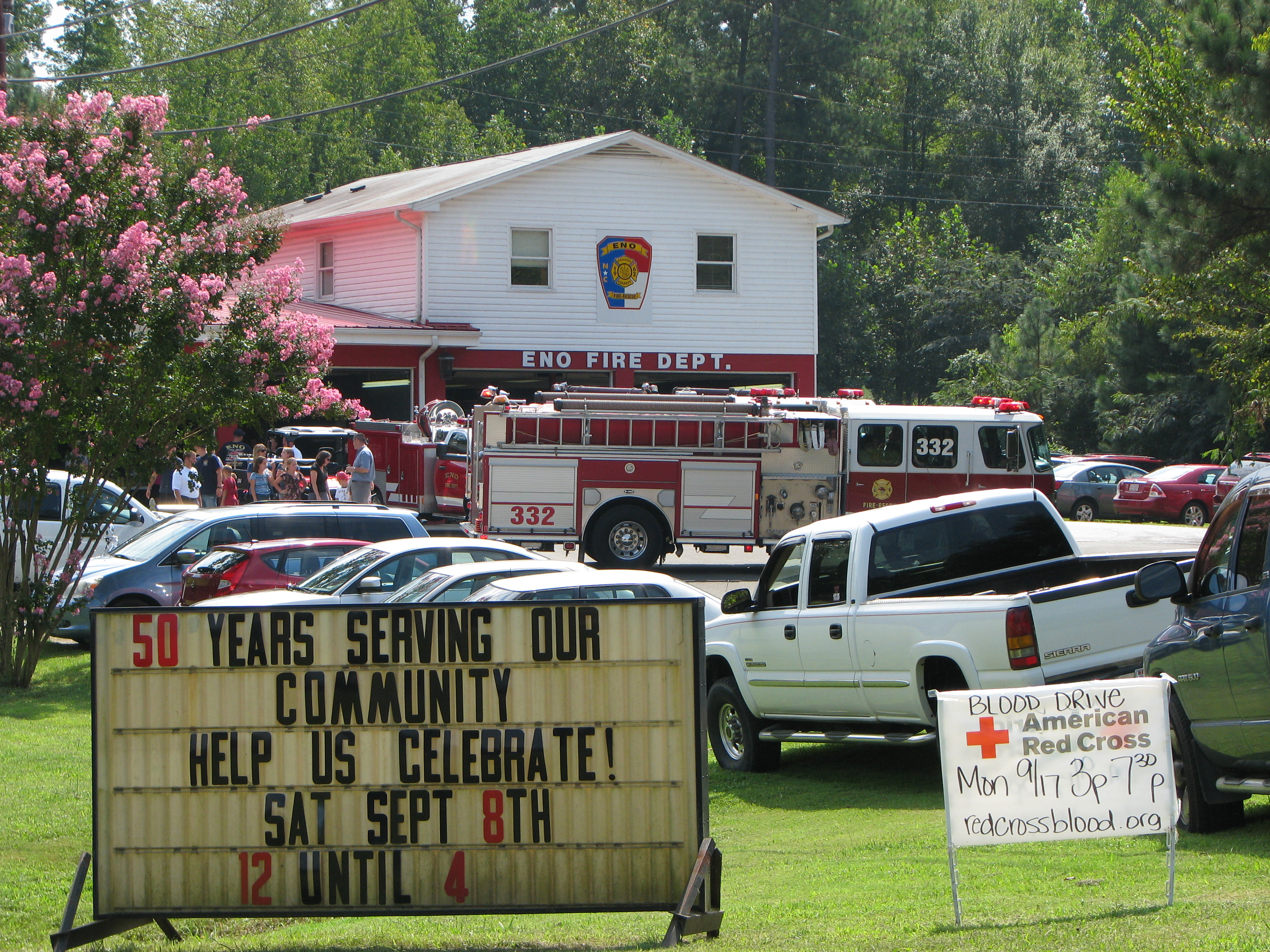
- Eno Fire Department

- Location of Eno in North Carolina Eno, North Carolina (the United States)
- Coordinates: 36°02′29″N 79°00′51″W
- Country: United States
- State: North Carolina
- County: Orange
- Elevation: 463 ft (141 m)
- Time zone: UTC-5 (Eastern (EST))
  - Summer (DST): UTC-4 (EDT)
- Area code: 919
- GNIS feature ID: 1020159

Eno is an unincorporated community in Orange County, North Carolina, United States. It is located at the intersection of Interstate 85 and U.S. Route 70.
