= Wilson's Mills, North Carolina =

- Town
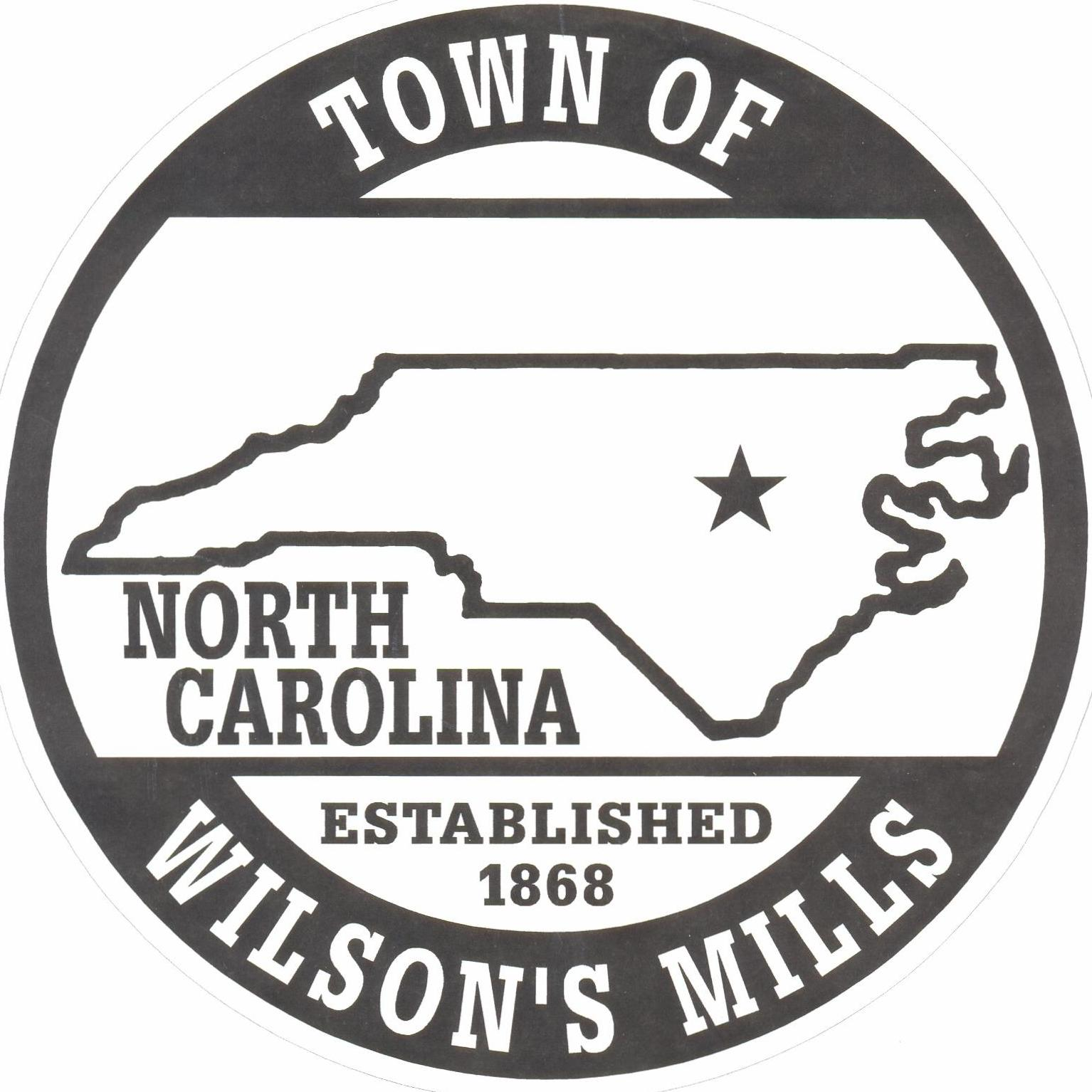
- Seal

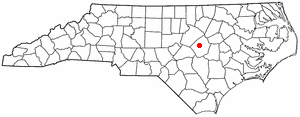
- Location of Wilsons Mills, North Carolina
- Coordinates: 35°35′09″N 78°21′56″W
- Country: United States
- State: North Carolina
- County: Johnston

Area
  - Total: 5.51 sq mi (14.28 km^{2})
  - Land: 5.51 sq mi (14.26 km^{2})
  - Water: 0.0077 sq mi (0.02 km^{2})
- Elevation: 226 ft (69 m)

Population (2020)
  - Total: 2,534
  - Density: 460.2/sq mi (177.69/km^{2})
- Time zone: UTC-5 (Eastern (EST))
  - Summer (DST): UTC-4 (EDT)
- ZIP code: 27593
- Area code: 919
- FIPS code: 37-74580
- GNIS feature ID: 2406893
- Website: www.wilsonsmillsnc.org

Wilson's Mills is a town in Johnston County, North Carolina, United States. As of the 2020 census, Wilson's Mills had a population of 2,534.

== Geography ==
Wilson's Mills is located in north-central Johnston County. It is 6 miles (10 km) north of Smithfield, the county seat. U.S. Route 70 passes through the southern side of the town, leading northwest 26 miles (42 km) to Raleigh and southeast 6 miles (10 km) to Interstate 95 at Selma.

According to the United States Census Bureau, Wilson's Mills has a total area of 4.5 square miles (11.7 km^{2}), of which 0.01 square miles (0.02 km^{2}), or 0.16%, are water.

== Demographics ==
Historical population
Census	Pop.	Note	%±
1930	350		—
2000	1,291		—
2010	2,277		76.4%
2020	2,534		11.3%
U.S. Decennial Census

=== 2020 census ===
Wilson's Mills racial composition
Race	Number	Percentage
White (non-Hispanic)	1,180	46.57%
Black or African American (non-Hispanic)	493	19.46%
Native American	11	0.43%
Asian	6	0.24%
Other/Mixed	77	3.04%
Hispanic or Latino	767	30.27%

As of the 2020 census, Wilson's Mills had a population of 2,534. The median age was 35.3 years. 26.5% of residents were under the age of 18 and 12.5% of residents were 65 years of age or older. For every 100 females there were 94.5 males, and for every 100 females age 18 and over there were 94.6 males age 18 and over.

7.1% of residents lived in urban areas, while 92.9% lived in rural areas.

There were 915 households in Wilson's Mills, of which 38.8% had children under the age of 18 living in them. Of all households, 53.1% were married-couple households, 15.7% were households with a male householder and no spouse or partner present, and 23.4% were households with a female householder and no spouse or partner present. About 20.0% of all households were made up of individuals and 8.1% had someone living alone who was 65 years of age or older. There were 648 families residing in the town.

There were 958 housing units, of which 4.5% were vacant. The homeowner vacancy rate was 0.7% and the rental vacancy rate was 7.1%.

=== 2000 census ===
As of the census of 2000, there were 1,291 people, 465 households, and 357 families residing in the town. The population density was 352.9 inhabitants per square mile (136.3/km^{2}). There were 505 housing units at an average density of 138.0 per square mile (53.3/km^{2}). The racial makeup of the town was 73.04% White, 23.93% African American, 0.54% Native American, 2.32% from other races, and 0.15% from two or more races. Hispanic or Latino of any race were 4.88% of the population.

There were 465 households, of which 41.7% had children under the age of 18 living with them, 60.2% were married couples living together, 12.7% had a female householder with no husband present, and 23.2% were non-families. 19.8% of all households were made up of individuals, and 7.3% had someone living alone who was 65 years of age or older. The average household size was 2.78 and the average family size was 3.19.

In the town, the population was spread out, with 30.1% under the age of 18, 6.9% from 18 to 24, 35.8% from 25 to 44, 20.6% from 45 to 64, and 6.6% who were 65 years of age or older. The median age was 32 years. For every 100 females, there were 99.8 males. For every 100 females age 18 and over, there were 94.4 males.

The median income for a household in the town was $44,650, and the median income for a family was $49,219. Males had a median income of $33,150 versus $25,188 for females. The per capita income for the town was $17,157. About 9.4% of families and 9.8% of the population were below the poverty line, including 14.0% of those under age 18 and 9.1% of those age 65 or over.

== Law and government ==
Wilson's Mills operates under a council-manager government. The town council consists of the mayor and five council members. All council members are elected at-large.

== Education ==
- Wilson's Mills Elementary School
- Wilson's Mills High School
