= Ridgecrest, North Carolina =

Unincorporated community in North Carolina, US

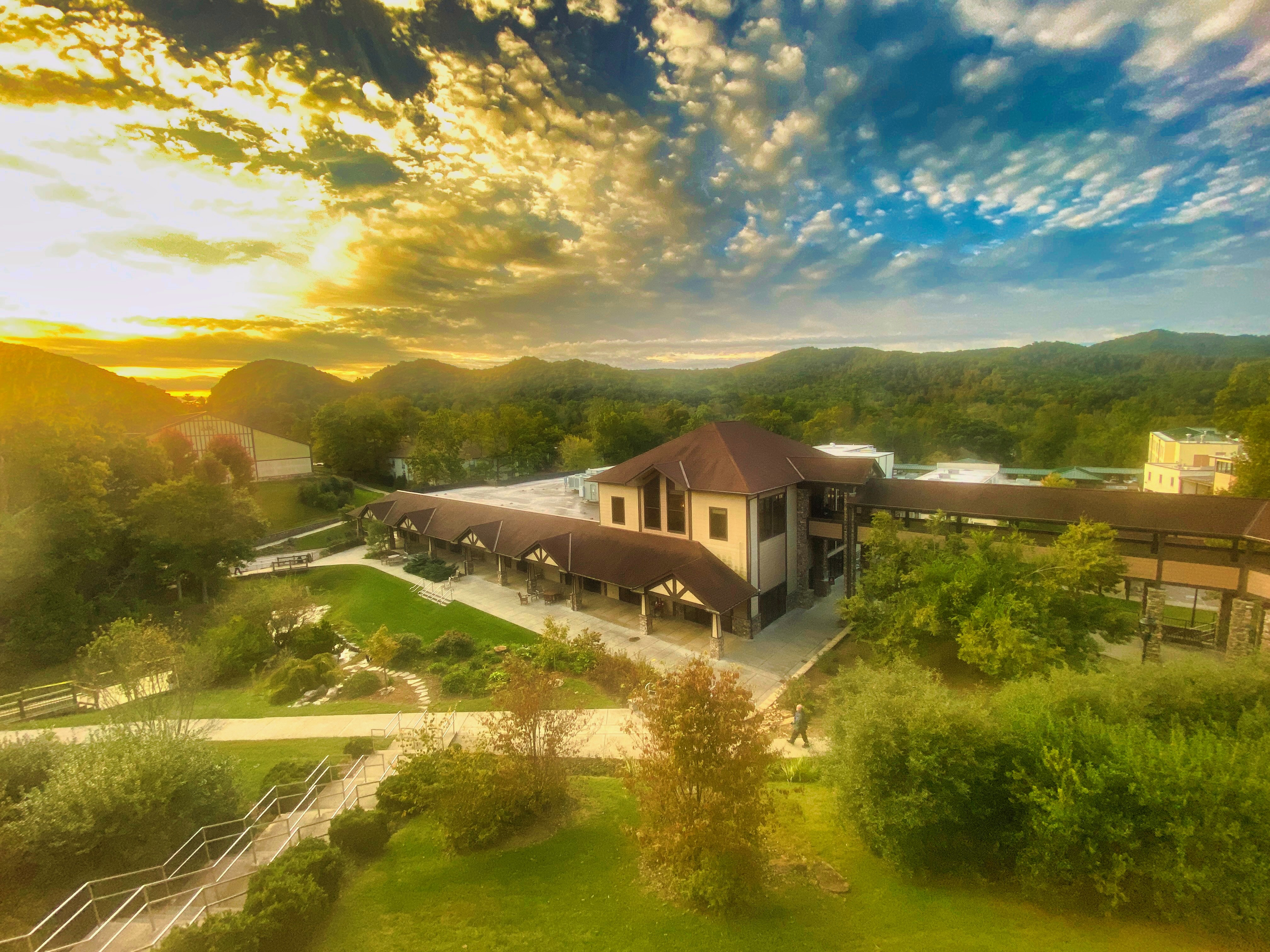
Ridgecrest Conference Center was established in 1907.

Ridgecrest is an unincorporated community in eastern Buncombe County, North Carolina, United States, off Interstate 40/U.S. Route 70. The community is part of the Asheville Metropolitan Statistical Area. It is home to Ridgecrest Conference Center (established 1907), Camp Ridgecrest for Boys (established 1929) and Camp Crestridge for Girls (established 1955). All three facilities are operated by the newly founded Ridgecrest Foundation and are affiliated with the Southern Baptist Convention. The conference center and summer camps were purchased by the Ridgecrest Foundation on December 30, 2020. Both summer camps are run under the direction of Phil Berry.

== Geography ==
Ridgecrest is located at coordinates 35°37′14″N 82°16′57″W, approximately 1.91 miles (3.07 km) east-northeast of Black Mountain, 6.38 miles (10.27 km) west-northwest of Old Fort, 6.37 miles (10.25 km) northeast of Swannanoa, 15 miles (24 km) east-northeast of Asheville and 367 miles (591 km) southwest of Washington, D.C. The ZIP Code for Ridgecrest is 28711.
