= Dover, North Carolina =

- Town
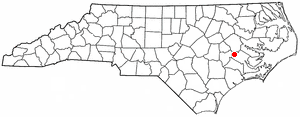
- Location of Dover, North Carolina
- Coordinates: 35°12′56″N 77°26′02″W
- Country: United States
- State: North Carolina
- County: Craven

Area
  - Total: 0.96 sq mi (2.49 km^{2})
  - Land: 0.96 sq mi (2.49 km^{2})
  - Water: 0 sq mi (0.00 km^{2})
- Elevation: 62 ft (19 m)

Population (2020)
  - Total: 349
  - Density: 363.7/sq mi (140.43/km^{2})
- Time zone: UTC-5 (Eastern (EST))
  - Summer (DST): UTC-4 (EDT)
- ZIP code: 28526
- Area code: 252
- FIPS code: 37-17660
- GNIS feature ID: 2406391

Dover is a town in Craven County, North Carolina, United States. As of the 2020 census, Dover had a population of 349. It is part of the New Bern, North Carolina Metropolitan Statistical Area.

== Geography ==
According to the United States Census Bureau, the town has a total area of 0.9 square miles (2.3 km^{2}), all land.

== Demographics ==
Historical population
Census	Pop.	Note	%±
1910	737		—
1920	670		−9.1%
1930	621		−7.3%
1940	623		0.3%
1950	638		2.4%
1960	651		2.0%
1970	585		−10.1%
1980	600		2.6%
1990	451		−24.8%
2000	443		−1.8%
2010	401		−9.5%
2020	349		−13.0%
U.S. Decennial Census

=== 2020 census ===
Dover racial composition
Race	Number	Percentage
White (non-Hispanic)	156	44.7%
Black or African American (non-Hispanic)	173	49.57%
Other/Mixed	15	4.3%
Hispanic or Latino	5	1.43%

As of the 2020 United States census, there were 349 people, 123 households, and 62 families residing in the town.

=== 2000 census ===
As of the census of 2000, there were 443 people, 185 households, and 135 families residing in the town. The population density was 466.3 inhabitants per square mile (180.0/km^{2}). There were 214 housing units at an average density of 225.3 per square mile (87.0/km^{2}). The racial makeup of the town was 45.82% White, 53.95% African American and 0.23% Native American.

There were 185 households, out of which 23.2% had children under the age of 18 living with them, 52.4% were married couples living together, 17.8% had a female householder with no husband present, and 26.5% were non-families. 22.7% of all households were made up of individuals, and 11.4% had someone living alone who was 65 years of age or older. The average household size was 2.39 and the average family size was 2.82.

In the town, the population was spread out, with 22.1% under the age of 18, 5.9% from 18 to 24, 26.6% from 25 to 44, 27.1% from 45 to 64, and 18.3% who were 65 years of age or older. The median age was 42 years. For every 100 females, there were 79.4 males. For every 100 females age 18 and over, there were 79.7 males.

The median income for a household in the town was $25,156, and the median income for a family was $38,125. Males had a median income of $28,750 versus $20,446 for females. The per capita income for the town was $14,384. About 15.6% of families and 20.1% of the population were below the poverty line, including 31.5% of those under age 18 and 22.2% of those age 65 or over.
