= North Carolina State Ports Authority =

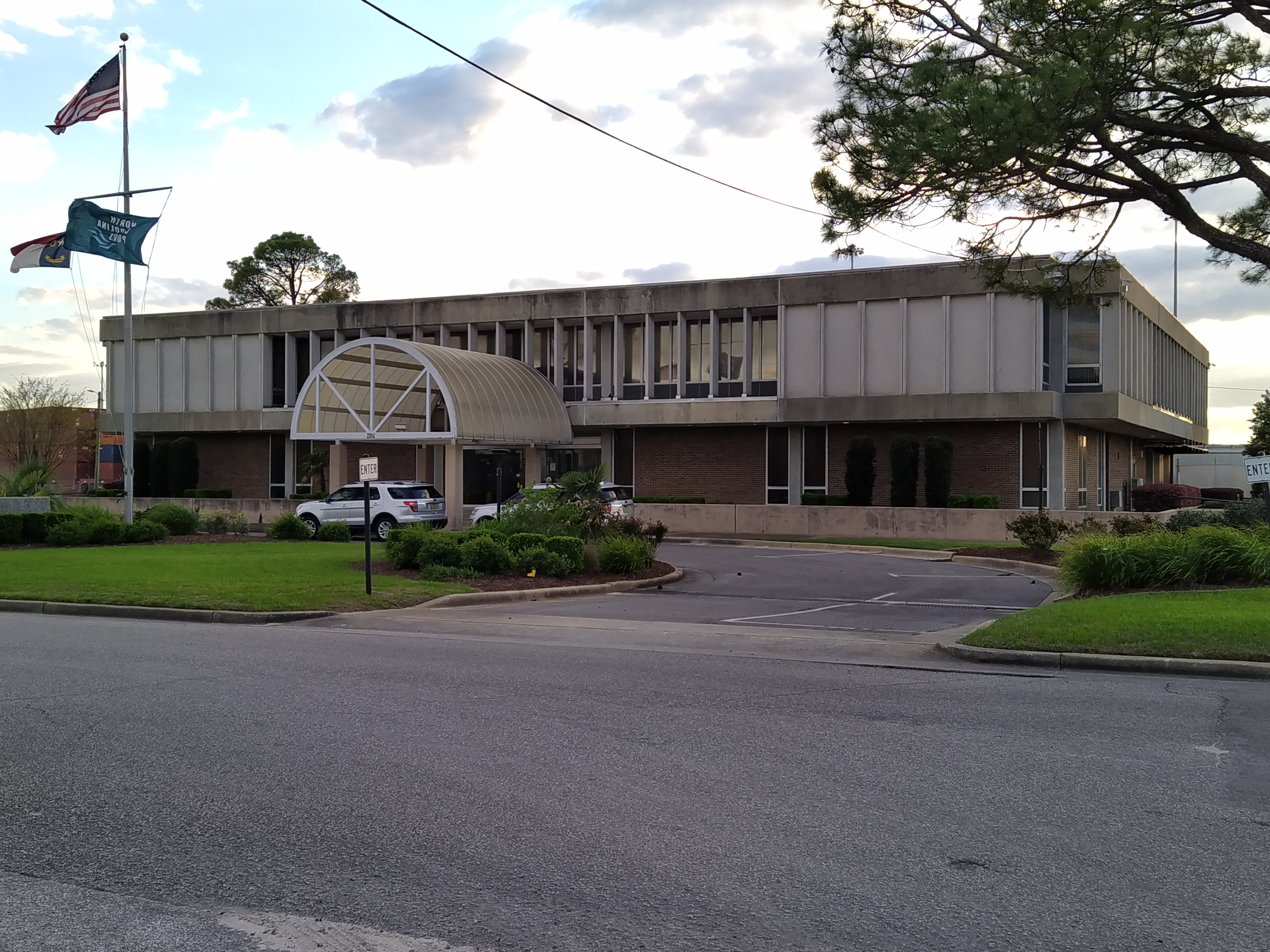
- Authority headquarters located next to the Port of Wilmington
- Founded: 1945
- Headquarters: Wilmington, North Carolina
- Website: https://ncports.com/

The North Carolina State Ports Authority (SPA) is an authority set up by the state of North Carolina to develop and operate seaports in Wilmington and Morehead City as well as an inland port located in Charlotte.

== History ==
In 1923 North Carolina Governor Cameron Morrison became interested in establishing official port facilities for the state and pushed for the creation of the State Ship and Water Transportation Commission to study the matter. The body produced a report which recommended that the state government fund the development of port facilities. The following year it was replaced by the Ports Commission, which was supposed to oversee the work. A statewide bond referendum for $8.7 million to develop the facilities failed to pass in November 1924, and the commission disbanded. Despite this, the coastal cities of Wilmington and Morehead City pursued their efforts to improve port facilities, and the North Carolina General Assembly incorporated the Morehead City Port Commission in 1933 and the Wilmington Port Commission in 1935.

The General Assembly established the North Carolina State Ports Authority in 1945 to develop and improve harbors at Wilmington, Morehead City, Southport, and other coastal areas. Improvements began in 1949, and new piers and storage areas were completed in 1952. In January 1984 the authority opened an intermodal transit terminal in Charlotte, whereby containerized goods delivered on trucks could be consolidated as rail freight and shipped to Wilmington. In the 1990s and early 2000s, the authority oversaw a $440 million project to deepen the Cape Fear River shipping channel and purchased Radio Island in Morehead City.

== Facilities ==
North Carolina State Ports Authority facility locations along the coast. Not pictured: Charlotte Inland Port
1 Port of Wilmington
2 Port of Morehead City

=== Port of Wilmington ===
The Port of Wilmington offers terminal facilities serving container, bulk, breakbulk, and ro-ro (roll-on/roll-off) operations. It offers a deep 42-foot navigational channel, nine berths, four post-Panamax, and three neo-Panamax container cranes. Modern transit and warehouse facilities and the latest cargo management technology produce a broad platform for supporting international trade.

=== Port of Morehead City ===
The Port of Morehead City is a breakbulk and bulk facility located four miles from the Atlantic Ocean. The port is equipped with nine berths and multiple gantry cranes. Storage offerings include a dry-bulk facility with a 220,000-ton capacity warehouse and a 177,000-square-foot warehouse for housing commodities like rubber, paper, steel, and lumber. Altogether there are more than one million square feet of storage.

=== Charlotte Inland Port ===
The Charlotte inland port is a 20-acre dry port site located along the CSX rail lines near the intersection of NC 16 and I-85. It serves as a distribution point for intermodal containers connecting the I-85 and I-77 corridors to the CSX rail line and the Port of Wilmington.

== Governance ==
An 11-member Board of Directors governs the North Carolina State Ports Authority. Of the Board, six members are appointed by the Governor, the North Carolina General Assembly appoints four, and the North Carolina Secretary of Transportation fills the last position. North Carolina Ports is a corporate body receiving no direct taxpayer subsidy.

=== Leadership ===
- Brian E. Clark - Executive Director
- Doug Vogt - Chief Operating Officer
- Hans Bean - Chief Commercial Officer
- Jonathan Graham - Chief Financial Officer
- Laura Blair - Vice President of Administration and External Affairs
- John Dittmar - Director of Safety and Security
