= Cove City, North Carolina =

- Town
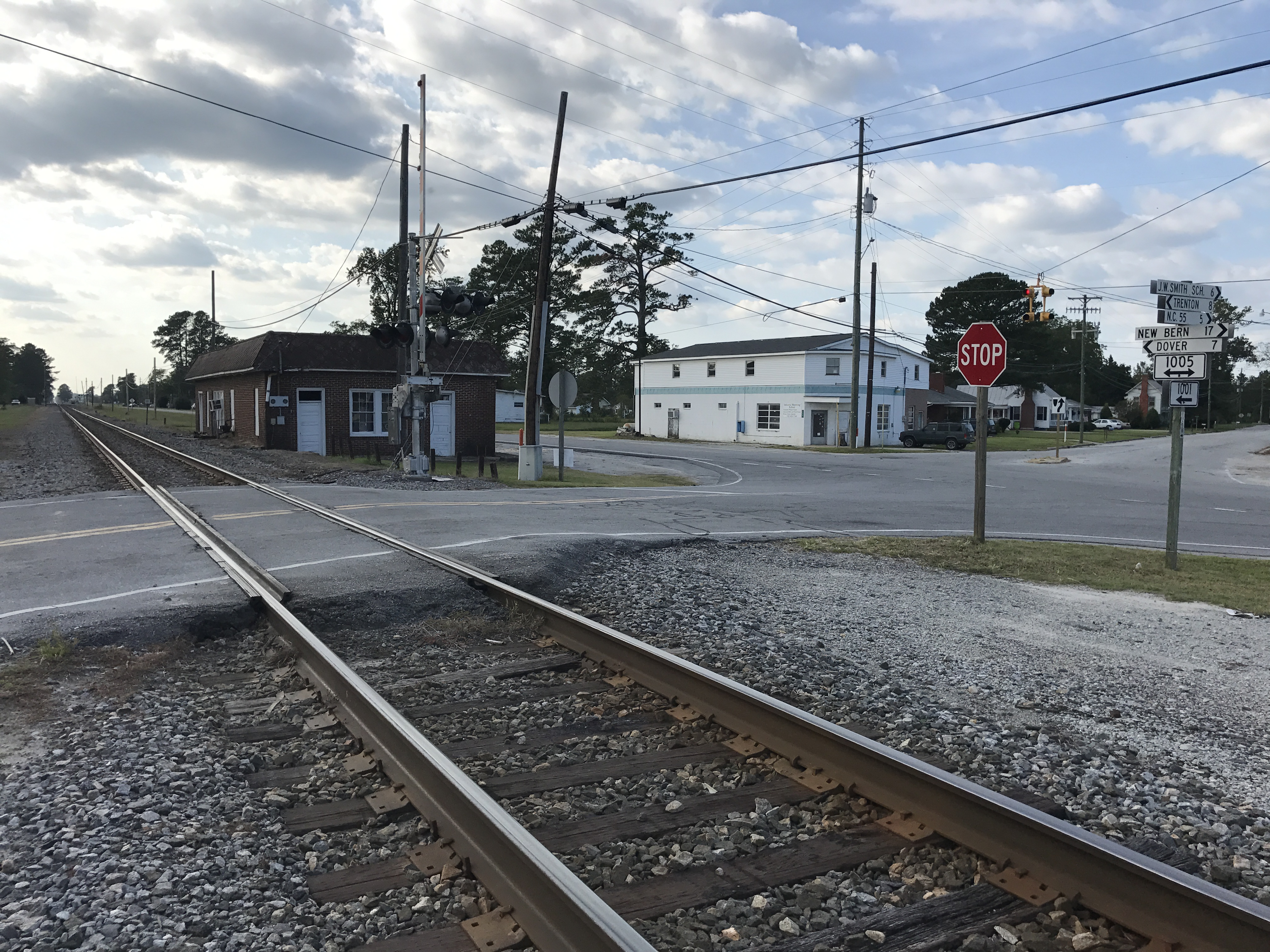
- Crossroads in Cove City

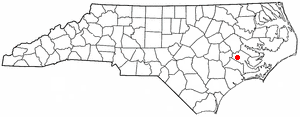
- Location of Cove City, North Carolina
- Coordinates: 35°11′20″N 77°19′14″W
- Country: United States
- State: North Carolina
- County: Craven

Area
  - Total: 0.64 sq mi (1.65 km^{2})
  - Land: 0.64 sq mi (1.65 km^{2})
  - Water: 0 sq mi (0.00 km^{2})
- Elevation: 49 ft (15 m)

Population (2020)
  - Total: 378
  - Density: 592.8/sq mi (228.88/km^{2})
- Time zone: UTC-5 (Eastern (EST))
  - Summer (DST): UTC-4 (EDT)
- ZIP code: 28523
- Area code: 252
- FIPS code: 37-15020
- GNIS feature ID: 2406327

Cove City is a town in Craven County, North Carolina, United States. The population was 378 at the 2020 U.S. census. It is part of the New Bern micropolitan area.

== History ==
Cove City was settled in the early 1700s. It may have been named for the Coree Indians. Cove City was incorporated in 1905. The incorporation was discontinued, and a town charter was activated in 1957.

== Geography ==
According to the United States Census Bureau, the town has a total area of 0.6 square miles (1.6 km^{2}), all land.

== Demographics ==
Historical population
| Census | Pop. | Note | %± |
|---|---|---|---|
| 1910 | 308 | | — |
| 1920 | 258 | | −16.2% |
| 1930 | 194 | | −24.8% |
| 1940 | 371 | | 91.2% |
| 1950 | 465 | | 25.3% |
| 1960 | 551 | | 18.5% |
| 1970 | 485 | | −12.0% |
| 1980 | 500 | | 3.1% |
| 1990 | 497 | | −0.6% |
| 2000 | 433 | | −12.9% |
| 2010 | 399 | | −7.9% |
| 2020 | 378 | | −5.3% |
U.S. Decennial Census

=== 2020 census ===
Cove City racial composition
| Race | Number | Percentage |
|---|---|---|
| White (non-Hispanic) | 197 | 52.12% |
| Black or African American (non-Hispanic) | 144 | 38.1% |
| Native American | 1 | 0.26% |
| Other/Mixed | 15 | 3.97% |
| Hispanic or Latino | 21 | 5.56% |

As of the 2020 United States census, there were 378 people, 192 households, and 123 families residing in the town.

=== 2000 census ===
As of the census of 2000, there were 433 people, 182 households, and 135 families residing in the town. The population density was 680.0 inhabitants per square mile (262.5/km^{2}). There were 195 housing units at an average density of 306.2 per square mile (118.2/km^{2}). The racial makeup of the town was 51.96% White, 46.88% African American, 0.23% Native American, 0.46% Asian, 0.23% from other races, and 0.23% from two or more races. Hispanic or Latino of any race were 0.69% of the population.

There were 182 households, out of which 20.9% had children under the age of 18 living with them, 54.4% were married couples living together, 13.2% had a female householder with no husband present, and 25.8% were non-families. 24.2% of all households were made up of individuals, and 12.1% had someone living alone who was 65 years of age or older. The average household size was 2.38 and the average family size was 2.81.

In the town, the population was spread out, with 19.9% under the age of 18, 7.6% from 18 to 24, 21.5% from 25 to 44, 31.2% from 45 to 64, and 19.9% who were 65 years of age or older. The median age was 45 years. For every 100 females, there were 93.3 males. For every 100 females age 18 and over, there were 89.6 males.

The median income for a household in the town was $26,875, and the median income for a family was $33,438. Males had a median income of $26,042 versus $21,250 for females. The per capita income for the town was $13,893. About 14.0% of families and 14.0% of the population were below the poverty line, including 12.4% of those under age 18 and 19.5% of those age 65 or over.

== Education ==
- James W. Smith Elementary School
