= Historic Albemarle Tour =

Road tour in North Carolina

Route information
- Maintained by NCDOT
- Existed: 1975–present

Location
- Country: United States
- State: North Carolina
- Counties: Bertie, Beaufort, Camden, Chowan, Currituck, Dare, Edgecombe, Gates, Halifax, Hertford, Hyde, Martin, Northampton, Pasquotank, Perquimans, Tyrrell, Washington

Highway system
- Auto trails; North Carolina Highway System; Interstate; US; State; Scenic

The Historic Albemarle Tour or Historic Albemarle Highway is a tour route located in northeastern North Carolina. The tour follows several U.S. and State highways in the seventeen county region, identifying historic sites and towns, marked with brown signs with the George Monck, 1st Duke of Albemarle coat of arms.

== Route description ==
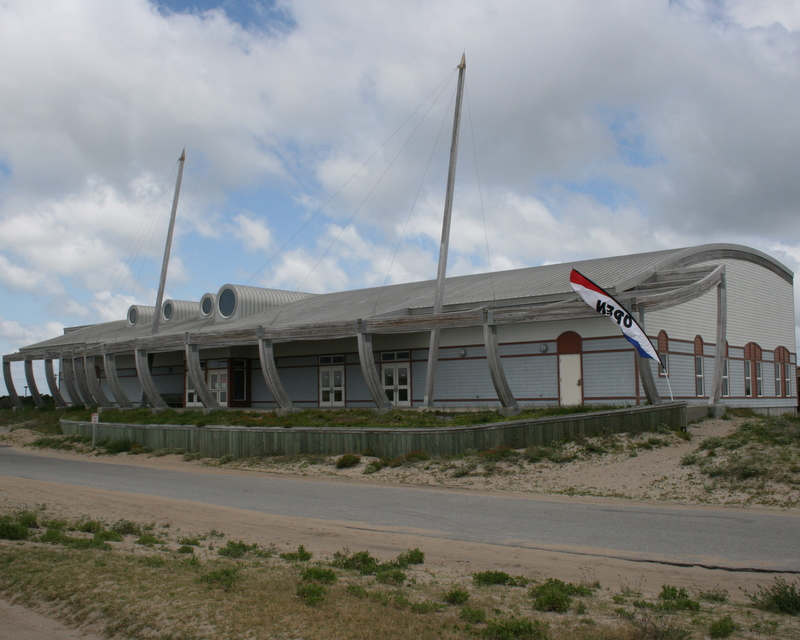
Graveyard of the Atlantic Museum in Hatteras Village

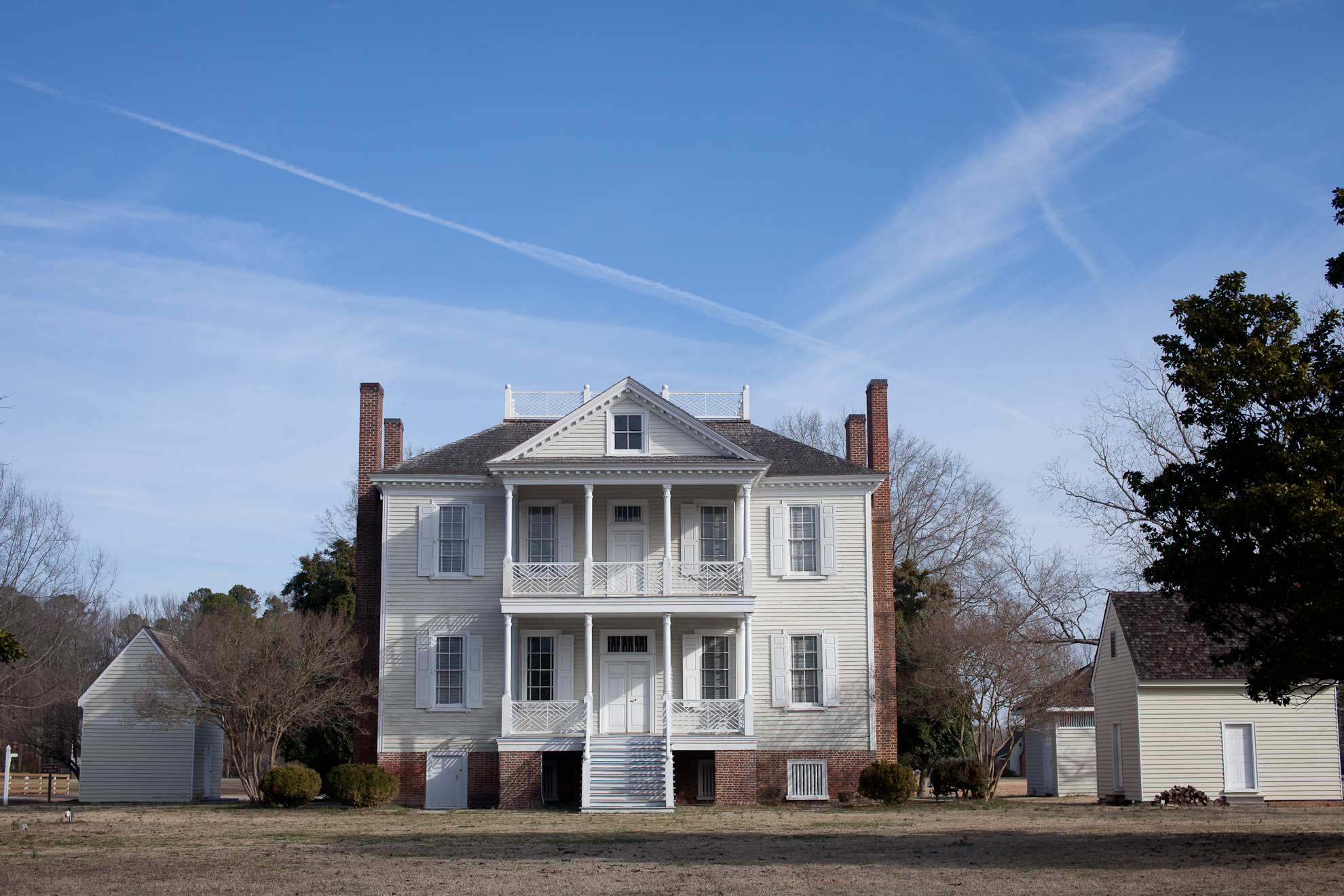
Manor House of Hope Plantation near Windsor

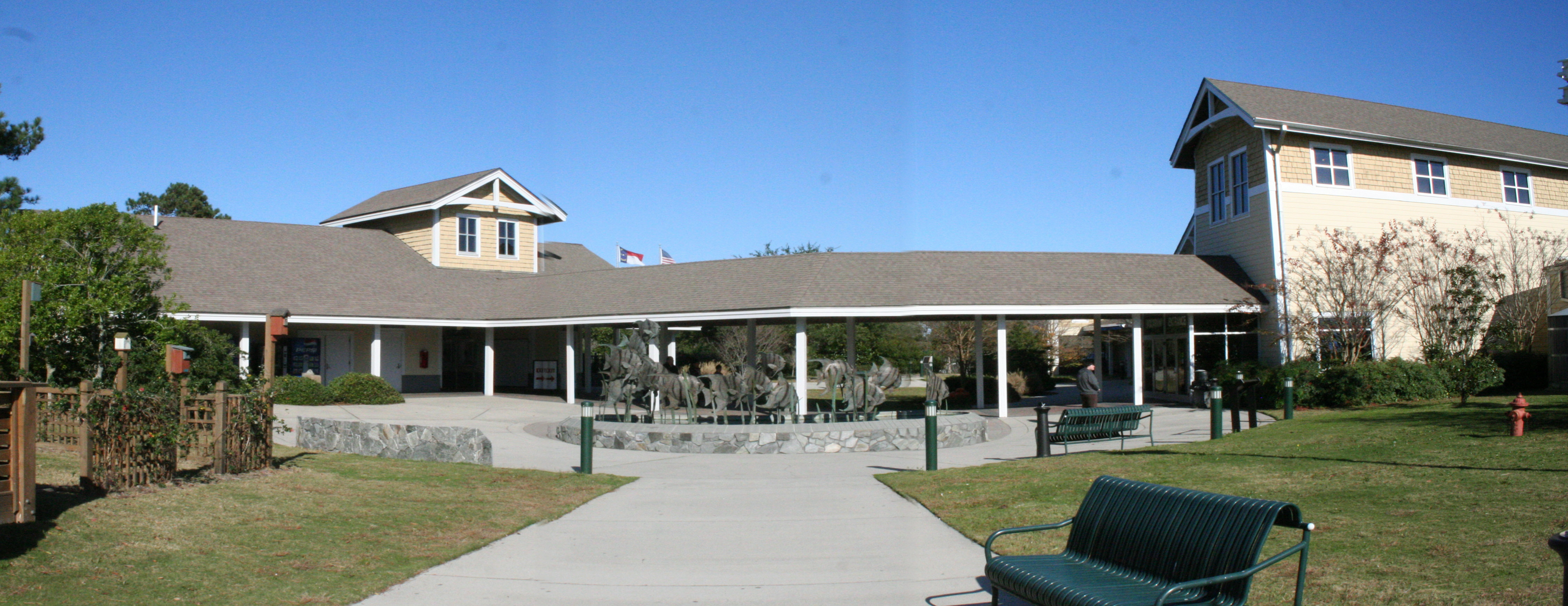
North Carolina Aquarium on Roanoke Island near Manteo, North Carolina

The tour route is not a linear route, like most scenic routes, but a collection of several highways in the region. The following list are the component highways that make-up the tour route:

Highway	Route	Sites of Interest
US 13	Williamston–VA state line	
US 17	Washington–VA state line	
US 64	Williamston–Whalebone Junction	
US 158	Barco–Whalebone Junction	
US 258	NC 561–VA state line	
US 264	Washington–Whalebone Junction	
US 301	Halifax–VA state line	
NC 11	Pitt-Martin county line–Murfreesboro	
NC 32	NC 99–VA state line	
NC 34	Barco–Sligo	
NC 37	US 64–US 17	
NC 92	US 264–NC 99/NC 306	
NC 99	Pantego–NC 32	
NC 168	Sligo–VA state line	
NC 308	US 13–US 258/NC 561	
NC 561	US 301–US 258	

=== Sites ===
- Aurora Fossil Museum
- Bath, the oldest continuously inhabited town in North Carolina
- Belhaven Memorial Museum, currently housed in Belhaven City Hall, in the town of Belhaven
- Camden County Welcome Center, located on the Dismal Swamp Canal
- Chicamacomico Life-Saving Station located in Rodanthe
- Columbia
- Corolla, location of the Currituck Beach Light
- Edenton, former colonial capital of the province of North Carolina
- Elizabeth City
- Frisco Native American Museum in Frisco, North Carolina
- Graveyard of the Atlantic Museum in Hatteras Village
- Halifax, location of the Fourth Provincial Congress, which authorized the Halifax Resolves
- Hertford
- Hope Plantation, a restored antebellum plantation house near Windsor
- Jackson
- Museum of the Albemarle
- North Carolina Aquariums with locations in Manteo, Fort Fisher, and Pine Knoll Shores
- Ocracoke
- Plymouth
- Roanoke Island Festival Park in Manteo
- Somerset Place, a restored antebellum plantation house near Creswell
- Tarboro
- Williamston
- Windsor

== History ==
The tour route was established in 1975 by the North Carolina General Assembly, which included designated highways, locations and signage. A 1977 act amended the original law to expand the list of designated highways and locations.
