= North Carolina Highway 113 =

State highway in North Carolina, US

North Carolina Highway 113

Route information
- Maintained by NCDOT
- Length: 11.2 mi (18.0 km)
- Existed: 1964–present

Major junctions
- South end: NC 18 in Laurel Springs
- US 221 in Scottville
- North end: NC 93 in Piney Creek

Location
- Country: United States
- State: North Carolina
- Counties: Alleghany, Ashe

Highway system
- North Carolina Highway System; Interstate; US; State; Scenic
← NC 112	→ NC 114

North Carolina Highway 113 (NC 113) is a primary state highway in the U.S. state of North Carolina. It runs from NC 18 in the community of Laurel Springs, to NC 93 in the community of Piney Creek.

== Route description ==
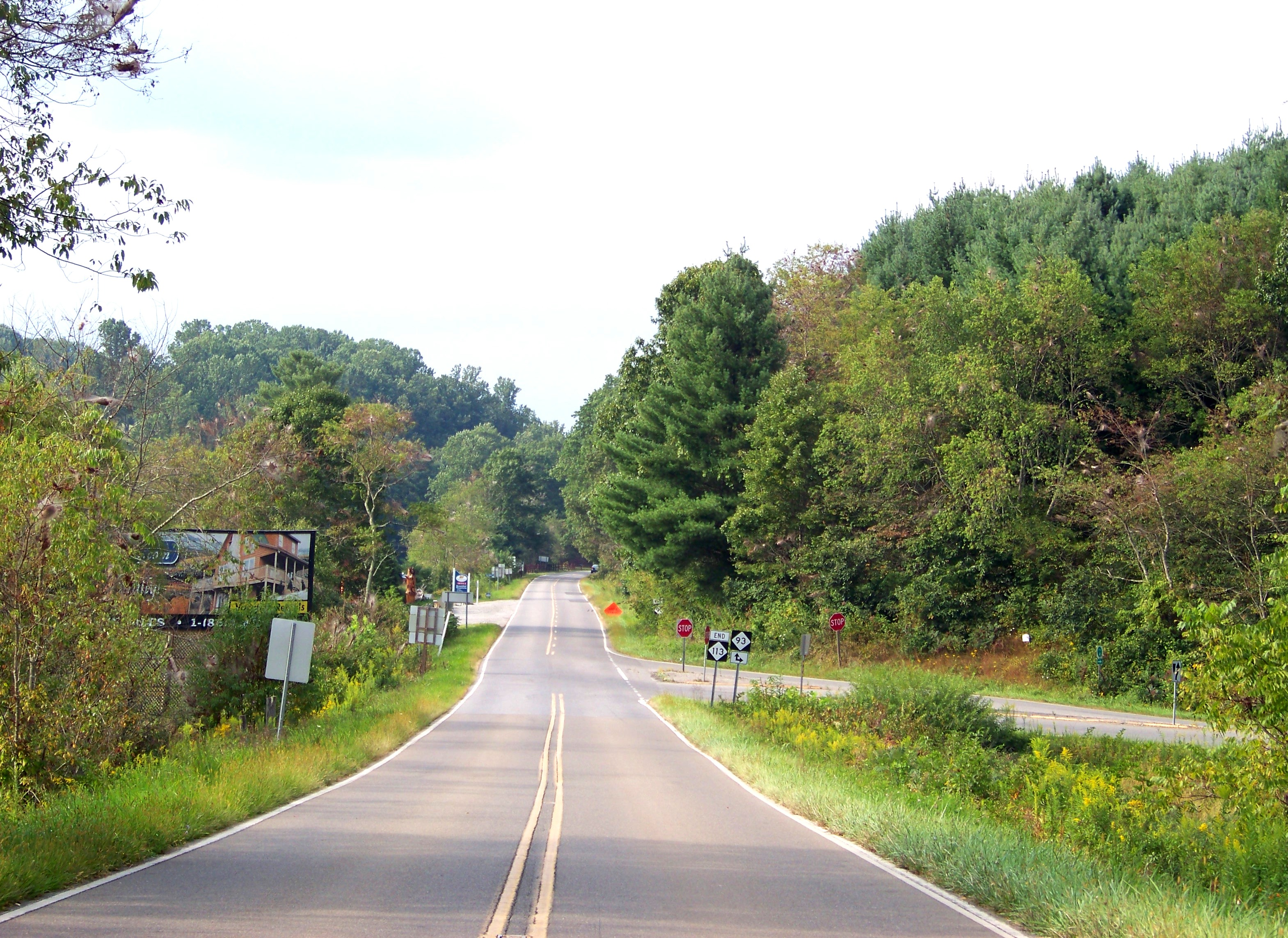
Northern terminus at Piney Creek

NC 113 is an exceptionally straight road in the area; the highway serves as a connector to Virginia from either NC 18 or U.S. Route 221 (US 221). Nearby New River State Park can be accessed by either via US 221 or South Fork Church Road. The Blue Ridge Parkway is 2.8 miles (4.5 km) south on NC 18. From Weigh Station Road to George Shepherd Road, the road straddles the Ashe/Alleghany county line for 1.8 miles (2.9 km).

== History ==
NC 113 was established in 1930 as a primary new routing from Toluca to Newton. In late 1934, it was renumbered to NC 73 (replaced in 1940 by the current NC 10). NC 113 returned in 1937 as a renumbered route through Halifax when US 301 was rerouted to bypass the city. It was renumbered, around 1960, as US 301A (today as US 301 Business).

The third, and current, NC 113 was established in 1964, which was extended further north in 1977 to its current terminus after NC 93 was also rerouted further north.

== Junction list ==
County	Location	mi	km	Destinations	Notes
Alleghany	Laurel Springs	0.0	0.0	NC 18 / Elk Knob Road – Sparta, North Wilkesboro	
Alleghany	Scottville	4.8	7.7	US 221 – Twin Oaks, Jefferson	To New River State Park headquarters
Alleghany	Piney Creek	11.2	18.0	NC 93 – Twin Oaks, Mouth of Wilson	
1.000 mi = 1.609 km; 1.000 km = 0.621 mi
