= North Carolina Highway 101 =

State highway in North Carolina, US

North Carolina Highway 101

Route information
- Maintained by NCDOT
- Length: 22.2 mi (35.7 km)
- Existed: 1928–present

Major junctions
- West end: US 70 Bus. in Havelock
- NC 306 near Havelock; US 70 in Beaufort
- East end: Live Oak Street in Beaufort

Location
- Country: United States
- State: North Carolina
- Counties: Craven, Carteret

Highway system
- North Carolina Highway System; Interstate; US; State; Scenic
← NC 100	→ NC 102

North Carolina Highway 101 (NC 101) is a primary state highway in the U.S. state of North Carolina that serves as a shortcut for U.S. Route 70 (US 70). It links Havelock to Beaufort, bypassing Morehead City. Most of the area along NC 101 is rural with many farms and swamps.

== Route description ==
NC 101 eastbound

NC 101 begins at a traffic light along US 70 Business in Havelock. NC 101 continues east from US 70 Business along Fontana Boulevard south of the Cherry Point Military Base. As NC 101 continues eastward it passes farms and forest along the routing. NC 101 meets up with the southern terminus of NC 306 south of the Minnesott Beach Ferry. At this point, the highway becomes concurrent with North Carolina Bicycle Route 7. NC 101 continues three miles (4.8 km) to the east before reaching North Harlowe at the edge of the Croatan National Forest. NC 101 then turns south to cross into Carteret County. After three more miles NC 101 enters the town of Harlowe. NC 101 turns eastward and leaves the Croatan National Forest before crossing the Intracoastal Waterway near Core Point.

After crossing the Intracoastal Waterway, NC 101 heads a southeastern direction towards Beaufort. The concurrency with Bike Route 7 ends at Laurel Road south of the Intracoastal Waterway. NC 101 parallels the Intracoastal waterway the rest of the way, passing waterfront neighborhoods on the west side of the road and farms on the east side. As NC 101 enters Beaufort, it passes to the east of Michael J. Smith Field and reaches an intersection with US 70 opened in late January 2018. NC 101 ends at a stop sign with Live Oak Street in Beaufort.

== History ==
NC 101 was an original state highway appearing on a 1922 state map of North Carolina. NC 101 started at former NC 10 south of Havelock. NC 101 then went southeast through the town of Newport, and the communities of Mansfield and Wildwood. NC 101 had its eastern terminus in Morehead City. In 1928 NC 10 and NC 101 swapped routing. When NC 10 and US 70 were extended to Atlantic in 1931, NC 101 was truncated east of Beaufort. The routing has been the same since 1931.

== Major intersections ==
County	Location	mi	km	Destinations	Notes
Craven	Havelock	0.0	0.0	US 70 Bus. (Main Street) / Miller Boulevard – New Bern	Western terminus
Craven		5.3	8.5	NC 306 north (Ferry Road) – Minnesott Beach	Southern terminus of NC 306
Carteret	Beaufort	21.6	34.8	US 70 – Atlantic, Morehead City	
Carteret	Beaufort	22.2	35.7	Live Oak Street	Eastern terminus
1.000 mi = 1.609 km; 1.000 km = 0.621 mi
