= North Carolina Highway 18 =

State highway in North Carolina, US

North Carolina Highway 18

- Route of NC 18 highlighted in red

Route information
- Maintained by NCDOT
- Length: 145.5 mi (234.2 km)
- Existed: 1921–present

Major junctions
- South end: SC 18 at the South Carolina state line near Earl
- US 74 / NC 226 in Shelby; I-40 in Morganton; US 70 in Morganton; US 64 in Morganton; US 321 in Lenoir; US 64 / NC 90 in Lenoir; US 421 / NC 16 in Wilkesboro; US 21 in Sparta
- North end: NC 89 near Lowgap

Location
- Country: United States
- State: North Carolina
- Counties: Cleveland, Lincoln, Catawba, Burke, Caldwell, Wilkes, Alleghany, Surry

Highway system
- North Carolina Highway System; Interstate; US; State; Scenic
← US 17	→ US 19

North Carolina Highway 18 (NC 18) is a primary state highway in the U.S. state of North Carolina. Traveling north–south through the Foothills region, it connects the cities of Shelby, Morganton, Lenoir, Wilkesboro and North Wilkesboro.

== Route description ==
View north along NC 18 past US 74/NC 226 in Shelby

NC 18 is a predominantly two-lane rural highway that travels 145.5 miles (234.2 km) in western North Carolina. Starting as a continuation of SC 18, at the South Carolina state line near Earl, NC 18 travels north into Shelby, where it overlaps with NC 150 and crosses US 74/NC 226. North of Shelby, it goes through the towns of Fallston and Belwood, before entering Lincoln County. At Toluca, it connects with NC 27; at Laurel Hill, it overlaps briefly with NC 10, before entering Catawba County. With no major interchanges in Catawba County, it enters Burke County and goes northwesterly towards Morganton.

Entering Morganton from the southeast, it crosses under I-40 (exit 105) and follows Sterling Street into the downtown area. After passing US 70 (Fleming Drive), the highway splits along one-way streets, via Green Street (northbound) and Sterling Street (southbound). At Meeting Street, NC 181 begins and also joins US 64 Business. At Avery Street, NC 181 continues along Green Street towards Linville. Near the Catawba River, NC 18 connects with mainline US 64 at Sanford Drive and continue as a shared concurrency into Caldwell County.

In Caldwell County, US 64/NC 18 go through the town of Gamewell before entering Lenoir, from the southwest. In Lenoir, US 64/NC 18 will cross US 321 (Blowing Rock Boulevard/Hickory Boulevard), where traffic could possibly get backed up. US 64/NC 18 will then overlap with NC 90 (Wilkesboro Boulevard) before US 64/NC 90 splits off and continues towards Taylorsville; while NC 18 goes northeasterly, adjacent to the Brushy Mountains, through the Cedar Rock and Kings Creek before entering Wilkes County.

After passing through Thankful and Boomer, it joins NC 16 at Moravian Falls, then goes north towards Wilkesboro. After crossing over US 421 (exit 286A), it ends its concurrency with NC 16, but soon NC 268 along Main Street. Crossing the Yadkin River, NC 18/NC 268 enters North Wilkesboro and travels through its downtown area via Wilkesboro Avenue, CBD Loop, D Street, Sixth Street and finally B Street. With a short concurrency with US 421 Bus., it continues north along Second Street. NC 268 splits at Elkin Highway towards Elkin. After passing through Mulberry, Halls Mill and McGrady, NC 18 takes its ascent along a curvy stretch of highway into Alleghany County.

Entering the county at Mulberry Gap (3,100 feet (940 m)), NC 18 hugs along the Ashe-Alleghany county line before crossing under the Blue Ridge Parkway. At Laurel Springs, NC 18 connects with NC 88, where it goes westerly towards Jefferson. Heading northeasterly, through Whitehead, it crosses US 21 in Sparta. Crossing the Little River, at Blevins Crossroads, NC 18 goes easterly, near the Virginia state line. North of Cumberland Knob, NC 18 crosses under the Blue Ridge Parkway again and enters Surry County. After .64 miles (1.03 km) from the county line, it NC 18 ends at NC 89, near the community of Lowgap and .3 miles (0.48 km) from the Virginia state line. Continuing on NC 89 will take travelers south to Mount Airy or north to Galax, Virginia.

== History ==
NC 18 was established in 1921 as an original state highway, traveling from NC 20, in Shelby, to NC 67, in Moravian Falls; connecting the cities of Morganton and Lenoir.

In 1925, NC 18 was extended south to its current southern terminus at the South Carolina state line, near Earl. South Carolina reciprocate in 1930 with the establishment of SC 111 from the state line to Gaffney, which was later renumbered SC 18 in 1937. In 1929, NC 18 was extended north, replacing NC 67, through Wilkesboro and North Wilkesboro, to US 21/NC 26 in Sparta. Also in 1929, NC 18 was rerouted south of Morganton going through the Sunnyside community and leaving behind Enola and Enola Road (SR 1922). In 1930, NC 18 was extended northeast along new primary routing to its current northern terminus at NC 89, near Lowgap.

In 1948 or 1949, NC 18 was rerouted onto new bypass south of downtown Lenoir; its old alignment along Harper Avenue became NC 18A. In 1952, NC 18 was placed on new routing between Laurel Hill and Morganton with a 3.1-mile (5.0 km) routing through Catawba County; the old routing through Camp Creek and Sunnyside was downgraded to secondary road "Old North Carolina Highway 18" (SR 1100 Gaston County, SR 1555 Cleveland County and SR 1924 Burke County).

In 1962, NC 18 was rerouted in downtown North Wilkesboro, from B Street to a split with northbound along 10th Street and southbound along D Street and Forester Avenue. In 1966, NC 18 was rerouted in downtown Shelby, from South Washington and East Graham Streets to South Lafayette Street. In 1969, NC 18 was rerouted at Moravian Falls onto NC 16, leaving Moravian Falls Road (SR 1194). In 1977, NC 18 was rerouted in downtown Morganton from Avery Avenue to Bouchelle Street. In 1978, NC 18 was rerouted again in downtown North Wilkesboro, from Forester Avenue to CBD loop. In 1992, NC 18 was rerouted back to its former alignment in downtown Morganton, via Avery Avenue.

== Major intersections ==
County	Location	mi	km	Destinations	Notes
Cleveland		0.0	0.0	SC 18 south (Shelby Highway) – Gaffney	South Carolina state line
Cleveland	Patterson Springs	2.2	3.5	NC 180 north (Post Road) – Shelby	Southern terminus of NC 180
Cleveland	Shelby	6.0	9.7	NC 150 west (College Avenue) – Boiling Springs	South end of NC 150 overlap
Cleveland	Shelby	8.0	12.9	US 74 / NC 226 (Dixon Boulevard) – Mooresboro, Polkville, Kings Mountain, Grover	
Cleveland	Shelby	8.9	14.3	US 74 Bus. / NC 150 (Marion Street) – Lincolnton	North end of NC 150 overlap
Cleveland	Shelby			To NC 226 (Shelby Bypass)	
Cleveland	Shelby	13.3	21.4	NC 180 south (Post Road) – Patterson Springs	Northern terminus of NC 180
Cleveland	Fallston	19.4	31.2	NC 182 (Stage Coach Trail) – Polkville, Lincolnton	
Lincoln	Toluca	27.2	43.8	NC 27 (Poe Road) – Lincolnton, Charlotte	
Lincoln	Laurel Hill	28.3	45.5	NC 10 south – Casar	South end of NC 10 overlap
Lincoln	Laurel Hill	28.5	45.9	NC 10 north – Newton	North end of NC 10 overlap
Catawba	No major junctions				
Burke	Morganton	45.8	73.7	I-40 – Hickory, Marion	I-40 exit 105
Burke	Morganton	47.7	76.8	US 70 (Fleming Drive) – Glen Alpine, Valdese	
Burke	Morganton	48.3	77.7	US 64 west (Union Street) / US 70 Bus. west (Meeting Street) / NC 181 (Green Street) – Rutherfordton, Pineola	South end of very short overlap with Business US 70 on one-way pair; South end of US 64 overlap; Southern terminus of NC 181
Burke	Morganton	48.5	78.1	US 70 Bus. east (Union Street)	North end of Business US 70 overlap
Caldwell	Lenoir	61.5	99.0	NC 18 Bus. north (Harper Avenue) – Downtown Lenoir	Diamond interchange
Caldwell	Lenoir	64.3	103.5	NC 18 Bus. south / NC 90 west (Harper Avenue) – Downtown Lenoir, Collettsville	South end of NC 90 overlap
Caldwell	Lenoir	64.4	103.6	US 321 (Hickory Boulevard) – Hickory, Boone	Diamond interchange
Caldwell	Lenoir	65.8	105.9	US 64 east / NC 90 east (Taylorsville Road) – Taylorsville, Statesville	North end of US 64 / NC 90 overlaps
Wilkes	Moravian Falls	88.7	142.7	NC 16 south – Taylorsville	South end of NC 16 overlap
Wilkes	Wilkesboro	91.9	147.9	US 421 / NC 16 north (Watson Brame Expressway) – Yadkinville, Boone, Jefferson	North end of NC 16 overlap
Wilkes	Wilkesboro	92.4	148.7	NC 268 west (Main Street) – Lenoir	South end of NC 268 overlap
Wilkes	North Wilkesboro	94.0	151.3	US 421 Bus. north (6th Street)	South end of Business US 421 overlap
Wilkes	North Wilkesboro	94.9	152.7	US 421 Bus. south / NC 115 south – Statesville, Troutman	North end of Business US 421 overlap; northern terminus of NC 115
Wilkes	North Wilkesboro	95.8	154.2	NC 268 east (Elkin Highway) – Ronda	North end of NC 268 overlap
Alleghany		115.4	185.7	Blue Ridge Parkway	
Alleghany	Laurel Springs	117.4	188.9	NC 88 west – Jefferson	Eastern terminus of NC 88
Alleghany	Laurel Springs	118.3	190.4	NC 113 north – Scottville	Southern terminus of NC 113
Alleghany	Sparta	129.9	209.1	US 21 (Main Street) – Elkin, Independence	
Surry	Lowgap	144.7	232.9	Blue Ridge Parkway	
Surry	Lowgap	145.5	234.2	NC 89 (Pine Street) – Mount Airy, Galax	
1.000 mi = 1.609 km; 1.000 km = 0.621 mi: Concurrency terminus

== Special routes ==
=== Shelby truck route ===
North Carolina Highway 18 Truck
- Location: Shelby
- Length: 3.9 mi (6.3 km)

North Carolina Highway 18 Truck (NC 18 Truck) provides an alternative route for truck drivers that are passing through Shelby. Its routing, entirely on Dekalb Street, is both four-lane and provides a bypass from the downtown/county courthouse area. Signage along the route only appears at key intersections.

=== Morganton truck route ===
North Carolina Highway 18 Truck
- Location: Morganton
- Length: 5.0 mi (8.0 km)

North Carolina Highway 18 Truck (NC 18 Truck) is a 5.0-mile (8.0 km) bypass west and north around downtown Morganton. It starts by going west along Fleming Drive (overlapping US 70) and then north along Sanford Drive (overlapping US 64), reconnecting with mainline NC 18 at Lenoir Road. Signage along the route only appears at key intersections.

=== Lenoir alternate route ===
North Carolina Highway 18A
- Location: Lenoir
- Length: 2.9 mi (4.7 km)
- Existed: 1949–1960

North Carolina Highway 18 Alternate (NC 18A) was established around 1948-1949 as a renumbering of mainline NC 18, which was placed on a new bypass alignment south of downtown Lenoir. The route traversed along Harper Avenue entirely. In 1960, it was redesignated as NC 18 Bus.

=== Lenoir business loop ===
North Carolina Highway 18 Business
- Location: Lenoir
- Length: 2.9 mi (4.7 km)
- Existed: 1960–2012

North Carolina Highway 18 Business (NC 18 Bus) was established 1960 as a rebannering of mainline NC 18A, which traversed along Harper Avenue in downtown Lenoir. In 1968, westbound was rerouted along Mulberry and West Avenue; Sometime between 1969-1982, westbound was adjusted along Ridge Street onto West Avenue, eliminating Mulberry Avenue from the route. In 2006, a major realignment in downtown Lenoir took place, eliminating US 321A; at that time signage for NC 18 Bus was removed, but the route was not decommissioned. In December, 2012, NCDOT approved a change package that decommissioned the business loop and transferred control of the roads to the city of Lenoir.

== See also ==
- North Carolina Bicycle Route 6 – concurrent with NC 18 in Laurel Hill and Morganton
