= North Carolina Highway 61 =

State highway in North Carolina, United States

North Carolina Highway 61

Route information
- Maintained by NCDOT
- Length: 19.8 mi (31.9 km)
- Existed: 1930–present

Major junctions
- South end: NC 62 near Alamance
- I-40 / I-85 in Whitsett; US 70 in Whitsett
- North end: NC 150 in Osceola

Location
- Country: United States
- State: North Carolina
- Counties: Guilford

Highway system
- North Carolina Highway System; Interstate; US; State; Scenic
← NC 60	→ NC 62

North Carolina Highway 61 (NC 61) is a primary state highway in the U.S. state of North Carolina. It serves as the main north–south highway in eastern Guilford County, connecting Whitsett and Gibsonville.

== Route description ==
NC 61 is a two-lane rural highway from NC 62, located between Julian and Alamance, to NC 150, in Osceola. Serving primary as a farm-to-market, it connects the farms in eastern Guilford County with Whitsett and Gibsonville.

== History ==
Established in 1930 as a new primary routing, it traversed from NC 109, in Thomasville, to NC 60, in Julian. In 1936, NC 61 was extended northeast to US 70, near Whitsett. In 1940, NC 61 was truncated at its current southern terminus, its former routing south to Thomasville replaced by NC 62. In 1961, NC 61 was extended on new primary routing north and onto NC 100 to Gibsonville; there, it continued north to its current northern terminus at NC 150, in Osceola.

== Major intersections ==
The entire route is in Guilford County.

Location	mi	km	Destinations	Notes
	0.0	0.0	NC 62 – Burlington, Julian, High Point	Western terminus
Whitsett	6.3	10.1	I-40 / I-85 – Burlington, Greensboro	
Whitsett	7.4	11.9	US 70 (Burlington Road) – Burlington, Greensboro	
Whitsett	8.2	13.2	NC 100 west	West end of NC 100 overlap
Gibsonville	10.0	16.1	NC 100 east (Main Street) – Elon	East end of NC 100 overlap
Osceola	19.8	31.9	NC 150 (Burlington Road) – Brown Summit	Eastern terminus
1.000 mi = 1.609 km; 1.000 km = 0.621 mi: Concurrency terminus
