= North Carolina Highway 10 =

State highway in North Carolina, US

North Carolina Highway 10

Route information
- Maintained by NCDOT
- Length: 48.3 mi (77.7 km)
- Existed: 1921–present

Major junctions
- West end: NC 226 in Polkville
- US 321 near Newton; US 70 near Catawba
- East end: I-40 near Catawba

Location
- Country: United States
- State: North Carolina
- Counties: Cleveland, Lincoln, Catawba

Highway system
- North Carolina Highway System; Interstate; US; State; Scenic
← NC 9	→ NC 11

North Carolina Highway 10 (NC 10) is a primary state highway in the U.S. state of North Carolina. Originally established as the state's central highway, from Murphy to Beaufort, it now serves to connect the city of Newton with the nearby communities and towns in the foothills region.

== Route description ==
=== Cleveland County ===
The current western terminus for NC 10 is in Polkville. The road forks from NC 226 and heads north out of town, curving through the North Carolina foothills as Casar Road. NC 10 passes through the town of Casar. The road makes a curve to the east at Leman Gap Road, continuing for several more miles until meeting with the northern terminus of NC 27. It crosses into Lincoln county soon after that.

=== Lincoln County ===
After NC 10 enters Lincoln County, it meets NC 18, which is concurrent with NC 10 for about one mile until the community of Laurel Hill. NC 18 then heads northwest as NC 10 continues east-northeast. The route crosses into Catawba County.

=== Catawba County ===
NC 10 winds its way through Propst Crossroads and Blackburn, and then crosses under US 321. It continues through Startown, entering Newton from the east and crossing US 321 Business. The road becomes C Street, takes a sharp curve and passes through downtown Newton as D Street. On the east side of Newton, NC 10 curves left then heads off east, crossing NC 16. At Catawba, the road makes a sharp left north. Once it crosses US 70, NC 10 reaches its eastern terminus at Interstate 40 (exit 138) in Catawba County, just southwest of Statesville.

== History ==
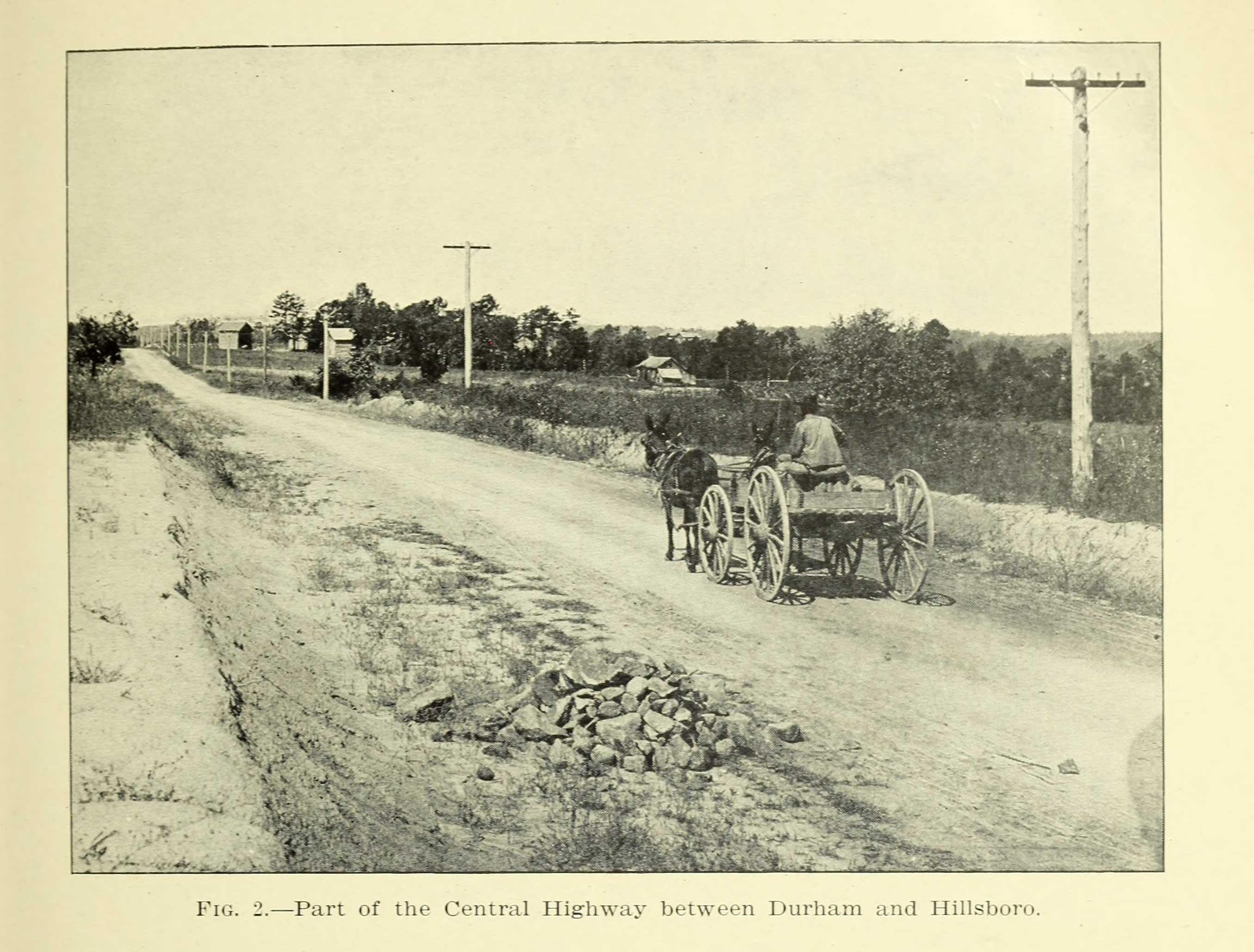
Fig. 2 Part of the Central Highway between Durham and Hillsboro.jpg, from "Highway work in North Carolina : containing a statistical report of road work during 1911" (1912), Economic Paper No. 27 of the North Carolina Geological and Economic Survey, by Joseph Hyde Pratt, State Geologist

NC 10 was initially part of the great Central Highway and designated as an original numbered state route in 1921. Cecil K. Brown described the origin of the Central Highway in his study of North Carolina's state highway system:

One of the most important steps taken in [statewide road planning] was the creation by the legislature in 1911 of the Central Highway. This was by no means a highway in any practical sense of the word, but was only a projected route for travel through the state. The route was to begin at Morehead City and go through the state from east to west by way of Raleigh, Greensboro, Salisbury and Asheville. All the way it followed closely the line of railroad built by the state in the middle third of the last century. That route, long ago broken up into several routes with various directions, was built on a most circuitous survey. But the Central Highway followed its sweeping curves and even today [1931] the magnificent state route number 10 takes the same roundabout course from the seashore to the Tennessee line. In 1911 a Central Highway Committee was appointed with the function of designating the route in detail, and getting the various counties to cooperate in building it through from one end of the state to the other. The idea was to show people what a highway trip through the state would mean. Every year the committee made a trip over the route, traveling by automobile, exhorting the people to good works and telling them what the other counties were doing.

The North Carolina State Highway Commission, established in 1915, surveyed a route for NC 10, which was the number designated for the Central Highway. Existing roads were linked with new roads to form the east–west route. In 1921, Governor Cameron Morrison, along with the state legislature, backed a $50 million bond for a state-owned and maintained highway system, launching North Carolina's first organized statewide road and bridge improvement campaign. This came to fruition in 1921 with the creation of the state highway system. In November, 1926, the U.S. highway system of highways was adopted for "uniform marking" by the American Association of State Highway Officials.; NC 10 was overlaid by US 70 and US 19, and in 1934, North Carolina eliminated most state highways that coincided with U.S. highways. After 1934, NC 10 was severely truncated. and, for the most part, disappeared from the map.

NC 10 was also known as the "Old Hickory Highway;" at the North Carolina State Capitol building there is a granite highway marker commemorating the North Carolina soldiers of the U.S. Army's 30th "Old Hickory" Division, who fought to break the Hindenburg Line in France during World War I. The marker was placed in 1930 where NC 10 passed by the state capitol. A second marker is located at the corner of Blue Ridge Road and Hillsborough Street in Raleigh.

=== Original route description ===
NC 10 started at the border near Belview. At Belview, the road turned onto Martin's Creek Road to Murphy, crossing the Hiwassee River, then going through Tomotla, Marble (along Old State Road), Andrews (passing though Andrews on Main and Second Street), and Wesser. NC 10 then followed NC 28 west to Almond; there it went north and east, but this part of the road is now underwater. The road picks up west of Bryson City on Lower Alarka Road. After Bryson City, the road went to Ela, followed Hwy 19A along the Tuckasegee River, and then essentially followed current US 74 to Asheville from there.

In West Asheville, NC 10 went up US Alt 74 to Haywood Avenue, crossed the French Broad River, then down Depot Street before using Jefferson Street to Patton Avenue to downtown Asheville. NC 10 turned south onto Broadway then to Biltmore Avenue to leave downtown Asheville, then east on Swannanoa Avenue out to the Oteen area. After Asheville, NC 10 went east to Black Mountain, and then wound its way through the mountains to Old Fort. Most of this section is now the Point Lookout Trail. NC 10 continued through Nebo (along Memorial Park Road and Old Hwy 10E), Marion, Morganton, and then into Hickory (along US 70A). Once leaving Hickory, NC 10 then passed through Conover, Catawba, Statesville, Salisbury, across the Yadkin River on the Wil-Cox Bridge (It is still in use with US 29), Lexington, through Thomasville and High Point. From High Point, NC 10 followed Montlieu Street to Greensboro Road to Main Street through Jamestown, left onto Gate City Boulevard (curving onto High Point Road and back) into Greensboro.

NC 10 ran from Greensboro to Elon College, Burlington, Graham, and entered Hillsborough on a parallel route east just north of the current interstate on Ben Johnson Road. The road followed the Eno River to Hillsborough and turned left on King Street (which no longer is an intersection). The route turned right onto Churton St. (NC 86) and went south from Hillsborough across the interstate and turned east on Old NC 10. The route then curved to the right a short distance past NC 751 onto the now Bennett Memorial Road, down to directly in front of the Bennett Place (now a Civil War Historical site), followed along Neal road, then over to Comfort Lane (The Durham Freeway is now built over this section of the road), under the railroad pass and reconnected to US 70 immediately before Cole Mill Road in Durham. The road entered Durham on Hillsborough Road, then turned right onto 9th Street, left onto Main Street through to Alston Avenue and Angier Avenue. It followed Angier Ave. to Miami Road at Bethesda, where it headed south until NC 54 at Nelson. It then mostly followed NC 54 to Maynard Road in Cary; there it bounced to Chapel Hill Road, Durham Road, finally Hillsborough Street into Raleigh.

NC 10 left Raleigh and then passed through Smithfield, Princeton, Goldsboro, La Grange, Kinston, New Bern, Havelock, and terminated in Beaufort.

=== Existing remnants ===
Most of NC 10 has been subsumed into US 19 and US 70; parts, however, of the early road still exist. They are generally signed with some form of "Old Hwy 10". This list only takes into account road segments that are still titled in some way "NC 10."

Between Murphy and Andrews there is a mile long segment running immediately south along US 19. The western end dead-ends, but the eastern side connects with US 19 directly across from Airport Road. It is called "Old State Road."

A short segment still comes from US 19 south of Almond, but only at either end for a short distance. The road still exists in between these two short parts, but is inaccessible. The two segments are called "Old Rte 10." The western section is marked "Glen Cove", and the western end is a short side entrance. Neither is marked as Old Rte 10 from the road.

There are two short remnants of NC 10 along US 74 in Swain County, in Bryson City near the Wesser community. The roads are named "Old 10" and "Old Route 10" respectively. Each segment is about 650 feet (200 m) in length.

There is a two-block section of NC 10 in Buncombe County, in Black Mountain. The segment runs north of and parallel to E. State Street (between Black Mountain and Ridgecrest) and I-40. In a residential neighborhood, the street is named "Old State Ten Road."

A short distance after Marion, there is a segment which exits left from US 70 (now Memorial Park Road), curves and winds to the northeast, then southeast to Nebo, where it reconnects to US 70. It is marked (inconsistently) "Old Hwy 10 E." It is now State Road 1536.

There is a segment of Old NC Hwy 10 right to the west of Hickory, starting in Icard and angling off southeast from US 70, passing under I-40(Exit 116), continuing to Shoupes Grove Church Road, turning east and crossing I-40 again at exit 118. Old NC 10 enters Hildebran, intersects with Center Street, then becomes Main Street, running along US 70 for a brief distance until meeting up again.

Just east of Mebane, old NC 10 (now W 10 Road) runs for several miles parallel to current I-40/85, just a mile south of the highway. At Efland, the road now ends at the US 70 Connector, but initially it ran a bit farther east, turned a sharp curve to the north, crossed the interstate immediately past the connector. It then went to the current Ben Johnson Road.

South of Hillsborough, immediately over the I-85 interchange, there is a lengthy section of the old NC 10 running from NC 86 to NC 751.

== Major intersections ==
County	Location	mi	km	Destinations	Notes
Cleveland	Polkville	0.0	0.0	NC 226 (Polkville Road) – Shelby, Marion	Southern terminus
Cleveland	Toluca	14.8	23.8	NC 27 east (Poe Road) – Lincolnton	Western terminus of NC 27
Lincoln	Laurel Hill	15.7	25.3	NC 18 south – Shelby	South end of NC 18 overlap
Lincoln	Laurel Hill	16.0	25.7	NC 18 north – Morganton	North end of NC 18 overlap
Catawba	Propst Crossroads	25.9	41.7	NC 127 north – Hickory	Southern terminus of NC 127
Catawba	Newton	31.0	49.9	US 321 (Senator David W. Hoyle Highway) – Lincolnton, Hickory	Diamond interchange
Catawba	Newton	35.5	57.1	US 321 Bus. (SouthWest Boulevard)	
Catawba	Newton	36.0	57.9	NC 16 Bus. north (Main Avenue/College Avenue)	South end of NC 16 Bus. overlap; Pair of one-way streets, Main Avenue (SB), College Avenue (NB)
Catawba	Newton	36.9	59.4	NC 16 Bus. south (D Street)	North end of NC 16 Bus. overlap
Catawba	Newton	37.9	61.0	NC 16 – Lowesville, Conover	
Catawba	Catawba	46.7	75.2	US 70 (American Ex-Prisoners of War Highway) – Conover, Statesville	
Catawba	Catawba	48.4	77.9	I-40 – Hickory, Statesville	Northern terminus; I-40 Exit 138; Diamond interchange
1.000 mi = 1.609 km; 1.000 km = 0.621 mi: Concurrency terminus

== Special routes ==
=== Conover–Catawba alternate route ===
North Carolina Highway 10A
- Location: Conover–Catawba
- Existed: 1930–1934

North Carolina Highway 10 Alternate (NC 10A) was a renumbering of NC 110, which bypassed Newton by traveling north through Claremont; it was in complete concurrency with US 70. In 1934, it was decommissioned in favor of US 70.

=== High Point alternate route ===
North Carolina Highway 10A
- Location: High Point
- Existed: 1933–1934

North Carolina Highway 10 Alternate (NC 10A) was established as a new alternate routing that bypassed north of downtown High Point, via Westchester Drive and Lexington Avenue; it was in complete concurrency with US 70. In 1934, it was decommissioned in favor of US 70.

=== Gibsonville–Burlington alternate route ===
North Carolina Highway 10A
- Location: Gibsonville–Burlington
- Existed: 1932–1934

North Carolina Highway 10 Alternate (NC 10A) was a renumbering of NC 100, which traveled through Elon College. In 1934, it was reverted to NC 100.

== See also ==
- North Carolina Bicycle Route 6
