= NC92 =

NC92 may refer to one of the following topics:

- Duke University North Heliport (ICAO code and FAA LID)
- North Carolina Highway 92
