= North Carolina Highway 306 =

State highway in North Carolina, US

North Carolina Highway 306

- Route of NC 306 in solid red; NC 306 ferries in dashed red

Route information
- Maintained by NCDOT
- Length: 45.1 mi (72.6 km)
- Existed: 1930–present

Major junctions
- South end: NC 101 near Havelock
- NC 55 near Grantsboro
- North end: NC 92 / NC 99 in Gaylord

Location
- Country: United States
- State: North Carolina
- Counties: Craven, Pamlico, Beaufort

Highway system
- North Carolina Highway System; Interstate; US; State; Scenic
← NC 305	→ NC 307

North Carolina Highway 306 (NC 306) is a primary state highway in the U.S. state of North Carolina. The highway provides a link between Havelock, Minnesott Beach, and Grantsboro. The route is primarily rural, and uses two free ferries to cross the Neuse and Pamlico Rivers before reaching NC 92/NC 99 near Gaylord.

NC 306 was established in 1932 as a new primary route running from Minnesott Beach to NC 302 in Grantsboro. The highway was extended north to NC 33 near Aurora in 1936. The highway remained unchanged until 1976, when the northern and southern termini of the highway were extended to their current locations.

== Route description ==
The highway's southern terminus is in Craven County, near Havelock. It follows Ferry Road north from its intersection with NC 101 for about five miles (8.0 km) before it encounters the Neuse River. On the banks of the river is the dock for a free ferry, which the highway utilizes to cross the river. Many locals use this ferry to commute to and from the Marine Corps Air Station Cherry Point in Havelock, which makes this particular crossing among the busiest in the state.

Once across the river, which serves as the county line for Pamlico County, the highway goes through the village of Minnesott Beach. The route goes due north through Pamlico County on the east bank of the river. In Grantsboro, it crosses NC 55 about halfway through the county before crossing into Beaufort County. Many from southern Craven and Carteret counties use this route to get to the popular destination of Oriental.

Once in Beaufort County, a brief concurrency with NC 33 begins about six miles (9.7 km) into the county. NC 306 then turns left from the NC 33, skirting Aurora and bisecting the large PCS Phosphate facilities. After going through PCS Phosphate, the road crosses the Pamlico River, again by a free ferry used by many commuters to get to the phosphate plant. On the other side of the river, the route immediately and abruptly comes to its northern terminus at NC 92 and NC 99, still in Beaufort County.

== History ==
NC 306 was established in 1930 as a new primary routing from Minnesott Beach to NC 302 (present-day NC 55) in Grantsboro. In 1932, NC 306 was extended north on new primary routing to NC 33 near Aurora.

In 1976, NC 306 was extended on both directions. The northern extension overlaps with NC 33 to Aurora, where it then goes north on new primary routing to the Pamlico River Ferry where it crosses the Pamlico River to Gaylord, ending at NC 92. The southern extension begins at Minnesott Beach, where it goes on the Neuse River Ferry, crossing the Neuse River to Cherry Point, then continuing south on new primary routing to NC 101. In 2001, the routing between Aurora and the Pamlico River Ferry was adjusted related to expansion at the nearby PCS Phosphate site.

== Future ==
NCDOT has identified the need to replace the current ferry service across the Pamlico River with a 4.36-mile (7.02 km) two-lane bridge. The justification is to accommodate current existing and future commuter and commercial traffic growth related to the PCS Phosphate site. At an estimated cost of $101 million, it is currently unfunded.

== Junction list ==
County	Location	mi	km	Destinations	Notes
Craven		0.0	0.0	NC 101 – Havelock, Beaufort	
Craven	Neuse River	4.5	7.2	Cherry Branch-Minnesott Beach Ferry	
Pamlico	Grantsboro	19.0	30.6	NC 55 – Bayboro, New Bern	
Beaufort		30.1	48.4	NC 33 west – Chocowinity	West end of NC 33 overlap
Beaufort	Aurora	33.3	53.6	NC 33 east – Bayboro	East end of NC 33 overlap
Beaufort	Pamlico River	41.5	66.8	Bayview-Aurora Ferry	
Beaufort	Gaylord	45.1	72.6	NC 92 west / NC 99 north – Bath, Belhaven	Eastern terminus of NC 92, southern terminus of NC 99
1.000 mi = 1.609 km; 1.000 km = 0.621 mi: Concurrency terminus

== See also ==
- North Carolina Bicycle Route 3-Concurrent with NC 306 from Tunstall Swamp Road (near the southern intersection with NC 33) to the Bayview-Aurora Ferry
- North Carolina Bicycle Route 7-Concurrent with NC 306 from its southern terminus to Neuse Road in Arapahoe
