= Festival Park =

Festival Park may refer to:

- Festival Park in the English city of Stoke-on-Trent, former site of a National Garden Festival.
- Festival Park, Ebbw Vale, in Wales, an outdoor shopping centre on the former site of a National Garden Festival.
- The Henry Maier Festival Park in the U.S. city of Milwaukee, along the shores of Lake Michigan.
- Roanoke Island Festival Park
- Jamestown Festival Park
- Festival Park, Lake George, in Hobart, Indiana.
- Festival Park, Zephyrhills
- Festival Park Iowa, a themed event park in Des Moines, Iowa.
