= Laurel Hill, North Carolina =

Laurel Hill, North Carolina can refer to:

- Laurel Hill, Scotland County, North Carolina, an unincorporated community
- Laurel Hill Township, North Carolina, a township in Scotland County
- Laurel Hill, Lincoln County, North Carolina, an unincorporated community
