= North Carolina Highway 62 =

State highway in North Carolina, US

North Carolina Highway 62

- Route of NC 62 highlighted in red

Route information
- Maintained by NCDOT
- Length: 84.4 mi (135.8 km)
- Existed: early 1920s–present

Major junctions
- South end: NC 109 in Thomasville
- I-85 in Archdale; I-73 / US 220 in Pleasant Garden; US 421 in Julian; I-40 / I-85 in Burlington; US 70 in Burlington; US 158 in Yanceyville
- North end: SR 62 at the Virginia state line in Milton

Location
- Country: United States
- State: North Carolina
- Counties: Davidson, Randolph, Guilford, Alamance, Caswell

Highway system
- North Carolina Highway System; Interstate; US; State; Scenic
← NC 61	→ NC 63

North Carolina Highway 62 (NC 62) is a primary state highway in the U.S. state of North Carolina. Primarily in the Piedmont Triad, it runs from NC 109 in Thomasville northeast to the Virginia state line in Milton.

== Route description ==
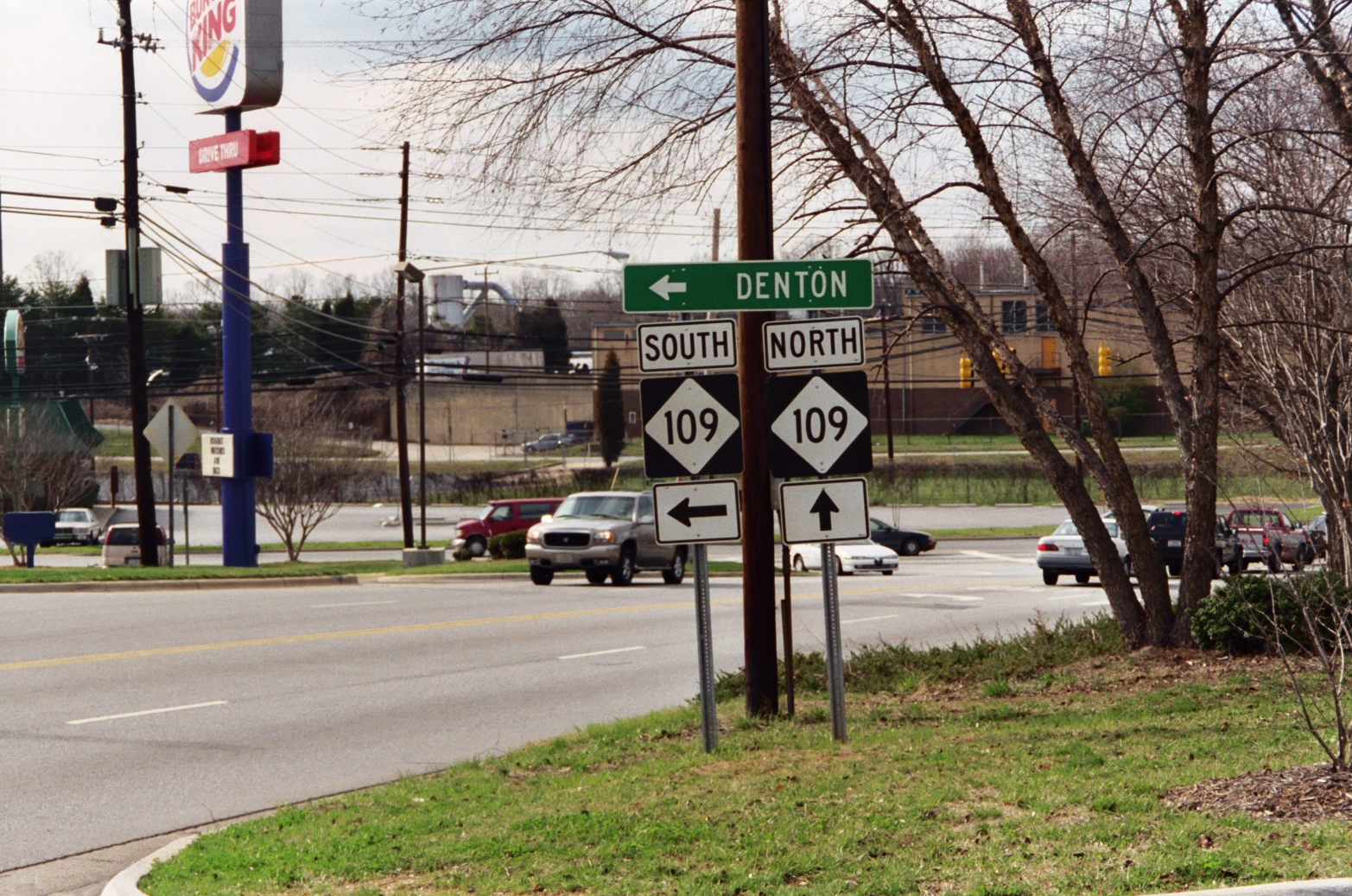
NC 62's southern terminus

NC 62 begins in Thomasville at the intersection of Randolph Street (NC 109) and Julian Avenue; it is 0.4 miles (0.64 km) from I-85 and shadows the Interstate from Thomasville to Archdale. East of Archdale, it overlaps with NC Bike Route 2 through the communities of Climax and Julian. Before the town of Alamance, the highway goes right through the middle of the Alamance Battleground (the area will be marked with several colored flags and monuments). After crossing I-40/I-85, NC 62 does a zig-zag through downtown Burlington. Continuing north of town, it goes through the communities and towns of Pleasant Grove, Jericho, and Yanceyville, before reaching the town of Milton. After crossing the Dan River, it enters the Commonwealth of Virginia; where it continues for 4 miles (6.4 km) before ending on US 58/US 360, east of Danville, Virginia.

== History ==
NC 62 was an original state highway; starting from Asheboro (then NC 70, currently US 221 Business), going northeast through Liberty and Graham, and ending in Yanceyville (then NC 14, currently Main Street). In 1928, the route was extended from Asheboro to New London, and again in 1930 from Yanceyville to Milton. In 1933, the route was moved north of New London and extended to Mount Pleasant.

In 1940, NC 62 was realigned to a new routing south of Pleasant Grove to its now current routing through Burlington and Archdale, ending in Thomasville at NC 109. The former route to Mount Pleasant is now part of NC 49.

In 1947, NC 62 was extended into Virginia, which also created VA 62. The last change to the route was between 1954–57, between the community of Fitch to Yanceyville, moving to a new road east; leaving behind Oak View Loop Road and Badgett Sisters Parkway.

== Major intersections ==
County	Location	mi	km	Destinations	Notes
Davidson	Thomasville	0.0	0.0	NC 109 (Randolph Street) / Julian Avenue – Denton	
Randolph	No major junctions				
Guilford	Archdale	8.7	14.0	NC 610 west (Fairfield Road)	Eastern terminus of NC 610
Guilford	Archdale	9.2– 9.4	14.8– 15.1	I-85 to I-74 – Greensboro, Charlotte	Exit 113 (I-85)
Guilford	Pleasant Garden	15.7– 15.9	25.3– 25.6	I-73 / US 220 – Greensboro, Asheboro	Exit 89 (I-73)
Guilford	Climax	22.4	36.0	NC 22 south – Franklinville	Northern terminus of NC 22
Guilford	Julian	24.2– 24.4	38.9– 39.3	US 421 – Greensboro, Siler City	Interchange
Guilford		33.4	53.8	NC 61 north – Whitsett	Southern terminus of NC 61
Alamance	Burlington	41.4– 41.5	66.6– 66.8	I-40 / I-85 – Greensboro, Durham, Raleigh	Exit 143 (I-40/I-85)
Alamance	Burlington	42.7	68.7	US 70 west (South Church Street)	Southern end of US 70 concurrency
Alamance	Burlington	42.8	68.9	NC 54 east (Chapel Hill Road)	Western terminus of NC 54; access to and from US 70 eastbound / NC 62 northbound
Alamance	Burlington	44.4	71.5	NC 87 / NC 100 (Webb Avenue)	
Alamance	Burlington	44.8– 44.9	72.1– 72.3	US 70 east (North Church Street / North Fisher Street) / Holt Avenue	Northern end of US 70 concurrency (US 70 is a one-way pair)
Alamance	Pleasant Grove	54.8	88.2	NC 49 – Haw River, Roxboro	
Caswell	Yanceyville	72.0	115.9	US 158 west / NC 86 north – Danville	Southern end of US 158 / NC 86 concurrency
Caswell	Yanceyville	72.2	116.2	US 158 east / NC 86 south – Hillsborough	Northern end of US 158 / NC 86 concurrency
Caswell	Milton	84.0	135.2	NC 57 south (Broad Street) – Roxboro	Northern terminus of NC 57
Caswell		84.4	135.8	SR 62 north – Danville	Virginia state line
1.000 mi = 1.609 km; 1.000 km = 0.621 mi: Concurrency terminus; Incomplete access

== Special routes ==
Historically there was one 3-mile-long (4.8 km) alternate route in New London, from 1935-1940; it was labeled as NC 62A. It was soon renumbered as NC 49A when NC 49 replaced NC 62 in the area. Later, in 1947, it would renumber again to NC 6, then finally in 1953 as an extension and terminus of NC 8.

== See also ==
- North Carolina Bicycle Route 2 - Concurrent with NC 62 from SR 1129 near Jamestown to Kimesville
- North Carolina Bicycle Route 4 - Concurrent with NC 62 from Yanceyville to Hamer
