= North Carolina Highway 100 =

State highway in North Carolina, US

North Carolina Highway 100

Route information
- Maintained by NCDOT
- Length: 12.1 mi (19.5 km)
- Existed: 1934–present

Major junctions
- West end: US 70 in Whisett
- East end: NC 49 / NC 54 in Burlington

Location
- Country: United States
- State: North Carolina
- Counties: Guilford, Alamance

Highway system
- North Carolina Highway System; Interstate; US; State; Scenic
← NC 99	→ NC 101

North Carolina Highway 100 (NC 100) is a primary state highway in the U.S. state of North Carolina. The route travels between Whitsett and Burlington, connecting the cities of Gibsonville and Elon.

== Route description ==
NC 100 is an urban highway that begins at U.S. Route 70 (US 70) in Whitsett. Going northeast, it overlaps with NC 61 until Gibsonville, then goes east into Elon. Connecting with University Drive, it goes north then east bypassing downtown Elon and Elon University. Near Glen Raven, NC 100 overlaps with NC 87 and goes through downtown Burlington, then splits from NC 87 at Anthony Street. At the turn south onto Maple Avenue, NC 100 goes through a mostly residential area for 1.1 miles (1.8 km), before ending at the intersection with NC 54/NC 49 (Chapel Hill Road/Harden Street).

At Burlington city limit, the North Carolina Railroad/Norfolk Southern tracks cross over the highway along a polygonal Warren truss, built in 1935.

== History ==
The first NC 100 was established in 1929 as a new primary routing from US 70/NC 10 in Whitsett to US 70/NC 10/NC 62, in Haw River. In 1930, the second NC 100 was established when US 70/NC 10 switched routes, from Whitsett to Burlington. In 1932, NC 100 was decommissioned in favor of NC 10A.

The third and current NC 100 was established in late 1934 as a renumbering of NC 10A, traveling from US 70 (Burlington Road) in Whitsett to NC 62/NC 93 in Burlington. Between 1958-1962, NC 87/NC 100 was rerouted in downtown Burlington, from Trollinger, Davis and Maple Streets to Parks and Webb Streets; the old alignment was taken over by the city. In 1981, NC 89/NC 100 was realigned in downtown Burlington, between Fisher-Hoke Street and Lexington Street. In 2007, NC 100 was rerouted in Elon, from along Haggard Avenue onto new bypass routing along University Drive north from the downtown and Elon University. The old alignment was downgraded to a secondary road (SR 1454). In 2014, an elimination of an at-grade intersection at Burlington Avenue and University Drive was made; NC 100 was rerouted on a new connector road from Burlington Avenue/Haggard Avenue to University Drive.

== Major intersections ==
County	Location	mi	km	Destinations	Notes
Guilford	Whitsett	0.0	0.0	US 70 (Burlington Road)	
Guilford	Whitsett	0.9	1.4	NC 61 south	West end of NC 61 overlap
Guilford	Gibsonville	2.7	4.3	NC 61 north (Wharton Avenue) – Osceola	East end of NC 61 overlap
Alamance	Elon	7.0	11.3	NC 87 north / Haggard Avenue – Reidsville	West end of NC 87 overlap
Alamance	Burlington	9.5	15.3	US 70 west / NC 62 south (Fisher Street)	One-way pair streets
Alamance	Burlington	9.7	15.6	US 70 east / NC 62 north (Church Street)	One-way pair
Alamance	Burlington	10.8	17.4	NC 87 south (Webb Avenue) / North Anthony Street	East end of NC 87 overlap
Alamance	Burlington	12.1	19.5	NC 49 (Maple Avenue) / NC 54 (Chapel Hill Road / Harden Street) to I-40 / I-85 – Liberty, Graham	
1.000 mi = 1.609 km; 1.000 km = 0.621 mi: Concurrency terminus
