= McGrady, North Carolina =

- Unincorporated community
- Location within North Carolina Location within the United States
- Coordinates: 36°20′36″N 81°13′29″W
- Country: United States
- State: North Carolina
- County: Wilkes
- Elevation: 1,732 ft (528 m)

Population (2015)
  - Total: 993
- Time zone: UTC-5 (Eastern (EST))
  - Summer (DST): UTC-4 (EDT)
- ZIP code: 28649
- Area code: 336
- GNIS feature ID: 1023357

McGrady is an unincorporated community in Wilkes County, North Carolina, United States. As of 2015, the population was 993. McGrady is located along North Carolina Highway 18, 14 miles (23 km) north-northwest of Wilkesboro. McGrady has a post office with ZIP code 28649. McGrady is located at the base of the Blue Ridge Mountains; the Blue Ridge dominate the community's northern horizon. McGrady consists of numerous valleys with creeks and streams, lower mountain ridges, farms, and forests. The largest stream in the community is Mulberry Creek, which flows south to the Yadkin River, Wilkes County's largest river.
