= Laurel Hill, Lincoln County, North Carolina =

Unincorporated community in North Carolina, US

Coordinates: 35°33′16″N 081°30′10″W

Laurel Hill is an unincorporated community in northwestern Lincoln County, North Carolina, United States. It is located north of Toluca at the intersection of North Carolina Highways 10, and 18.
