= MC Coble =

American performance artist

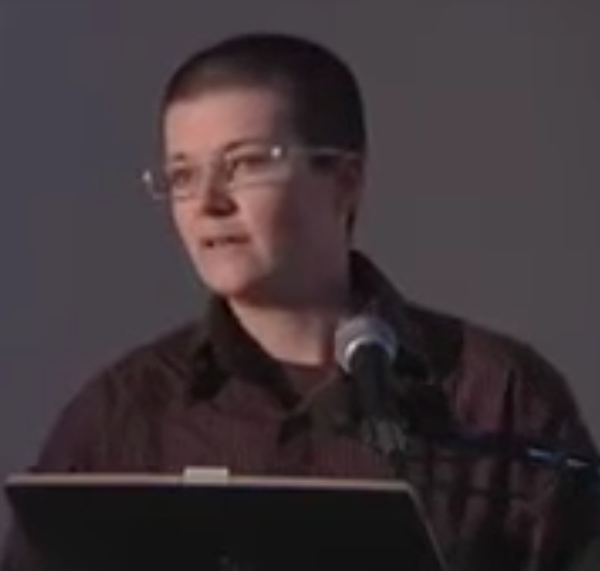
- At the Brooklyn Museum in 2007
- Born: 1978 (age 47–48); North Carolina, United States
- Education: The University of North Carolina at Greensboro (University of North Carolina at Greensboro)
- Known for: Performance art, Queer art
- Notable work: Note to Self (2005); Blood Script (2008); Deferral (2013)
- Website: mccoble.com

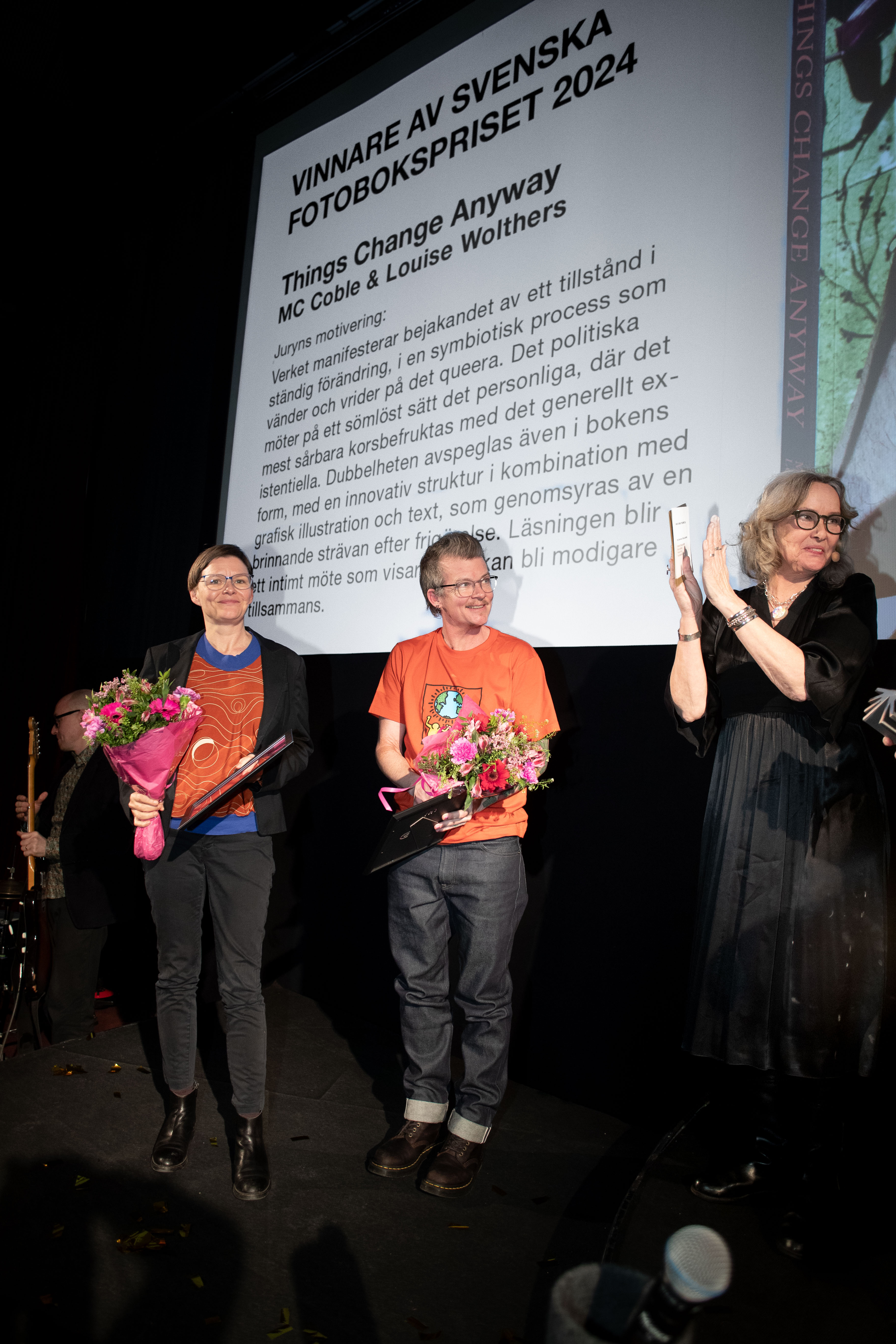

MC Coble (born 1978) is an American artist based in Gothenburg, Sweden. Coble was born in 1978 and is from Julian, North Carolina. Coble received their (Note: Coble uses they/them pronouns. This article uses they/them pronouns for consistency.) Bachelor of Fine Arts from the University of North Carolina at Greensboro in 2001. They then went on to receive their Master of Fine Arts from The George Washington University in Washington, D.C., in 2004. They originally began their art career as a photographer but later turned their attention to performance art. Their most notable works are Note to Self (2005) and Blood Script (2008).

== Installations and performances ==
Note to Self was a performance piece by MC Coble which was performed September 2, 2005 at the Connor Contemporary Art Gallery in Washington D.C. The performance consisted of MC Coble sitting on a chair with their back turned to the audience while being tattooed with the names of victims of LGBTQ related hate crimes. For the solo performance, Coble collected 436 names of gay, lesbian, bi, and transgender individuals that died due to hate crimes. These tattoos were done without ink so each name was visible in blood. After each tattoo, the blood was imprinted on a sheet of paper. The entire performance lasted 12 hours. That same year, during Performa's inaugural biennial in 2005, Coble performed Binding Routine, Daily Ritual at Artists Space in New York. For an hour, they wrapped and unwrapped their breasts with a thick strip of duct tape, as a pile of tangled tape accumulated at their feet and their skin grew raw.

Deferral, performed and installed at the Corcoran Gallery of Art in Washington DC in 2013, addressed FDA regulations banning men who have had sex with other men from donating blood since 1977. Coble collected slogans for blood donation campaigns and printed them on separation screens. Coble had blood drawn on site and then used it to paint the word deferral in Morse code on the screens. When asked in an interview with The Huffington Post about why they chose to do a performance on this topic, Coble responded that it is "...an interest in queer issues of social injustice threads throughout my work. The White House is across from The Corcoran as is the Red Cross-- and so everything just came together." Coble says of their performances,"It is not about hurting myself. It's the only way I can think to express these ideas that my audience will have a strong enough connection to."

Blood Script was a performance piece by MC Coble which was performed in 2008 at the PULSE art fair in New York City. MC Coble had 75 hateful words tattooed onto their body without ink. These 75 words were taken from over 200 words used previously in other performances. These performances were titled MARKER and were performed in New York in 2006, in Washington D.C. in 2007, and Madrid in 2008. The words were tattooed in a decorative font and appeared on their body in blood. After being tattooed, each insult was captured by placing a sheet of paper over the blood, creating an imprint which was then displayed on the gallery wall.
