= Climax, North Carolina =

- Unincorporated community
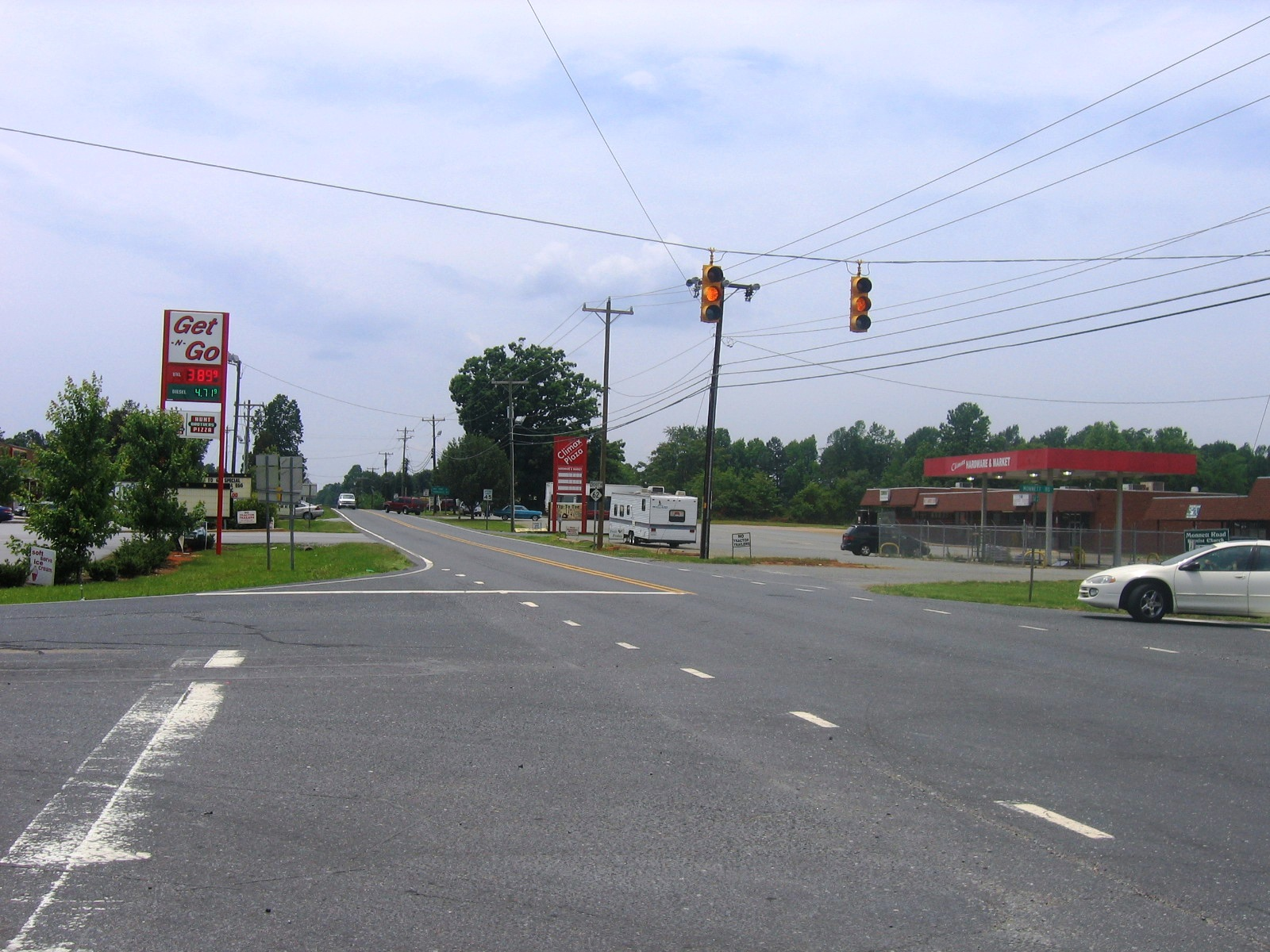
- A view from the center of Climax, looking west on NC Highway 62

- Location within North Carolina Location within the United States
- Coordinates: 35°54′46″N 79°43′03″W
- Country: United States
- State: North Carolina
- County: Guilford, Randolph
- Founded: 1853
- Named for: Located on high ground
- Elevation: 801 ft (244 m)
- Time zone: UTC-5 (Eastern (EST))
  - Summer (DST): UTC-4 (EDT)
- ZIP code: 27233
- GNIS feature ID: 983287

Climax is an unincorporated community on the border of Guilford and Randolph counties, North Carolina, United States. Its ZIP code is 27233. The center of the community is in Fentress Township in Guilford County, but development with Climax mailing addresses extends south into Providence Township in Randolph County. The community is located along North Carolina Highway 62, west of its junction with the U.S. Highway 421 freeway. North Carolina Highway 22 leads south from NC 62 in the east part of Climax into Randolph County. Climax is just south of the town of Pleasant Garden.

The community is home to the Hobson Cricket Grounds, where teams from the Mid Atlantic Cricket Conference compete. A small general aviation airport (Southeast Greensboro) is located in Climax, and the community was home to one of J.P. Morgan's quail hunting clubs known as the Climax Corporation.

== History ==
A post office called "Climax" has been in operation since 1891. The community was named for being located at a high point along the Atlantic & Yadkin Railway, as well as being situated near the northernmost point of Randolph County.
