= Virginia State Route 62 =

State highway in Halifax and Pittsylvania counties in Virginia, US

State Route 62
- Milton Highway

Route information
- Maintained by VDOT
- Length: 4.01 mi (6.45 km)
- Existed: 1946–present

Major junctions
- South end: NC 62 near Milton, NC
- North end: US 58 / US 360 / SR 726 east of Danville

Location
- Country: United States
- State: Virginia
- Counties: Halifax, Pittsylvania

Highway system
- Virginia Routes; Interstate; US; Primary; Secondary; Byways; History; HOT lanes
← SR 61	→ SR 63

State Route 62 (SR 62) is a primary state highway in the U.S. state of Virginia. Known as Milton Highway, the state highway runs 4.01 miles (6.45 km) from the North Carolina state line, where North Carolina Highway 62 (NC 62) continues into Milton, north to U.S. Route 58 (US 58) and US 360 east of Danville. SR 62 was assigned as a number upgrade of SR 726 to connect US 58 with NC 62 in 1946.

== Route description ==
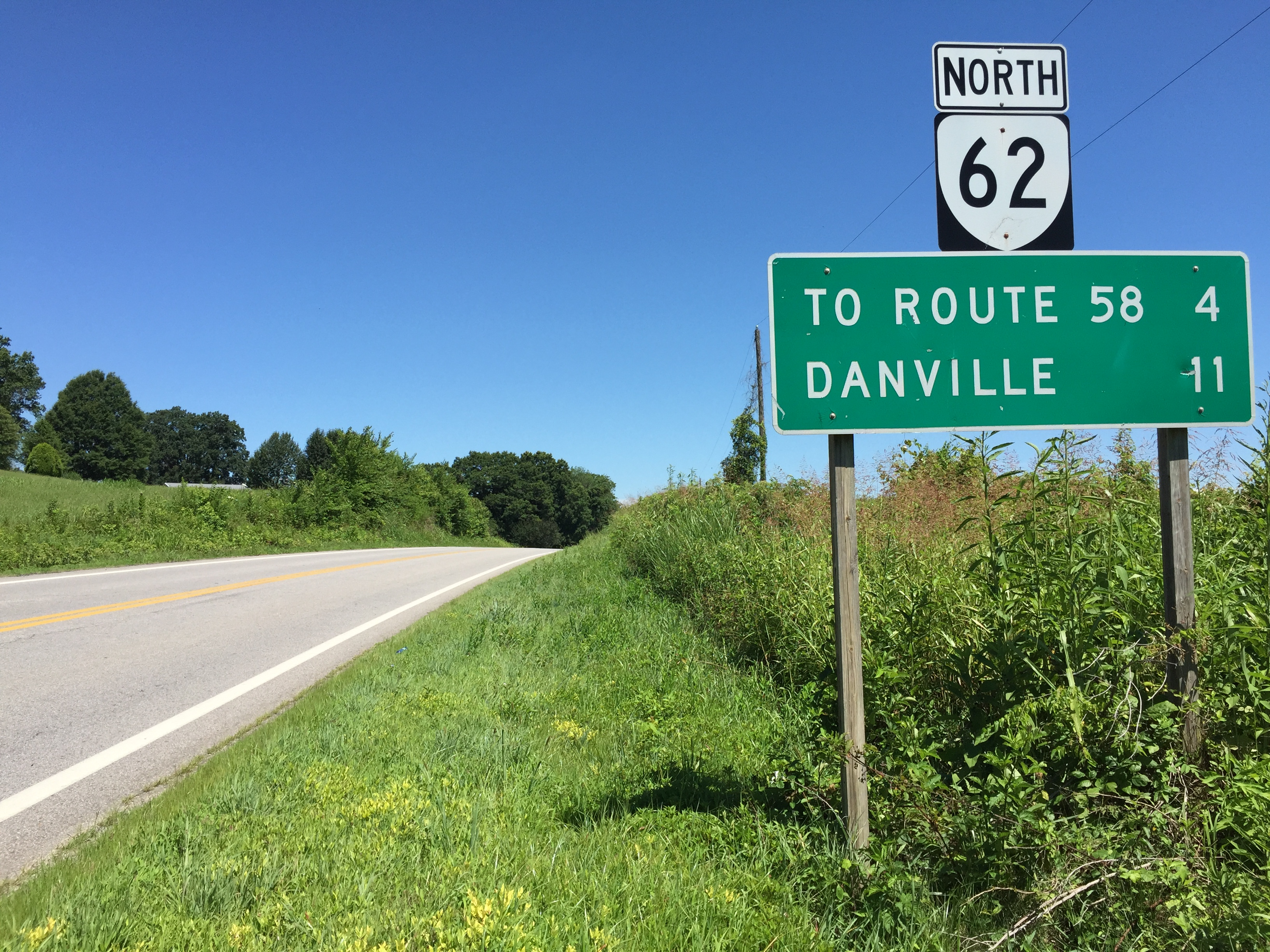
View north near the south end of SR 62 at NC 62 at the North Carolina state line

SR 62 begins at the North Carolina state line in the extreme southwestern corner of Halifax County. The roadway continues southeast as NC 62, which immediately crosses the Dan River into the town of Milton, where NC 62 turns south toward Burlington at its intersection with NC 57. Milton is just south of Virginia International Raceway, which lies on the east side of the Dan River. SR 62 almost immediately enters southeastern Pittsylvania County and remains in the county for the remainder of the route. It heads northwest through farmland to an intersection with US 58 and US 360 (Philpott Road) about 8 miles (13 km) east of downtown Danville. The roadway continues north as SR 726 (Ringgold Depot Road), which heads northwest toward Ringgold Depot.

== History ==
In the 1930s, present SR 62 was designated as part of State Route 726. SR 62 was transferred to the primary state highway system in 1946, connecting with North Carolina Highway 62 towards Roxboro and Oxford, North Carolina. The State Route 62 designation was already in use on a route in western Virginia; that route was renumbered to State Route 78.

== Major intersections ==
County	Location	mi	km	Destinations	Notes
Halifax		0.00	0.00	NC 62 south – Milton	North Carolina state line; southern terminus
Pittsylvania		4.01	6.45	US 58 / US 360 (South Boston Highway) / SR 726 north (Ringgold Depot Road) – Danville, South Boston	Northern terminus
1.000 mi = 1.609 km; 1.000 km = 0.621 mi
