= North Carolina Highway 99 =

State highway in North Carolina, US

North Carolina Highway 99
- NC 99 highlighted in red

Route information
- Maintained by NCDOT
- Length: 33.3 mi (53.6 km)
- Existed: c. 1940–present

Major junctions
- South end: NC 92 / NC 306 near Bayview
- US 264 in Belhaven
- North end: NC 32 / NC 45 near Plymouth

Location
- Country: United States
- State: North Carolina
- Counties: Beaufort, Hyde, Washington

Highway system
- North Carolina Highway System; Interstate; US; State; Scenic
← NC 98	→ NC 100

North Carolina Highway 99 (NC 99) is a primary state highway in the U.S. state of North Carolina in the central Coastal Plain region of the state. It runs from NC 92 and NC 306 east of Bath to NC 32 and NC 45 south of Plymouth. The highway serves the towns of Belhaven and Pantego. NC 99 also serves as a partial link between Bath, Belhaven and Plymouth. The highway primarily runs through rural regions of Beaufort County, Hyde County, and Washington County.

NC 99 was first established in 1935, running from U.S. Route 264 (US 264) 8 miles (13 km) east of Washington to NC 97 northwest of Pantego. The original highway was decommissioned by 1940 but was reestablished running from US 264 in Pantego to NC 32 south of Plymouth. NC 99 was extended south from Pantego to NC 92 and NC 306 in 1985, partially replacing NC 92 south of Belhaven.

== Route description ==
NC 99 begins at an intersection with NC 92 and NC 306 east of Bayview and Bath in Beaufort County. The intersection also marks the eastern terminus of NC 92 and the northern terminus of NC 306. From its southern terminus, NC 99 begins by heading to the east, running adjacent to the Pamlico River. The highway makes a northeastward turn 0.2 miles (0.32 km) of its southern terminus. It then runs through a rural area of Beaufort County, with farms, forested areas, and some sparse residential buildings located adjacent to the road. Following the crossing of a tributary of the Pamlico River, it makes several turns and begins running east. At an intersection with Secondary Road 1722 (SR 1722), NC 99 turns to the northeast toward Belhaven. It continues to the north for 3.5 miles (5.6 km) until crossing Pungo Creek, which drains to the Pungo River. NC 99 continues to the northeast, crossing the Pungo River and entering into Belhaven. It runs to the northeast in Belhaven, crossing a railroad operated by the Carolina Coastal Railway. Immediately after crossing the railroad, NC 99 intersects US 264 and US 264 Business at Main Street. NC 99 turns to concurrently follow US 264 to the northwest. The highways travel through a residential area of northwestern Belhaven before exiting the town.

Travelling north of Belhaven, US 264 and NC 99 generally parallel the Carolina Coastal Railway line. They cross an irrigation canal that connects to the Pungo River, 1.5 miles (2.4 km) north of Belhaven and continue north for 0.8 miles (1.3 km) before turning west toward Pantego. US 264 and NC 99 enter Pantego from the west, picking up the name Main Street and initially traveling through a residential area. NC 99 splits from US 264 in the central business district of Pantego, turning to the north. For 0.4 miles (0.64 km), NC 99 is routed to the northwest, largely paralleling the Pungo River. At an intersection with Swindell Road and Pungo Road, NC 99 turns to the northeast along Pungo Road. The highway enters a largely rural area between the Swindell Road intersection and its intersection NC 45. It makes several curves that give NC 99 a northerly orientation, and the highway begins to parallel a canal. An intersection with NC 45 is located southwest of Lake Phelps in Union Grove which marks the southern end of the NC 45 and NC 99 concurrency. NC 45 and NC 99 continue for 3.2 miles (5.1 km) to the northwest before exiting Beaufort County and entering Hyde County. The highways run for 0.1 miles (0.16 km) through a corner of Hyde County before entering into Washington County. NC 45 and NC 99 continue northwest for 7.9 miles (12.7 km) through rural Washington County. The northern terminus of NC 99 is located at an intersection with NC 32 and NC 45 south of Plymouth, marking the northern terminus of the NC 45 concurrency. At the intersection, NC 45 turns north to run concurrently with NC 32, providing access to Plymouth.

The North Carolina Department of Transportation (NCDOT) measures average daily traffic volumes along many of the roadways it maintains. In 2016, average daily traffic volumes along NC 99 varied from 1,100 vehicles per day southwest of the intersection with Sidney Road in Beaufort County to 5,400 vehicles per day southwest of the intersection with US 264 and US 264 Business in Belhaven. No section of NC 99 is included within the National Highway System, a network of highways in the United States which serve strategic transportation facilities, nor does it connect to the system at any point.

== History ==
=== Previous designation ===
North Carolina Highway 99
- Location: US 264–NC 97
- Length: 14 mi (23 km)
- Existed: 1935–1940

NC 99 first appeared on North Carolina state transportation maps in 1935 running from US 264 east of Bunyon to NC 97 approximately 9 miles (14 km) northwest of Pantego. The entire route was located in Beaufort County. The highway was approximately 14 miles (23 km) and followed a northeast–southwest direction between its termini. At its establishment, NC 99 followed a graded road for its entire length. By 1940, NC 99 was decommissioned and replaced by NC 32 northeast of Bunyon.

=== Current designation ===
The current designation of NC 99 first appeared on North Carolina state transportation maps in 1940, running from US 264 in Pantego to NC 32 south of Plymouth. At the time of establishment, NC 99 was considered a dirt road for its entire length. By 1946, NC 99 was upgraded to a gravel-topsoil road between its termini. Much of the road was paved by 1948, with the exception of a segment in Hyde County, southern Washington County, and northern Beaufort County. The remaining segment was paved by 1951. NC 45 was routed to run concurrently with NC 99 from Union Grove to NC 32 on August 1, 1980. On April 1, 1985, NC 99 was extended south along US 264 to Belhaven. South of Belhaven, NC 99 was routed to replace NC 92 to NC 306. The route of NC 99 has remained the same since 1985.

== Major intersections ==
County	Location	mi	km	Destinations	Notes
Beaufort		0.0	0.0	NC 92 west / NC 306 south (Bayview–Aurora Ferry) – Bath, Aurora	Southern terminus; Eastern terminus of NC 92; Northern terminus of NC 306
Beaufort	Belhaven	11.4	18.3	US 264 east / US 264 Bus. east (Main Street) – Swan Quarter	Eastern end of US 264 overlap
Beaufort	Pantego	15.1	24.3	US 264 west (Main Street) – Washington	Western end of US 264 overlap
Beaufort	Union Grove	22.0	35.4	NC 45 south / Bell Road – Pocosin Lakes National Wildlife Refuge	Southern end of NC 45 overlap
Hyde	No major junctions				
Washington		33.3	53.6	NC 32 north / NC 45 – Washington, Plymouth	Northern terminus; Northern end of NC 45 overlap
1.000 mi = 1.609 km; 1.000 km = 0.621 mi: Concurrency terminus

== See also ==
- North Carolina Bicycle Route 2 – Concurrent with NC 99 from its southern terminus to US 264 in Belhaven
