= Bayview, North Carolina =

- Census-designated place
- Location within North Carolina Location within the United States
- Coordinates: 35°26′13″N 76°47′31″W
- Country: United States
- State: North Carolina
- County: Beaufort

Area
  - Total: 1.05 sq mi (2.73 km^{2})
  - Land: 1.05 sq mi (2.73 km^{2})
  - Water: 0 sq mi (0.00 km^{2})
- Elevation: 7 ft (2.1 m)

Population (2020)
  - Total: 298
  - Density: 282.4/sq mi (109.02/km^{2})
- Time zone: UTC-5 (Eastern (EST))
  - Summer (DST): UTC-4 (EDT)
- ZIP code: 27808
- Area code: 252
- GNIS feature ID: 1018990
- FIPS code: 37-04040

Bayview is an unincorporated community and census-designated place (CDP) in Beaufort County, North Carolina, United States. As of the 2020 census, Bayview had a population of 298.

The community is located on the north bank of the Pamlico River, south of North Carolina Highway 92.

== Demographics ==
Historical population
Census	Pop.	Note	%±
2020	298		—
U.S. Decennial Census
