= Bath Creek =

Stream in Alberta, Canada

Coordinates: 51.44999°N 116.20218°W

Bath Creek is a stream in Alberta, Canada.

Bath Creek was named from an incident on 20 July 1881 when surveyor Major Rogers employed by Canadian Pacific Engineering was thrown from his horse into the creek.

== See also ==
- List of rivers of Alberta
