= Nelson, North Carolina =

- Unincorporated community
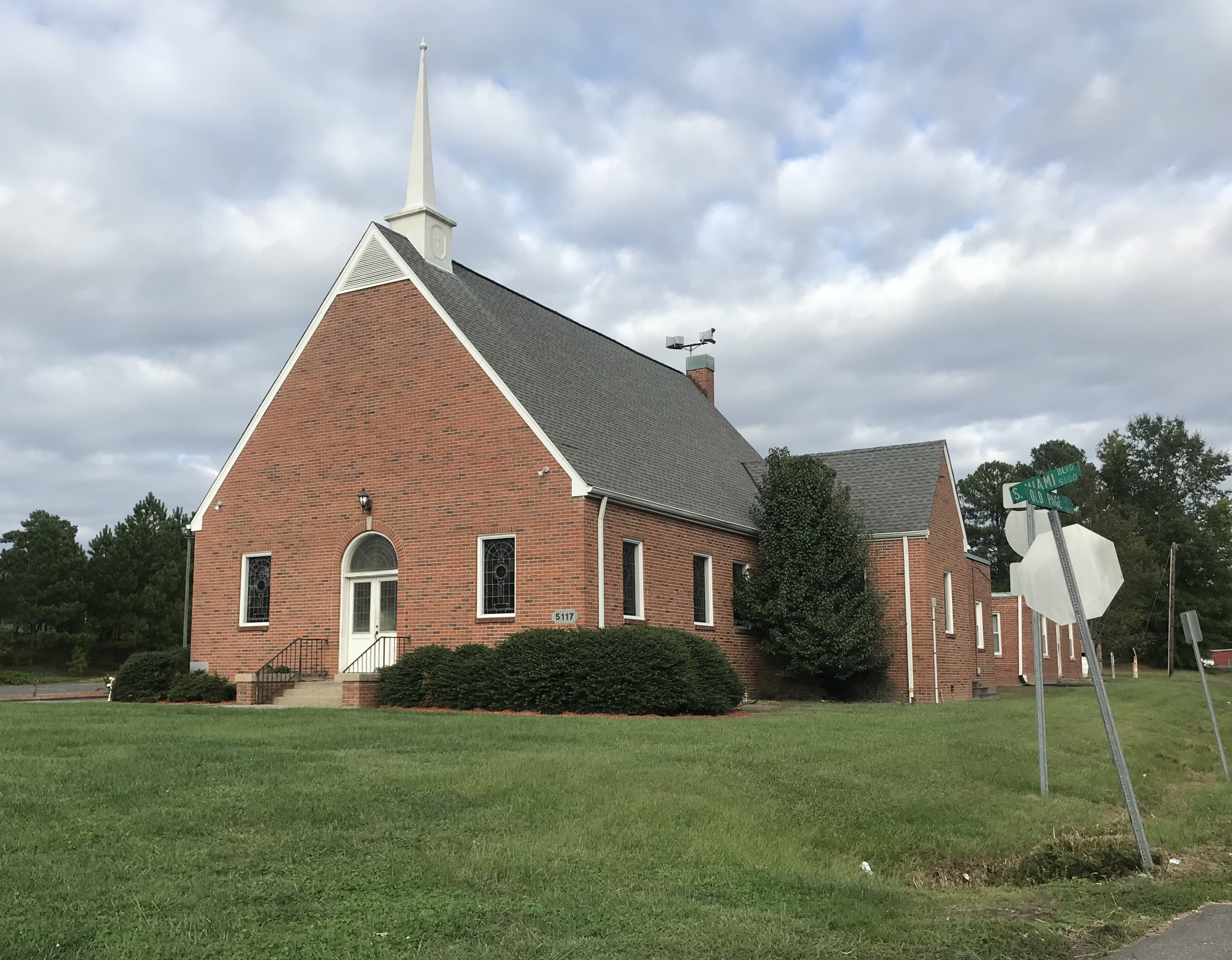
- Cedar Fork Baptist Church in Nelson

- Location within the state of North Carolina
- Coordinates: 35°52′55″N 78°51′0″W
- Country: United States
- State: North Carolina
- County: Durham
- Time zone: UTC-5 (Eastern (EST))
  - Summer (DST): UTC-4 (EDT)

Nelson was a community in Durham County, North Carolina, United States. The community was centered at the intersection of Miami Boulevard and North Carolina Highway 54. It was largely a farming community, with several tobacco and livestock farms as well as a tight knit family oriented community. Though still on the map, it has been all but erased by the growth surrounding the Research Triangle Park. All of the farms have been paved over and old farmhouses and barns torn down to accommodate the huge corporations and other business entities. A few of the older small homes are still there, as well as the Cedar Fork Baptist church, but the community itself essentially no longer exists.

== History ==
The area eventually comprising Nelson was settled by English colonists as early as 1773. Nelson originally formed as the Cedar Fork community, centered around the Cedar Fork Baptist Church, which was established in 1805. From 1860 to 1866 a post office operated there under the name of Cedar Fork, and in 1882 a post office operated under the name of Llewellyn. In 1880s, a small rail station was established along the North Carolina Railroad line in the area, and the post office was reestablished as Nelson in 1885. The post office was ordered closed in April 1915. By 2010, the original community had been largely overtaken by urban development centering around the Research Triangle Park.

== Works cited ==
- Anderson, Jean Bradley (2011). Durham County: A History of Durham County, North Carolina. Durham: Duke University Press. ISBN 9780822349839.
- Eubanks, Georgann (2010). Literary Trails of the North Carolina Piedmont: A Guidebook. Chapel Hill: University of North Carolina Press. ISBN 9780807899526.
