= Julian, North Carolina =

- Unincorporated community
- Location within North Carolina Location within the United States
- Coordinates: 35°54′18″N 79°39′37″W
- Country: United States
- State: North Carolina
- County: Guilford
- Elevation: 764 ft (233 m)
- Time zone: UTC-5 (Eastern (EST))
  - Summer (DST): UTC-4 (EDT)
- ZIP code: 27283
- GNIS feature ID: 1021000

Julian is an unincorporated community in southern Guilford County, North Carolina, United States. It lies along North Carolina Highway 62, just east of U.S. Route 421. It is 16 miles (26 km) southeast of the center of Greensboro and 7 miles (11 km) northwest of Liberty.

== Notable person ==
Artist MC Coble is from Julian.
