= Pleasant Garden, North Carolina =

- Town
- Seal
- Motto: "Remembering the Past, While Moving towards the Future"
- Location in Guilford County and the state of North Carolina.
- Coordinates: 35°57′34″N 79°45′35″W
- Country: United States
- State: North Carolina
- County: Guilford
- Established: 1757
- Incorporated: 1997

Area
  - Total: 15.15 sq mi (39.25 km^{2})
  - Land: 15.04 sq mi (38.95 km^{2})
  - Water: 0.12 sq mi (0.31 km^{2})
- Elevation: 807 ft (246 m)

Population (2020)
  - Total: 5,000
  - Density: 332.5/sq mi (128.39/km^{2})
- Time zone: UTC-5 (Eastern (EST))
  - Summer (DST): UTC-4 (EDT)
- ZIP code: 27313
- Area code: 336
- FIPS code: 37-52760
- GNIS feature ID: 2407133
- Website: Official Website of Pleasant Garden, North Carolina

Pleasant Garden is a town in Guilford County, North Carolina, United States.

As of the 2020 census, the town's population was 5,000.

== History ==
Incorporated in 1997 from Fentress Township, Pleasant Garden was first settled in 1786, and known as a business district by that name from at least 1876.

== Geography ==
Pleasant Garden is situated south of Greensboro, west of Forest Oaks, and north of Climax. It is bordered both east and west by U.S. Route 421 and Old U.S. Highway 220 (Randleman Road) (Respectively), and to the north by Interstate 85.

According to the United States Census Bureau, the town has a total area of 15.4 square miles (40 km^{2}), of which 15.3 square miles (40 km^{2}) is land and 0.04 square miles (0.10 km^{2}) (0.26%) is water.

== Demographics ==
Historical population
Census	Pop.	Note	%±
1980	1,991		—
1990	2,228		11.9%
2000	4,714		111.6%
2010	4,489		−4.8%
2020	5,000		11.4%
2022 (est.)	5,020	▲	0.4%
U.S. Decennial Census

=== 2020 census ===
As of the 2020 census, Pleasant Garden had a population of 5,000. The median age was 46.6 years. 20.3% of residents were under the age of 18 and 23.5% of residents were 65 years of age or older. For every 100 females there were 94.1 males, and for every 100 females age 18 and over there were 92.0 males age 18 and over.

42.3% of residents lived in urban areas, while 57.7% lived in rural areas.

There were 1,924 households in Pleasant Garden, of which 29.6% had children under the age of 18 living in them. Of all households, 55.2% were married-couple households, 16.4% were households with a male householder and no spouse or partner present, and 23.4% were households with a female householder and no spouse or partner present. About 23.0% of all households were made up of individuals and 12.0% had someone living alone who was 65 years of age or older.

There were 2,051 housing units, of which 6.2% were vacant. The homeowner vacancy rate was 0.7% and the rental vacancy rate was 9.4%.

Pleasant Garden racial composition
Race	Number	Percentage
White (non-Hispanic)	3,594	71.88%
Black or African American (non-Hispanic)	792	15.84%
Native American	18	0.36%
Asian	28	0.56%
Pacific Islander	4	0.08%
Other/Mixed	193	3.86%
Hispanic or Latino	371	7.42%

=== 2000 census ===
As of the census of 2000, there were 4,714 people, 1,783 households, and 1,383 families residing in the town. The population density was 307.2 inhabitants per square mile (118.6/km^{2}). There were 1,874 housing units at an average density of 122.1 per square mile (47.1/km^{2}). The racial makeup of the town was 85.19% White, 11.24% African American, 1.08% Native American, 0.23% Asian, 0.02% Pacific Islander, 1.04% from other races, and 1.19% from two or more races. Hispanic or Latino of any race were 1.63% of the population.

There were 1,783 households, out of which 34.1% had children under the age of 18 living with them, 65.3% were married couples living together, 8.4% had a female householder with no husband present, and 22.4% were non-families. 18.4% of all households were made up of individuals, and 7.6% had someone living alone who was 65 years of age or older. The average household size was 2.62 and the average family size was 2.97.

In the town, the population was spread out, with 25.0% under the age of 18, 5.6% from 18 to 24, 29.3% from 25 to 44, 27.9% from 45 to 64, and 12.2% who were 65 years of age or older. The median age was 39 years. For every 100 females, there were 96.0 males. For every 100 females age 18 and over, there were 93.5 males.

The median income for a household in the town was $45,833, and the median income for a family was $51,818. Males had a median income of $36,052 versus $29,778 for females. The per capita income for the town was $20,679. About 8.0% of families and 8.9% of the population were below the poverty line, including 10.5% of those under age 18 and 13.5% of those age 65 or over.

== 2011 shooting spree ==
On November 20, 2011, 36-year old Mary Ann Holder, armed with a .38-caliber revolver, shot and killed her 17-year-old son Robert Smith, fatally wounded his 15-year-old girlfriend Makayla Woods, and fatally wounded her niece and nephew, 8-year-old Hanna Leigh Suttles and 17-year-old Richard Suttles while they all slept in their beds. She then drove in her SUV to GTCC Airport and shot her ex-affair partner, 40-year-old Randall Lamb, in the shoulder. She then drove to the home where her son, 14-year-old Zack Smith, was staying and picked him up. Holder then shot her son and herself in the car. Most of the young people, except Robert Smith who was pronounced dead at the scene, initially survived the shooting, but subsequently died from their injuries in the days following the incident, with Richard being the last one to succumb.

=== Possible motive ===
Holder left notes taking responsibility for the shootings and apologizing for the pain she was causing, Guilford County Sheriff BJ Barnes said. The notes also indicate Holder was angry about how her relationship with Lamb came to an end. Police also believed the shootings were pre-arranged.

== Notable people ==
- Dennis Byrd, defensive tackle at North Carolina State, member of the College Football Hall of Fame
- Joey Hackett, former NFL tight end
- Shane Hmiel, former NASCAR driver
