= North Carolina Highway 92 =

State highway in Beaufort County, North Carolina, US

North Carolina Highway 92

Route information
- Maintained by NCDOT
- Length: 20.7 mi (33.3 km)

Major junctions
- West end: US 264 / US 17 Bus. in Washington
- NC 32 in Douglas Crossroads; US 264 near Bath
- East end: NC 99 / NC 306 in Bayview

Location
- Country: United States
- State: North Carolina
- Counties: Beaufort

Highway system
- North Carolina Highway System; Interstate; US; State; Scenic
← NC 91	→ NC 93

North Carolina Highway 92 (NC 92) is a primary state highway in the U.S. state of North Carolina. It runs through connecting Washington and Bath, entirely in Beaufort County.

== Route description ==
NC 92 begins at the intersection of North Bridge Street and West 5th Street in downtown Washington, the county seat of Beaufort County. North Bridge Street carries US 17 Business north and south while West 5th Street carries US 264 east and west. NC 92 and US 264 run along a concurrency from this point and travel east-southeast through a mix of businesses, houses, and open space. After 1/2 mile (0.80 km) the road curves to the north and the road name changes to John Small Avenue. Since the beginning of the road, the width was one lane in each direction with a center turn lane. About 1 mile (1.6 km) from the start, the roadway widens to two lanes in each direction with a center turn lane and it passes some schools and more businesses and houses. As it exits the city limits, US 264 and NC 92 begin to head into a more sparsely populated area of the county, crossing a railroad at-grade and passing Beaufort County Community College. At Douglas Crossroads, NC 32 intersects the highway. Past this intersection, the highway narrows to two lanes in each direction. 3 miles (4.8 km) past NC 32 at the community of Midway, US 264 bends towards the north while NC 92 breaks off the concurrency and heads on a two-lane road east towards Bath.

After crossing the Bath Creek on a 1,000-foot-long (300 m) bridge, the road enters the town limits of Bath. In Bath, NC 92 carries the name Carteret Street through the town and its historic district. The road bends to the southeast and intersects Bayview Avenue which provides access to the census-designated place of the same name. For the road's last 3 miles (4.8 km), it is bounded on the north by farmland and on the south by a thick patch of forest staying no more than 1/2 mile (0.80 km) north of the Pamlico River. At the community of Gaylord, NC 92 ends at the intersection of NC 99 and NC 306. This point marks the southern terminus of NC 99 which continues northeast towards Belhaven and the northern terminus of NC 306, only 1/4 mile (0.40 km) north of the North Carolina Department of Transportation Ferry Division's Bayview-Aurora Ferry.

== History ==
NC 92 first appeared on the June 1, 1926 edition of the North Carolina State Transportation map. The western terminus of the highway was located at NC 91 northeast of Jessama. From that point, it ran to the southeast, ending in Bath. All of NC 92 was paved at the time of establishment. By 1933, the eastern terminus of NC 92 was extended south to Bayview. It followed its modern alignment between Bath and Bayview Road but turned south at the Bayview Road intersection and ended in Bayview. In 1931, the entire alignment between Bath and Bayview was considered a graded road but was paved by 1935. The routing remained the same until January 31, 1963, when NCDOT removed NC 92 from Bayview Road and moved the eastern terminus to Belhaven. The highway followed its modern-day routing to NC 306 and then followed the modern routing NC 99 to the northeast. The highway crossed Pungo Creek and Pantego Creek before entering Belhaven and ending at US 264 and US 264 Business in Belhaven. On April 1, 1985, NC 92 was eliminated between NC 306 and Belhaven, with the old routing replaced by an extension of NC 99. The western terminus of NC 92 was later moved to Washington, on May 12, 1986. The highway was routed to run concurrently with US 264 between US 17 in Washington and its former western terminus at the intersection of US 264 and NC 92 northwest of Bayview.

== Major intersections ==
The entire route is in Beaufort County.

Location	mi	km	Destinations	Notes
Washington	0.0	0.0	US 264 west (Pactolous Highway) – Greenville US 17 Bus. (North Bridge Street) – Williamston	Western terminus of US 264/NC 92 overlap
Douglas Crossroads	6.4	10.3	NC 32 – Plymouth	
Midway	9.2	14.8	US 264 east – Pantego	Eastern terminus of US 264/NC 92 overlap
Gaylord	20.7	33.3	NC 99 north / NC 306 south (Bayview-Aurora Ferry) – Belhaven, Aurora	Eastern terminus of NC 92; northern terminus of NC 306
1.000 mi = 1.609 km; 1.000 km = 0.621 mi

== See also ==
- North Carolina Bicycle Route 2 - Concurrent with NC 92 from Harvey Road near Midway to its eastern terminus
