= Havelock, North Carolina =

- City
- Flag Seal
- Motto: Gateway to Cherry Point
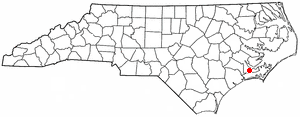
- Location of Havelock, North Carolina
- Coordinates: 34°54′30″N 76°53′55″W
- Country: United States
- State: North Carolina
- County: Craven

Area
  - Total: 18.15 sq mi (47.02 km^{2})
  - Land: 17.09 sq mi (44.25 km^{2})
  - Water: 1.07 sq mi (2.77 km^{2})
- Elevation: 23 ft (7.0 m)

Population (2020)
  - Total: 16,621
  - Density: 972.7/sq mi (375.58/km^{2})
- Time zone: UTC−5 (Eastern (EST))
  - Summer (DST): UTC−4 (EDT)
- ZIP codes: 28532-28533
- Area code: 252
- FIPS code: 37-30120
- GNIS feature ID: 2404663
- Website: www.havelocknc.us

Havelock is a city in Craven County, North Carolina, United States. As of the 2020 census, Havelock had a population of 16,621. The city is home to Marine Corps Air Station Cherry Point, the world's largest Marine Corps air station, and home to the 2nd Marine Aircraft Wing.

Havelock is part of the New Bern, NC Micropolitan Statistical Area.

== History ==
Havelock is one of eight cities in the world named after Sir Henry Havelock, a British officer in India, who distinguished himself in 1857 during what was known as the Indian Mutiny. The area was originally named "Havelock Station" in the late 1850s, when the Atlantic and North Carolina Railroad built a depot where its right-of-way crossed what is now Miller Boulevard.

The town was the initial landing point for a Civil War battle known as the Battle of New Bern. On March 11, 1862, Brigadier General Ambrose Burnside's command embarked from Roanoke Island to rendezvous with Union gunboats at Hatteras Inlet for an expedition against New Bern. On March 13, the fleet sailed up the Neuse River, anchored at Slocum Creek, and disembarked infantry on the river's south bank. Elements of the Rhode Island Heavy Artillery came ashore near the present-day location of the Officers' Club on Cherry Point Marine Corps Air Station and also near the Carolina Pines Golf and Country Club. After the capture of New Bern, the Federals transited Havelock on their way to the Battle of Fort Macon. Despite several Confederate attempts to reclaim New Bern and the surrounding area, the Federals did not withdraw until after the end of the war. During one of the attempts, however, the Union-built blockhouse fort on Havelock's Slocom Creek was burned in 1864. A diorama model of the Civil War fort is on exhibit at the Havelock Tourist & Events Center along with other displays of Havelock and Cherry Point history.

Existing records indicate that the production of naval supplies including turpentine and tar were very important in the local economy during the 19th century. With the invention of the steam engine, the demand for tar and turpentine slowly evaporated as fewer wooden ships were constructed. Many distillers of turpentine turned to the production of moonshine to make ends meet.

In 1940, Havelock became the home of Marine Corps Air Station Cherry Point. MCAS Cherry Point's Fleet Readiness Center East employs many residents of the town. In 1959 the town was officially established.

Jimmy Sanders Sr.served as the mayor of the city from 1987 until the election of former city commissioner William L. Lewis, Jr. in 2013 by a vote of 624–319.

A park in Havelock is named after Rep. Walter B. Jones, Jr.

== Media ==
Havelock News is a newspaper based in Havelock, North Carolina. On June 1, 2012, Freedom Communications announced the sale of Havelock News and other newspapers in Freedom's Eastern North Carolina operating group to Halifax Media Group of Daytona Beach, Florida.

== Geography ==
Havelock is located in southern Craven County. The city limits encompass most of Marine Corps Air Station Cherry Point and extend as far north as the tidal Neuse River. Slocum Creek is a tidal inlet that extends south from the Neuse as far as the center of Havelock.

According to the United States Census Bureau, the city has a total area of 17.6 square miles (45.7 km^{2}), of which 16.8 square miles (43.6 km^{2}) is land and 0.81 square miles (2.1 km^{2}), or 4.56%, is water.

=== Climate ===
Havelock has a humid subtropical climate (Köppen Cfa) with long, hot summers and short, mild winters.

Climate data for Havelock, North Carolina (Marine Corps Air Station Cherry Point) (1991–2020 normals, extremes 1945–2018)
Month	Jan	Feb	Mar	Apr	May	Jun	Jul	Aug	Sep	Oct	Nov	Dec	Year
Record high °F (°C)	86 (30)	84 (29)	92 (33)	97 (36)	101 (38)	104 (40)	102 (39)	102 (39)	100 (38)	97 (36)	89 (32)	82 (28)	104 (40)
Mean maximum °F (°C)	73.6 (23.1)	75.8 (24.3)	82.3 (27.9)	87.6 (30.9)	91.8 (33.2)	95.7 (35.4)	96.7 (35.9)	95.5 (35.3)	91.2 (32.9)	85.8 (29.9)	80.2 (26.8)	75.2 (24.0)	98.1 (36.7)
Mean daily maximum °F (°C)	57.1 (13.9)	59.5 (15.3)	65.7 (18.7)	74.0 (23.3)	81.0 (27.2)	87.4 (30.8)	89.8 (32.1)	88.6 (31.4)	84.0 (28.9)	76.0 (24.4)	67.0 (19.4)	60.3 (15.7)	74.2 (23.4)
Daily mean °F (°C)	46.7 (8.2)	48.9 (9.4)	54.6 (12.6)	63.0 (17.2)	70.8 (21.6)	78.2 (25.7)	81.3 (27.4)	80.2 (26.8)	75.8 (24.3)	65.9 (18.8)	56.3 (13.5)	50.0 (10.0)	64.3 (17.9)
Mean daily minimum °F (°C)	36.3 (2.4)	38.2 (3.4)	43.5 (6.4)	52.1 (11.2)	60.5 (15.8)	68.9 (20.5)	72.7 (22.6)	71.9 (22.2)	67.5 (19.7)	55.7 (13.2)	45.6 (7.6)	39.6 (4.2)	54.4 (12.4)
Mean minimum °F (°C)	15.9 (−8.9)	20.1 (−6.6)	24.3 (−4.3)	32.9 (0.5)	43.4 (6.3)	53.4 (11.9)	61.6 (16.4)	58.2 (14.6)	49.8 (9.9)	34.3 (1.3)	24.8 (−4.0)	21.7 (−5.7)	14.5 (−9.7)
Record low °F (°C)	−2 (−19)	10 (−12)	3 (−16)	27 (−3)	33 (1)	44 (7)	52 (11)	57 (14)	45 (7)	26 (−3)	18 (−8)	0 (−18)	−2 (−19)
Average precipitation inches (mm)	4.07 (103)	3.40 (86)	3.56 (90)	3.52 (89)	3.94 (100)	4.87 (124)	7.38 (187)	7.21 (183)	8.20 (208)	3.81 (97)	3.76 (96)	3.70 (94)	57.42 (1,458)
Average snowfall inches (cm)	0.6 (1.5)	0.1 (0.25)	0.0 (0.0)	0.0 (0.0)	0.0 (0.0)	0.0 (0.0)	0.0 (0.0)	0.0 (0.0)	0.0 (0.0)	0.0 (0.0)	0.0 (0.0)	0.1 (0.25)	0.8 (2.0)
Average precipitation days (≥ 0.01 in)	10.4	10.2	10.5	8.9	9.6	10.8	12.9	13.0	10.5	8.8	8.8	11.1	125.5
Average snowy days (≥ 0.1 in)	0.2	0.2	0.0	0.0	0.0	0.0	0.0	0.0	0.0	0.0	0.0	0.2	0.6
Source: NOAA

== Demographics ==
Historical population
Census	Pop.	Note	%±
1960	2,433		—
1970	3,012		23.8%
1980	17,718		488.2%
1990	20,268		14.4%
2000	22,442		10.7%
2010	20,735		−7.6%
2020	16,621		−19.8%
U.S. Decennial Census

=== 2020 census ===
As of the 2020 census, Havelock had a population of 16,621. There were 5,708 households and 4,553 families residing in the city. The median age was 26.3 years. 23.2% of residents were under the age of 18 and 8.9% of residents were 65 years of age or older. For every 100 females there were 114.8 males, and for every 100 females age 18 and over there were 117.7 males age 18 and over.

97.9% of residents lived in urban areas, while 2.1% lived in rural areas.

Of all households, 36.8% had children under the age of 18 living in them. 51.3% were married-couple households, 17.1% were households with a male householder and no spouse or partner present, and 25.0% were households with a female householder and no spouse or partner present. About 22.4% of all households were made up of individuals and 5.6% had someone living alone who was 65 years of age or older. There were 6,545 housing units, of which 12.8% were vacant. The homeowner vacancy rate was 2.7% and the rental vacancy rate was 10.0%.

Havelock racial composition
Race	Number	Percentage
White (non-Hispanic)	9,465	56.95%
Black or African American (non-Hispanic)	2,787	16.77%
Native American	66	0.4%
Asian	522	3.14%
Pacific Islander	88	0.53%
Other/Mixed	1,288	7.75%
Hispanic or Latino	2,405	14.47%

=== 2010 census ===
At the 2010 United States census there were 20,735 people, 6,409 households, and 5,073 families living in the city. The racial makeup of the city was 70.0% White (64.0% Non-Hispanic White), 0.7% Native American, 17.4% African American, 2.9% Asian, 0.3% Native Hawaiian and Other Pacific Islander, 4.0% from other races, and 4.7% from two or more races. Hispanic or Latino of any race were 11.6% of the population.

=== 2000 census ===
As of the census of 2000, there were 22,442 people, 6,411 households, and 5,276 families living in the city. The population density was 1,342.9 inhabitants per square mile (518.5/km^{2}). There were 6,783 housing units at an average density of 405.9 per square mile (156.7/km^{2}). The racial makeup of the city was 70.48% White, 18.53% African American, 0.78% Native American, 2.54% Asian, 0.15% Pacific Islander, 3.94% from other races, and 3.58% from two or more races. Hispanic or Latino of any race were 9.01% of the population.

There were 6,411 households, out of which 52.5% had children under the age of 18 living with them, 69.3% were married couples living together, 10.0% had a female householder with no husband present, and 17.7% were non-families. 13.7% of all households were made up of individuals, and 2.5% had someone living alone who was 65 years of age or older. The average household size was 2.91 and the average family size was 3.19.

In the city, the population was spread out, with 28.2% under the age of 18, 29.0% from 18 to 24, 30.2% from 25 to 44, 9.6% from 45 to 64, and 3.1% who were 65 years of age or older. The median age was 23 years. For every 100 females, there were 133.9 males. For every 100 females age 18 and over, there were 147.2 males.

The median income for a household in the city was $35,351, and the median income for a family was $37,000. Males had a median income of $22,048 versus $18,322 for females. The per capita income for the city was $15,586. About 6.8% of families and 8.6% of the population were below the poverty line, including 12.0% of those under age 18 and 8.3% of those age 65 or over.

== Highways ==
Havelock's main highway is U.S. 70, which runs west to east through the center of town. There is also N.C. 101 (Fontana Boulevard) from which two entrances to Marine Corps Air Station Cherry Point are located. A U.S. 70 bypass around the city is scheduled to begin construction in winter 2017. New Bern, the Craven County seat, is 19 miles (31 km) to the northwest via U.S. 70, while Morehead City, gateway to the Crystal Coast beaches along the Atlantic Ocean, is 17 miles (27 km) to the southeast.

== Building on a landfill ==
The city of Havelock began building out in the 1960s and 1970s. Some homes in the town were built over a landfill in the 1970s, which land at that time was still owned by Craven County and not by Havelock. It appears that the old landfill was last used in the 1940s and 1950s. However, many houses appear to be sinking.

== Education ==
=== College ===
- Craven Community College

=== High school ===
- Havelock High School
- Early College EAST High School

=== Middle schools ===
- Havelock Middle School
- Tucker Creek Middle School

=== Elementary schools ===
- Havelock Elementary School
- Arthur W. Edwards Elementary School (Formally known as West Havelock Elementary)
- Graham A. Barden Elementary School
- Roger R. Bell Elementary School
- W. Jesse Gurganus Elementary School

=== Private schools ===
- Gramercy
- Annunciation Catholic School (1956)

== Notable people ==
- Kristin Armstrong, three-time Olympic gold medalist in women's road cycling
- Ky Bowman, professional basketball player for the Golden State Warriors
- Bruce Carter, NFL linebacker
- Pharoh Cooper, NFL wide receiver and kick returner
- William M. Faulkner, United States Marine Corps Lieutenant General
- Dennis Mitchell, Olympic track and field athlete
- Corey Robinson, NFL offensive tackle
- William L. Wainwright, former member of the North Carolina General Assembly
- Guy Whimper, NFL offensive guard and Super Bowl champion with Pittsburgh Steelers
