= Roanoke Island Festival Park =

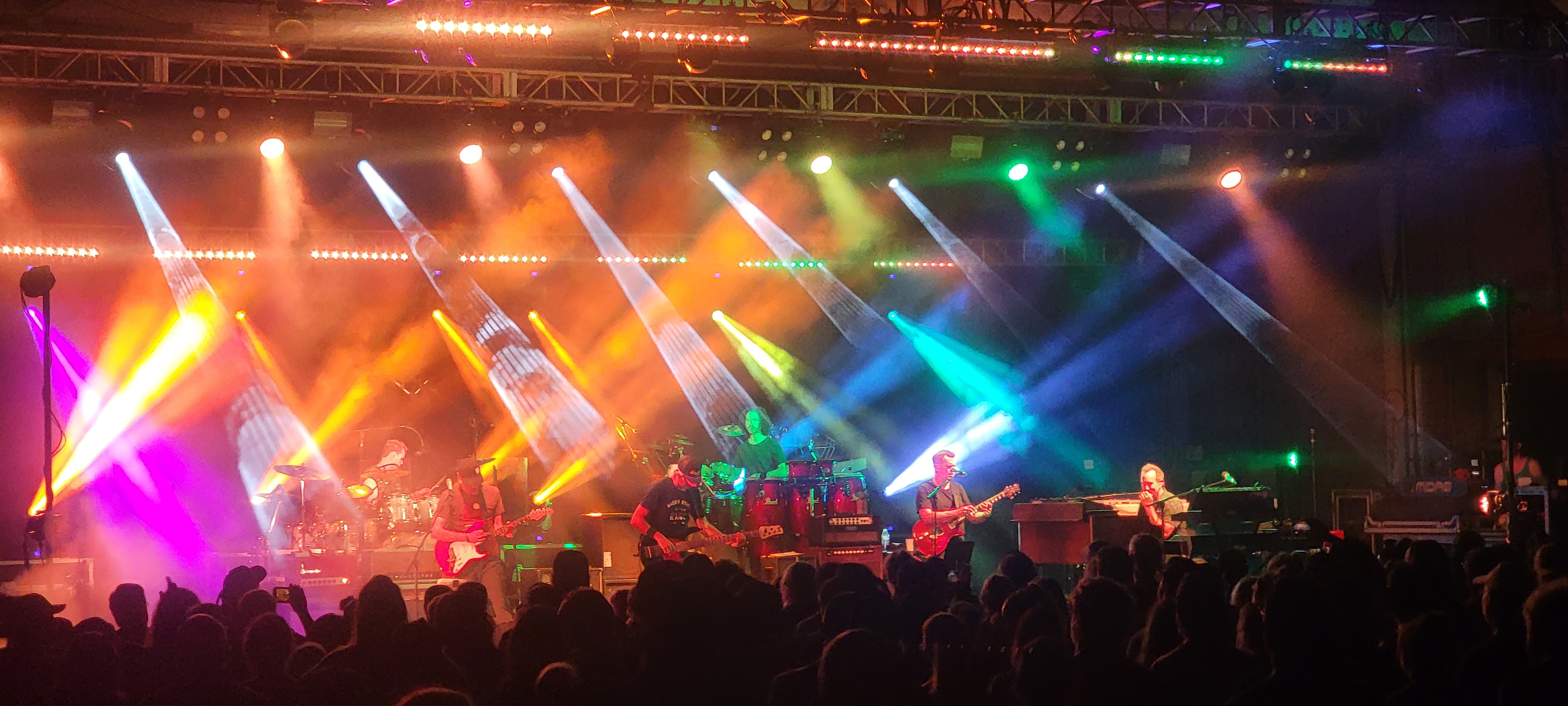
Umphrey's McGee Concert at Roanoke Island Festival Park

Roanoke Island Festival Park is a North Carolina state historic site located at the end of NC 400 in Manteo, North Carolina on Roanoke Island. The park includes a recreated 16th-century sailing ship, living history demonstrators, a museum, and a variety of performing and visual arts. Admission includes the main attractions and is valid for two days.

== Features ==
=== Roanoke Adventure Museum ===
The Roanoke Adventure Museum is an interactive museum about the history of Roanoke Island and the Outer Banks. Exhibits include the colonial-era English settlers and Native Americans, ships and maritime history, Civil War history, including the local Freedmen's Colony, and a 1900s era general store display. Multiple displays include hands-on activities for children.

=== Elizabeth II ship ===
The Elizabeth II is a full-size representative 16th-century sailing ship that was designed and named after one of the seven ships used by Sir Walter Raleigh's fleet when he first brought colonists to Roanoke Island in 1587. The ship is a square-rigged barque with three masts, and 69 feet long, 17 feet wide and draws 8 feet of water. Guides dressed in period clothing portray the seamen and colonists who traveled to Roanoke with the fleet.

The ship was commissioned to be part of the 400th anniversary celebration of the founding of Roanoke and America. Launched in 1983, she was presented to the state as a State Historic Site on July 13, 1984 during ceremonies to commemorate the 400th anniversary of the arrival of the first English ships to the North Carolina Outer Banks.

=== Settlement Site ===
Costumed interpreters at the Settlement Site portray the colonists living and working as they did when the island was settled. Visitors can try blacksmithing, woodworking and colonial games, and see how the colonists lived, farmed and cooked. Soldiers display the weapons and armor they used to protect themselves. Other trade crafts include shoemaking, carpentry, leatherworking and canvas works.

=== The Legend of Two Path ===
The "Legend of Two Path" is a 50-minute drama documentary film that portrays the views of the Algonquians about the arrival of the English colonists. The film was produced by the School of Film Making at University of North Carolina School of the Arts, and is shown several times a day in the 242-seat Film Theater.

=== American Indian Town ===
Also on the grounds of the Roanoke Island Festival Park is a recreation of an American Indian settlement that would have been typical of the time period, such as that of the Croatan people, who were native to the area when Roanoke Colony was founded.

=== Outer Banks History Center ===
The Outer Banks History Center, located in Manteo, across from Roanoke Island, is a public research facility focused on the history of the Outer Banks. The Center features permanent and changing exhibits of local history, and is open on weekdays. The Center is operated by the North Carolina Division of Archives & History as a regional component of the North Carolina State Archives, and houses many archival historic materials including books, magazines, journals, microforms, personal and organizational papers, manuscripts, photographs, maps, oral history tapes and ephemera.

=== The Pavilion at Roanoke Island Festival Park ===
The Outdoor Pavilion at Roanoke Island Festival Park has modern technology and entertainment. Roanoke Sound’s water surrounds the 3,800 square foot stage and provides a consistently charming backdrop for concerts, weddings and performances. The expansive lawn (2 acres) provides seating for up to 3,500 people.
