= Toluca, North Carolina =

Unincorporated community in North Carolina, US

Coordinates: 35°31′45″N 81°30′39″W

Toluca is an unincorporated community in Lincoln and Cleveland counties, North Carolina, United States.
