= List of North Carolina Scenic Byways =

North Carolina Scenic Byways
- Highway marker

System information
- Length: 2,300 mi (3,700 km)
- Formed: March 1990

Highway names
- Interstates: Interstate X (I-X)
- US Highways: US Highway X (US X)
- State: North Carolina Highway X (NC X)

System links
- North Carolina Highway System; Interstate; US; State; Scenic

The North Carolina Scenic Byways consists of roads in the state of North Carolina that travel through areas of scenic, historic, and cultural significance. Launched in March 1990, the scenic byway program has presently 59 designated byways, including three national scenic byways and one all American road, a total of 2,300 miles (3,700 km). The intent of this system is to provide travelers with a safe and interesting alternate route.

== National scenic byways ==
Region	Name	Image	Description	mi	km	References
Mountain	Blue Ridge Parkway		Considered the original scenic byway, the parkway is recognized as an "All-American Road" for its spectacular mountain and valley vistas, waterfalls, and colorful flower and foliage displays. Various activities are available along the route and five campgrounds for overnight visitors. The highest point is at Richland-Balsam Gap at 6,053 feet (1,845 m).	242.0	389.5	
Mountain	Cherohala Skyway		Traversing along NC 143, from the Tennessee state line to Santeetlah Gap, in the Nantahala National Forest. The skyway features cultural heritage of the Cherokee tribe and early settlers in a grand forest environment in the Appalachian Mountains.	17.8	28.6	
Mountain	Forest Heritage Scenic Byway		Traversing along US 276, this scenic byway through the Pisgah National Forest features the Cradle of Forestry, waterfalls, trails and scenic vistas. The longer 76.7-mile (123.4 km) National Forest Scenic Byway completes a loop via NC 28 and US 64, connecting Lake Logan and the town of Brevard.	17.6	28.3	
Mountain	Newfound Gap Road Byway		Completely within the Great Smoky Mountains National Park, Newfound Gap Road (US 441) begins at the intersection with the Blue Ridge Parkway, located nearby the Qualla Boundary of the Eastern Band of Cherokee Indians. Recognized as an "All-American Road" for being both historic and scenic, the byway travels northwesterly to the Tennessee state line at Newfound Gap. Various overlooks dot along the way, with unique attractions nearby including the Oconaluftee Visitor Center, Mingus Mill, and Clingmans Dome Observation Tower at the summit of Kuwohi.	16.5	26.6	
Coastal Plain	Outer Banks Scenic Byway		Traversing along US 70 and NC 12, the byway connects from the mainland to the barrier islands, via ferry. Both the Cape Lookout National Seashore and Cape Hatteras National Seashore are along its route, as well as national wildlife refuges, tourist beaches, lighthouses and unique maritime culture and historical sites.	137.8	221.8	

== State scenic byways ==
Region	Name	Image	Description	mi	km	References
Mountain	Waterfall Byway		Follows Harshaw Road (SR 1558), Brasstown Road (SR 1134), Old US 64 (SR 1100), Settawig Road (SR 1135) and US 64. Named for the 200 waterfalls that surround the route, it passes by notable sites including the Cullasaja Gorge, Highlands, Cashiers and Lake Toxaway.	98.0	157.7	
Mountain	Nantahala Byway		The byway traverses between Marble and Whittier, along US 19/US 74/US 129. It is known for its scenic views of the Nantahala Gorge, The Great Smoky Mountain Railroad, and the whitewater rafting on the Nantahala River.	43.0	69.2	
Mountain	Fontana Byway		The byway traverses along NC 28, from Deals Gap to the historic Cherokee town of Cowee. The byway points of interest includes the "Tail of the Dragon," Fontana Dam, Fontana Village, and the Needmore Tract.	60.0	96.6	
Mountain	Whitewater Way		NC 281	9.0	14.5	
Mountain	Appalachian Medley		US 25 / US 70 / NC 209 / NC 213	45.0	72.4	
Mountain	Big Horse Creek Scenic Byway		NC 194	18.0	29.0	
Mountain	French Broad Overview		US 25 Bus. / US 70 Bus. / NC 251	17.0	27.4	
Mountain	Historic Flat Rock Scenic Byway		The byway is located along NC 225, between Pinnacle Mountain Road (SR 1114) and Highland Lake Road (SR 1783), in the Flat Rock area. It is noted for its views of nearby Glassy and McAlpin mountains and access to the Carl Sandburg Home National Historic Site, the Flat Rock Playhouse and the Flat Rock Historic District.	8.3	13.4	
Mountain	Drovers Road		US 74A	16.5	26.6	
Mountain	Black Mountain Rag		Follows US 64, from Edneyville to Lake Lure and NC 9, from Bat Cave to Black Mountain. The byway connects Chimney Rock State Park, Hickory Nut Gorge and Lake Lure. It is named after old fiddle tune, the Black Mountain Rag, for its full of twists, turns, ups and downs.	31.0	49.9	
Mountain	Pacolet River Byway		US 176	10.0	16.1	
Mountain	South Mountain Scenery		NC 226	33.0	53.1	
Mountain	Mission Crossing		NC 194	17.0	27.4	
Mountain	Mount Mitchell Scenic Drive		Starting at the I-26 interchange (exit 9), the byway follows US 19 in Madison County and US 19E in Yancey County. In Micaville, it switches onto NC 80 and goes through the Toe River valley. Connecting at the Blue Ridge Parkway, travelers continue south until reaching NC 128, where it makes its final ascent to the top of Mount Mitchell. The byway features mountain scenic vistas and local culture experience in Celo and Burnsville.	52.0	83.7	
Mountain	Little Parkway		US 221	18.0	29.0	
Mountain	New River Valley Byway		NC 88 / NC 194	35.0	56.3	
Mountain	I-26 Scenic Highway		The byway traverses between Tennessee state line and Exit 9 (US 19/US 23A), near Mars Hill, along I-26/US 23. The byway is known for its unspoiled views of the North Carolina Mountains.	9.0	14.5	
Mountain	U.S. 421 Scenic Byway		Follows US 221 and US 421 from the Blue Ridge Parkway, in Deep Gap, to the South Fork New River, near Boone. The byway features panoramic views of Snake Mountain and Elk Knob, as well as the forests, horse/cattle farms, and Fraser Fir Christmas Tree farms.	8.0	12.9	
Mountain	Pisgah Loop Scenic Byway		The loop byway traverses along NC 181, NC 183, Old NC Highway 105 (SR 1238), NC 126 and Fish Hatchery Road (SR 1254/SR 1240). The byway is noted its history as the same route the Kirk's Raiders used to make a successful attack on Confederate Army Camp Vance, outside Morganton, during the Civil War. It is also noted for scenic views of the surrounding mountains and access to various trails along the route. Four-wheel drive is recommended for unpaved portions of the loop.	47.0	75.6	
Mountain	Upper Yadkin Way		The byway traverses along NC 268 between US 321 and W.Kerr Scott Reservoir, in an area known as Happy Valley. Near Ferguson is the grave of Tom Dula, remembered in the folk song "Tom Dooley."	25.0	40.2	
Mountain	Yadkin Valley Scenic Byway		The byway connects various vineyards and wineries in the area, starting from downtown Elkin and making a loop along US 21, Swan Creek Road, Old US 421, Rockford Road, Zephyr Road and Springs Road.	65.0	104.6	
Piedmont	McAuley Road Scenic Byway		Protected along lands controlled by the Catawba Lands Conservancy, the road provides one of the last vestiges of rural vistas of what once dominated Mecklenburg County till the mid-20th century.	1.5	2.4	
Piedmont	Hanging Rock Scenic Byway		NC 66 / NC 89	38.0	61.2	
Piedmont	Clayton Bypass Scenic Byway		The byway is located along Interstate 42, between I-40 and US 70 Bus. It features rolling hills and open pastures peppered with woodlands.	10.7	17.2	
Piedmont	Colonial Heritage Byway		US 70 Bus. / NC 57 / NC 62 / NC 86 / NC 150 / NC 751	92.0	148.1	
Piedmont	Football Road			37.0	59.5	
Piedmont	Crowders Mountain Drive		NC 161	8.0	12.9	
Piedmont	Mill Bridge Scenic Byway		NC 150	14.0	22.5	
Piedmont	Uwharrie Scenic Road		NC 49	50.0	80.5	
Piedmont	Rolling Kansas Byway			9.0	14.5	
Piedmont	Pee Dee Valley Drive		NC 24 / NC 27 / NC 73	14.0	22.5	
Piedmont	Grassy Island Crossing		NC 109	26.0	41.8	
Piedmont	Sandhills Scenic Drive		NC 24 / NC 27 / NC 73	46.0	74.0	
Piedmont	Birkhead Wilderness Route			14.0	22.5	
Piedmont	Flint Hill Ramble			5.0	8.0	
Piedmont	Indian Heritage Trail		US 220 / NC 73	18.0	29.0	
Piedmont	Pottery Road		Located along NC 705, between Eagle Springs and Seagrove. The byway traverses through an area where seven families from Staffordshire, the pottery center of England, settled. Their descendants continue to make both traditional and modern pottery forms and nearly 80 potteries can be found in the vicinity of the byway.	43.0	69.2	
Piedmont	Devil's Stompin' Ground Road		NC 902	43.0	69.2	
Piedmont	North Durham Country Byway			27.0	43.5	
Piedmont	Averasboro Battlefield Scenic Byway		NC 82	4.7	7.6	
Piedmont	Scots-Welsh Heritage Byway		The byway traverses along historic trade roads used by American Indians and early backcountry pioneers. The King of England gave much of the land along this byway to 18th century Scotch-Welsh settlers; much of the land surrounding this byway still used today for farming by those same decedents. Access to the byway is via I-40 at Exit 261 (Hillsborough) and onto Old NC 86. Following south on Old NC 86, cross over New Hope Creek and turn right onto Arthur Minnis Road (SR 1129), continue until Orange Grove Road (SR 1006) and take left, take left onto Dairyland Road (SR 1104), then left again onto Rocky Ridge Road. Once returning to Arthor Minnis Road and left back onto Old NC 86, the byway ends.	10.0	16.1	
Coastal Plain	Blue-Gray Scenic Byway		NC 58	82.0	132.0	
Coastal Plain	Meteor Lakes Byway		NC 242	39.0	62.8	
Coastal Plain	Green Swamp Byway		NC 211	53.0	85.3	
Coastal Plain	Brunswick Town Road		The byway begins at the intersection of NC 133 and Plantation Road (SR 1529), near Southport, and follows Plantation Road to Tryon Palace Road (SR 1533) and follow it to Brunswick Town State Historic Site. This byway showcases historical Brunswick County.	3.0	4.8	
Coastal Plain	Cape Fear Historic Byway		Located in downtown Wilmington, it features scenic urban areas, colonial-era streets, the U.S.S. North Carolina, and the city parks. The following roads and highways that makeup this byway are: US 17, US 17 Bus., US 421, Third Street, Water Street, Front Street, Castle Street, Fifth Street and Lake Shore Drive.	8.0	12.9	
Coastal Plain	Lafayette's Tour		US 13 / US 158 / US 258 / NC 43 / NC 58 / NC 125 / NC 137 / NC 561 / NC 903	173.0	278.4	
Coastal Plain	Tar Heel Trace		NC 42 / NC 124 / NC 125 / NC 142	53.0	85.3	
Coastal Plain	Edenton-Windsor Loop		US 13 / US 17 / US 13 Bus. / NC 32 / NC 45 / NC 308	87.0	140.0	
Coastal Plain	Perquimans Crossing		US 17 Bus. / NC 37	3.0	4.8	
Coastal Plain	Pamlico Scenic Byway		US 264 / NC 32 / NC 45 / NC 92 / NC 99	127.0	204.4	
Coastal Plain	Alligator River Route		The byway follows NC 94 north, from New Holland to Columbia, where it goes east along US 64 Bus. and US 64 to Manns Harbor and Roanoke Island. The byway features expansive wetlands, open farmlands, Alligator River National Wildlife Refuge and Lake Mattamuskeet.	71.0	114.3	
Coastal Plain	Roanoke Voyages Corridor		The byway follows US 64 through Roanoke Island. It features Fort Raleigh National Historic Site (site of the first English settlement in North America), the North Carolina Aquarium, and Roanoke Island Festival Park.	9.0	14.5	

== Other scenic byways and roads ==
Region	Name	Image	Description	mi	km	References
Mountain	Lakeview Drive		Also known as the "Road to Nowhere," this Great Smoky Mountains National Park road follows along the north shore of the Tuckasegee River and provides unspoiled views of the Cheoah Mountains and access to various hiking and riding trails.	6.5	10.5	
Mountain	Mountain Waters Scenic Byway		This National Forest Scenic Byway traverses through the Nantahala National Forest, along US 64, Old Murphy Road (SR 1442), Wayah Road (SR 1310), US 19/US 74 and NC 28. The byway features two river gorges, hardwood forests and countryside vistas.	64.5	103.8	
Coastal Plain	Historic Albemarle Tour		A tour route that encompasses 16 highway in northeastern North Carolina, with signage along routes identifying points of historical interest.			

== See also ==
- National Forest Scenic Byway
- National Scenic Byway
