= North Carolina Highway 147 =

State highway in North Carolina, US

North Carolina Highway 147
- Durham Freeway
- NC 147 highlighted in red

Route information
- Maintained by NCDOT
- Length: 8.1 mi (13.0 km)
- Existed: 1986–present

Major junctions
- South end: I-885 in Durham
- NC 55 in Durham; US 15 / US 501 in Durham
- North end: I-85 / US 70 in Durham

Location
- Country: United States
- State: North Carolina
- Counties: Durham

Highway system
- North Carolina Highway System; Interstate; US; State; Scenic
← NC 146	→ NC 148

North Carolina Highway 147 (NC 147) is a primary state highway in the U.S. state of North Carolina. The highway is an 8.1-mile-long (13.0 km) freeway through Durham running roughly southeast to northwest; the entire route lies within the city limits. To the southeast, it connects the city to the Research Triangle Park. NC 147 is the northern half of the Durham Freeway, which continues south onto Interstate 885 (I-885). The route is the main arterial through Durham, running alongside its downtown. It begins at a semi-directional T interchange with I-885 southeast of downtown Durham and runs northwest–southeast before merging into I-85 northwest of downtown Durham.

Prior to June 30, 2022, both the southern half of the Durham Freeway, along with the northernmost segment of the Triangle Expressway, were part of NC 147. When the East End Connector and related road improvement projects were completed, the former became part of I-885, and the latter became NC 885.

== Route description ==
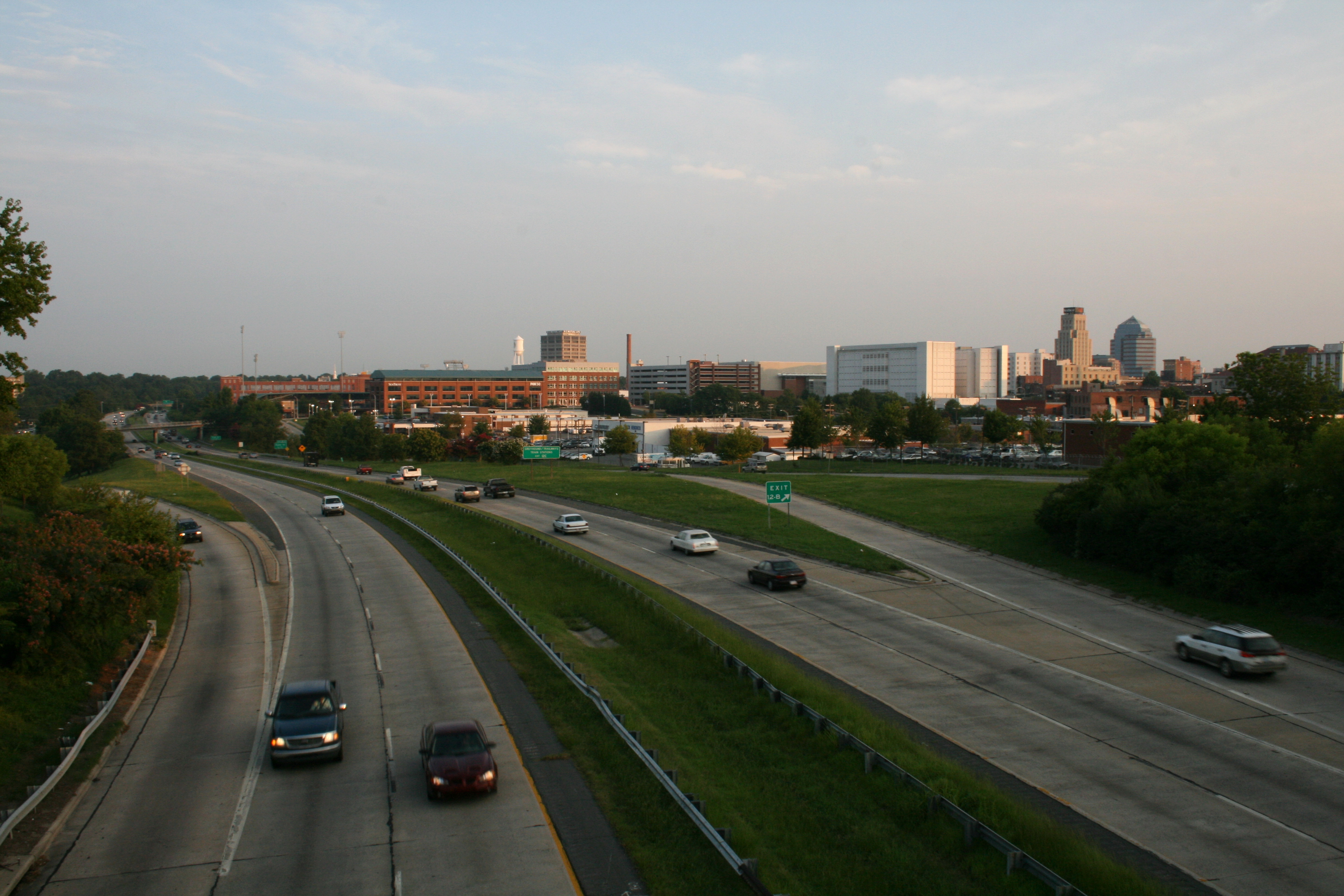
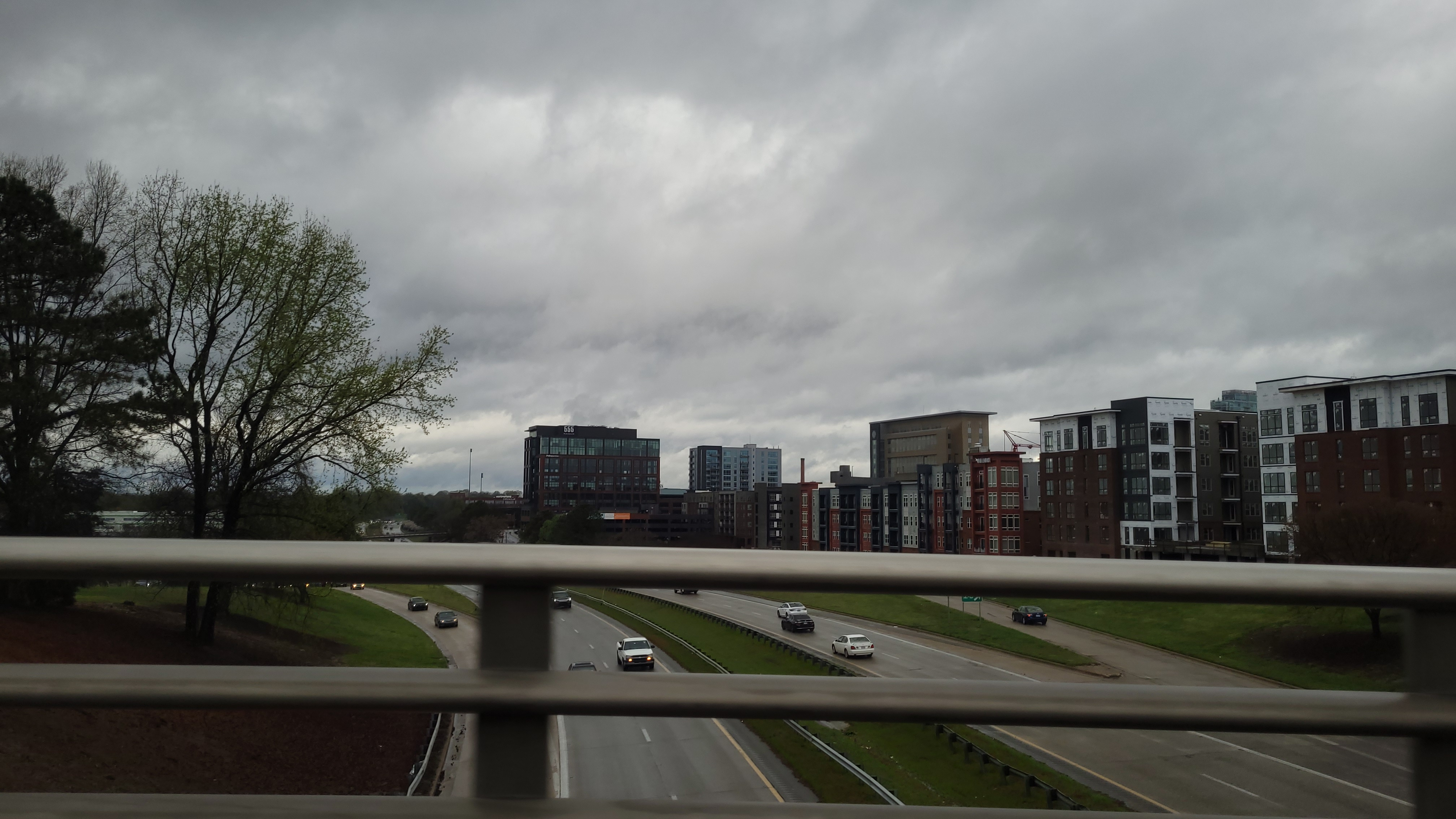
NC 147 winding around downtown Durham in 2008 (top) and 2022 (bottom)

The route's entire length is a limited access freeway, linking I-885 with Downtown Durham, U.S. Routes 15 and 501, and Interstate 85. It is a fairly urbanized commuter-route and suffers from peak-traffic during conventional rush hours. The speed limit on the freeway is 55 mph (89 km/h).

The route forms the northern half of the Durham Freeway, and serves as the primary artery through Downtown Durham. The Durham Freeway portion was originally envisioned as an alignment of I-40, though the interstate was built to the south of the city center instead. The Durham Freeway received the NC 147 designation in 1986. The road follows a southeast–northwest alignment, following a depressed road cut to the south of Downtown Durham, with interchanges to several important Durham streets and arterial roads. It passes close by several major landmarks including the Durham Bulls Athletic Park (visible to the north of the roadway), the Durham Performing Arts Center, and the American Tobacco Historic District. Past Downtown Durham, the freeway passes through Duke University, forming the boundary between East Campus and Central Campus.

Past Duke University, the road reaches its northern terminus in a complex interchange with the U.S. 15-501 Freeway and I-85. Motorists must use U.S. 15-501 for access between I-85 south and NC 147 south, or between NC 147 north and I-85 north. At the actual northern terminus, traffic on NC 147 north merges with I-85 south, while I-85 north traffic can enter NC 147 south using exit 172.

=== Dedicated and memorial names ===
NC 147 features one dedicated stretch of freeway. The Buck Dean Expressway is the official name of NC 147 within the city limits of Durham that was approved on December 14, 1984.

== History ==
The Durham Freeway began with a 1962 bond referendum. The first section of the road, completed in 1970 around downtown Durham, extended from Chapel Hill Street to Alston Avenue and resulted in the destruction of a portion of the Hayti neighborhood as part of urban renewal, though a DOT engineer said the neighborhood likely would have been torn down anyway. The road was later extended west to Erwin Road and southward to where it meets I-40. In 1986, The freeway was designated as North Carolina Highway 147. The road's other names have included East-West Expressway and the I.L. "Buck" Dean Freeway.

In 1979, planners said many of the city's roads needed widening, and the decision was made to extend the freeway to I-85. The first section in 1982 disrupted the Crest Street neighborhood, but the North Carolina Department of Transportation (NCDOT) moved 181 houses instead of tearing them down, an action that resulted in a 1987 third-place Federal Highway Administration (FHWA) award for "historic preservation and cultural enhancement". Eventually, the problems that caused the original I-40 extension to I-85 to be delayed were overcome, and NC 147 was extended through the city. Work began in 1993, and the eastbound lanes opened May 21, 1997. The section connecting the road to I-85 opened July 31, 1998.

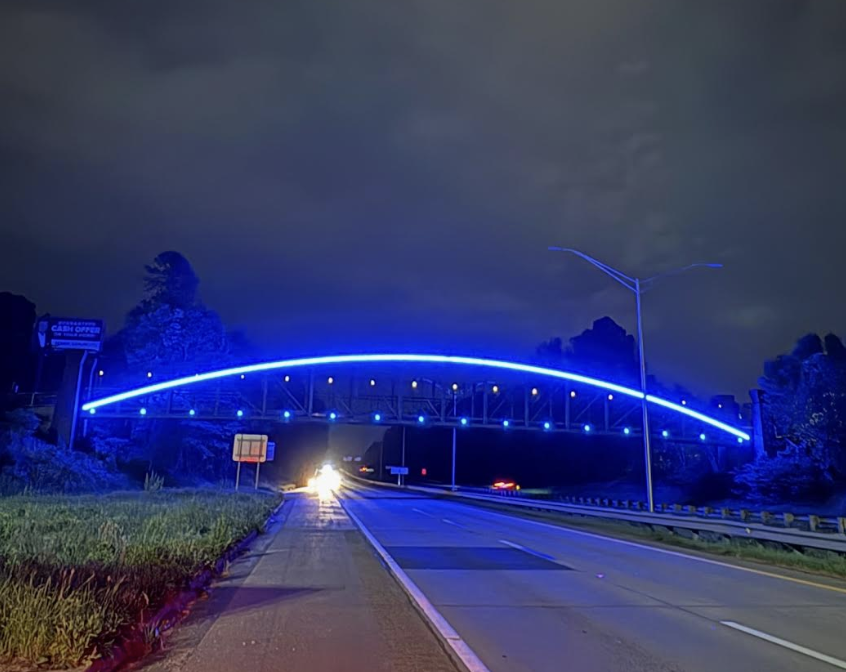
NC Highway 147 passing under the R. Kelly Bryant Jr. Pedestrian Bridge

On September 16, 2010, the R. Kelly Bryant Jr. Pedestrian Bridge was officially opened, crossing over the freeway to connect Hayti with East Durham.

On September 6, 2011, the south terminus at T.W. Alexander Drive (exit 4) was permanently closed to make way for NC 147's extension to NC 540 in Morrisville; this made I-40 the temporary southern terminus for three months. On December 8, 2011, the southern extension was opened. Dubbed the Triangle Parkway, the 3.4-mile (5.5 km) stretch of road is also part of the Triangle Expressway.

Despite the spur to T.W. Alexander Drive being permanently closed, the pavement was never removed, and the abandoned section still sits just south of NC 147's interchange with I-40. The road markings are also visible.

On August 19, 2014, Interstate 885 first appeared in the October project letting for the East End Connector, which included new sign plans. The new designation was originally going to overlap with NC 147 between I-40 and the East End Connector, but it was later decided to decommission NC 147 from NC 540 to the East End Connector instead. On June 30, 2022, NC 147 was replaced by NC 885 along the Triangle Expressway portion and by I-885 between I-40 and the East End Connector.

== Junction list ==
The entire route is in Durham, Durham County.

mi	km	Old exit	New exit	Destinations	Notes
0.0	0.0	—	—	I-885 south – RDU Airport	Continuation as I-885
0.4	0.64	—	1A	I-885 north to I-85 / US 70 – Henderson, Greensboro, Petersburg	
0.9	1.4	10	1B-C	Briggs Avenue – Durham Technical Community College	Signed exit 1 northbound
1.9	3.1	11	2	NC 55 (Alston Avenue)	
2.4	3.9	12A	3A	Fayetteville Street – North Carolina Central University	
2.6	4.2	12B	3B	US 15 Bus. / US 501 Bus. (Mangum Street/Roxboro Street) – Downtown	To Durham Bulls Athletic Park
3.2	5.1	12C	3C	Duke Street	No southbound exit;to North Carolina Museum of Life and Science
3.7	6.0	13	4A	Chapel Hill Street	
4.2	6.8	14	4B	To US 70 Bus. / Swift Avenue – Duke University East Campus	To North Carolina School of Science and Mathematics and Northgate Mall
4.9	7.9	15A	5	Elba Street / Trent Drive	Northbound exit, southbound entrance; to Duke Medical Center
5.3	8.5	15B	6	Hillandale Road / Fulton Street	To Veterans Affairs Medical Center
6.2	10.0	16	7	US 15 / US 501 to I-85 north – Chapel Hill, Duke University West Campus	Signed as exits 7A (north) and 7B (south)
8.1	13.0	—	—	I-85 south – Greensboro	Continuation as I-85
1.000 mi = 1.609 km; 1.000 km = 0.621 mi: Incomplete access
