= North Carolina Highway 55 =

State highway in North Carolina, US

North Carolina Highway 55

- Route of NC 55 highlighted in red

Route information
- Maintained by NCDOT
- Length: 193.0 mi (310.6 km)
- Existed: 1957–present

Major junctions
- West end: US 501 Bus. in Durham
- I-85 / US 15 / US 70 in Durham; I-40 in Durham; NC 147 in Durham; NC 540 Toll in Morrisville; US 1 / US 64 in Apex; I-95 in Dunn; I-40 near Newton Grove; US 13 / US 701 in Newton Grove; Future I-795 / US 117 in Mount Olive; US 17 / US 70 in New Bern
- East end: Oriental Road in Oriental

Location
- Country: United States
- State: North Carolina
- Counties: Durham, Wake, Harnett, Sampson, Johnston, Wayne, Lenoir, Craven, Pamilico

Highway system
- North Carolina Highway System; Interstate; US; State; Scenic
← NC 54	→ NC 56

North Carolina Highway 55 (NC 55) is a primary state highway in the U.S. state of North Carolina. It serves as a traffic artery connecting Durham with Cary and numerous small cities and towns in The Triangle on its way toward the Pamlico Sound. A portion of NC 55 extends through Research Triangle Park. NC 55 is a major artery in the central part of The Triangle region, and is a four lane, divided highway between Durham and Cary and Apex. NC 55 is also a divided highway between Apex and Fuquay-Varina.

== Route description ==
Although NC 55 is signed east–west, the route itself is more L-shaped. Between Durham and Erwin, the eastbound direction physically heads south and westbound is physically north. After Erwin to its eastern terminus, the route follows a more directly eastward routing.

The western terminus is at US 501 Business (North Roxboro Street) just north of I-85. Here the road is locally known as Avondale Dr. Eastbound NC 55 heads south through Durham, leaving Avondale Dr. on a short connector road to join North Alston Ave. NC 55 stays on Alston Avenue, crossing NC 147 (Durham Freeway) and passing North Carolina Central University. After NC Central, the NC 55 leaves Alston Avenue. Locally it is signed south of this point as just "NC 55" but it carries a secondary designation as Apex Highway. As it passes through the western side of Research Triangle Park, it crosses first I-40, then NC 54, and the toll NC 540 as it leaves Durham County and enters Wake County.

Passing near the center of the unincorporated village of Carpenter, eastbound NC 55 goes southbound along the western edges of Morrisville and Cary. In Apex, it crosses US 64 near the large Beaver Creek Shopping center, and goes south of downtown Apex along Williams Street. Leaving Apex southbound, the road crosses US 1 before it splits into a business route (the original highway) and bypass route around the town of Holly Springs (as of October 3, 2019, NC 55 is officially routed along the Bypass route, the NC 55 route through town is now designated as SR 6107). Extensive reconstruction of the roadway in this area, widened in anticipation of higher traffic volumes from NC 540 and construction in Apex and Cary, was completed in 2007. NC 55 is a major highway in western Wake County and is a direct link connecting the Triangle cities of Durham and Cary via the Research Triangle Park. Next, NC 55 enters the town of Fuquay-Varina, forming the main road through the Varina Commercial Historic District. After Varina, the highway joins NC 42 and US 401 as a three way concurrency crossing the north side of Fuquay, with eastbound NC 55 heading east through this area, before splitting off at the eastern edge of the town at the "Five Points" junction. Here, eastbound NC 55 goes due south through the unincorporated community of Kennebec leaving Wake County.

Entering Harnett County, eastbound NC 55 still continues in a primarily south/southeast direction, forming the main north–south routes through the center of the towns of Angier and Coats. Between Angier and Coats, traffic heading for Buies Creek and Campbell University would leave NC 55 at either Oak Grove Church Road or NC 27. Southeast of Coats, NC 55 passes through the sparsely populated unincorporated community of Turlington before joining US 421 and entering the town of Erwin. While the roadway that carries NC 55 continues through Erwin as NC 217, NC 55 itself joins US 421. The two highways cross into the city of Dunn together; shortly after a junction with I-95, NC 55 leaves US 421 and enters Sampson County. From the joining US 421 in Erwin, the eastbound route to its eastern terminus now follows a more directly eastern route.

NC 55 roughly follows the northern boundary of Sampson County, crossing several times between Sampson and Johnston County, joining NC 50 as the main east–west route through the town of Newton Grove. NC 55/NC 50 split at the border of Wayne County, with NC 55 heading eastward past the northern edge of the college town of Mount Olive, also known for the Mount Olive Pickle Company. NC 55 passes through the town of Seven Springs before turning to the northeast to enter the city of Kinston in Lenoir County.

East of Kinston, NC 55 takes a winding path, roughly following the Neuse River to its mouth at New Bern, crossing at the Neuse and Trent rivers along a bridge concurrent with US 17 and US 70. East of New Bern, NC 55 forms the main east–west route through Pamlico County, passing through several small towns including the county seat of Bayboro. East of Bayboro, the road curves to the southeast and south before ending at the Pamlico Sound in Oriental.

== History ==
NC 55 was first routed from NC 50 and US 1 (current US 1A) in Franklinton to Durham. In 1930 maps showed that NC 91 had replaced NC 55 route from Franklinton to Durham and instead NC 55 took the place of NC 13 north of Durham to the Virginia state line. In 1932 NC 55 was extended south through Apex and Holly Springs. The road then turned east to go to US 401 and NC 21 in Cardenas. NC 55 then replaced NC 210 through Angier and Erwin. It then ended at US 301 and NC 22 in Godwin. In 1934 NC 55 was removed from its routing north of Durham and US 501 got the route. At the same time that year NC 55 was routed east along US 421 from Erwin to Dunn then as a new primary route to Newton Grove (near present-day I-40). Then it would replace US 117 through Mount Olive and Kinston and then ended at US 70 in Jasper. The route from Erwin to Godwin became NC 82. In 1938, NC 55 was rerouted further east through Tuscarora and ended at US 70 in Clark. In 1940, NC 55 was rerouted from Mount Olive to Seven Springs which is its current routing. Also that year NC 55 was routed from Jasper to New Bern then crossed the Neuse River along with US 17. The same year was extended along NC 302 from Bridgetown to Oriental. NC 302 was dissolved. In 1941 US 70 and NC 55 "swapped" routes from Kinston to Clarks. In 1948, NC 55 was rerouted along new primary routing to avoid an overlap with US 64. The old route became NC 751. Between the years of 1958 and 1962, NC 55 was rerouted along the north side of Mount Olive.

=== North Carolina Highway 117 ===
North Carolina Highway 117
- Location: Newton Grove–Jasper
- Length: 114.7 mi (184.6 km)
- Existed: 1931–1934

North Carolina Highway 117 (NC 117) was established in 1931 as a new primary spur from US 70/NC 10, in Jasper, to Dover. In 1932, NC 117 was extended west on new routing through Kinston and Mount Olive, before ending at NC 102, in Newton Grove. In 1934, NC 117 was decommissioned in favor of NC 55 extension.

=== North Carolina Highway 302 ===
North Carolina Highway 302
- Location: Bridgeton–Oriental
- Length: 25.9 mi (41.7 km)
- Existed: 1921–1940

North Carolina Highway 302 (NC 302) was an original state highway that traversed from NC 30, in Bridgeton, east to Bayboro. In 1922, it was extended east to Oriental. In 1940, NC 302 was renumbered as NC 55.

== Major intersections ==
County	Location	mi	km	Destinations	Notes
Durham	Durham	0.0	0.0	US 501 Bus. (Roxboro Street)	Western terminus
Durham	Durham	0.2	0.32	I-85 / US 15 / US 70 – Hillsborough, Chapel Hill, Oxford, Raleigh	Diamond interchange; exit 177 on I-85
Durham	Durham	1.7	2.7	US 70 Bus. / NC 98 (Holloway Street) – Wake Forest, Youngsville	
Durham	Durham	2.5	4.0	NC 147 (East-West Expressway) – Morrisville	Diamond interchange
Durham	Durham	7.8	12.6	I-40 (John Motley Morehead III Freeway) – Greensboro, Wilmington	Partial cloverleaf interchange; exit 278 on I-40
Durham	Durham	8.2	13.2	NC 54 (Nelson Chapel Hill Highway) – Chapel Hill, Raleigh	
Wake	Morrisville	12.8	20.6	NC 540 Toll (Triangle Expressway) to I-540 – Raleigh	Exit 66A-B on NC 540
Wake	Apex	19.4	31.2	US 64 – Pittsboro, Cary	Partial cloverleaf interchange
Wake	Apex	22.5	36.2	US 1 (Claude E. Pope Memorial Highway) – Moncure, Wake Forest	Diamond interchange
Wake	Apex	24.0	38.6	NC 540 Toll – Triangle Expressway	Exits 54A–B on NC 540
Wake	Fuquay-Varina	32.5	52.3	US 401 south / NC 42 west (Main Street) – Lillington, Sanford	West end of concurrency with US 401 and NC 42
Wake	Fuquay-Varina	34.5	55.5	US 401 north (Main Street) – Garner, Raleigh	East end of concurrency with US 401
Wake	Fuquay-Varina	34.6	55.7	NC 42 east – Clayton, Wilson	East end of concurrency with NC 42
Harnett	Angier	40.9	65.8	NC 210 (Depot Street) – Lillington, Smithfield	
Harnett	Coats	48.9	78.7	NC 27 (Stewart Street) – Lillington, Benson	
Harnett	Erwin	54.4	87.5	US 421 north (Jackson Boulevard) / NC 82 east (13th Street) – Sanford, Godwin	West end of concurrency with US 421; western terminus of NC 82
Harnett	Dunn	58.8	94.6	US 301 (Clinton Avenue) – Eastover, Benson	
Harnett	Dunn	59.5	95.8	I-95 – Fayetteville, Rocky Mount	Diamond interchange; exit 73 on I-95
Harnett	Dunn	59.7	96.1	US 421 south (Cumberland Street) – Clinton	East end of concurrency with US 421
Sampson		66.5	107.0	NC 242 (Benson Highway) – Salemburg, Benson	
Johnston	No major junctions				
Sampson	Newton Grove	69.0	111.0	NC 96 north – Selma	Southern terminus of NC 96
Sampson	Newton Grove	73.1	117.6	NC 50 north (Johnston Highway) – Benson	West end of concurrency with NC 50
Sampson	Newton Grove	73.3	118.0	I-40 – Raleigh, Wilmington	Diamond interchange; exit 341 on I-40
Sampson	Newton Grove	74.6	120.1	US 13 (Fayetteville Highway) / US 701 (Clinton and Main streets) – Eastover, Goldsboro, Clinton, Four Oaks	Six-way intersection with a traffic roundabout
Sampson		81.4	131.0	NC 50 south (Julius Sutton Highway) – Faison	East end of concurrency with NC 50
Wayne	Mount Olive	92.0	148.1	US 117 – Calypso, Goldsboro	Diamond interchange
Wayne	Mount Olive	92.3	148.5	US 117 Alt. (Breazeale Avenue)	
Wayne	Williams	97.9	157.6	NC 403 west (Williams X Road) – Faison	Eastern terminus of NC 403
Wayne	Hines Crossroads	103.0	165.8	NC 111 – Beulaville, Goldsboro	
Lenoir		107.7	173.3	NC 903 – Kenansville, La Grange	
Lenoir	Parrott Fork	118.5	190.7	NC 11 south – Pink Hill	West end of concurrency with NC 11
Lenoir	Kinston	122.0	196.3	US 70 / US 258 (New Bern Road) – La Grange, Snow Hill, New Bern, Richlands	
Lenoir	Kinston	123.3	198.4	US 70 / US 258 / NC 58 (Queen Street) – Cape Carteret, Snow Hill	
Lenoir		127.1	204.5	NC 11 north – Grifton	East end of concurrency with NC 11
Craven	New Bern	158.6	255.2	NC 43 (Washington Post Road) – Vanceboro, Greenville	
Craven	New Bern	162.0	260.7	US 70 Bus. west (Dr. Martin Luther King Jr. Boulevard)	West end of concurrency with US 70 Bus.
Craven	New Bern	162.5	261.5	US 70 Bus. east (Broad Street)	East end of concurrency with Business US 70
Craven	New Bern	163.3	262.8	US 17 south / US 70 west – Dover, Pollocksville	West end of concurrency with US 17/US 70; partial diamond interchange
Craven	James City	164.2	264.3	US 70 east / US 70 Bus. west – Havelock	East end of concurrency with US 70; eastern terminus of Business US 70; partial cloverleaf interchange
Craven	Bridgeton	167.2	269.1	US 17 north (D Street) – Vanceboro	East end of concurrency with US 17
Pamlico	Grantsboro	178.0	286.5	NC 306 (Point Road) – Arapahoe, Aurora	
Pamlico	Bayboro	182.2	293.2	NC 304 east (Vandemere Road) – Vandemere	Southern terminus of NC 304
Pamlico	Oriental	193.0	310.6	Oriental Road	Eastern terminus
1.000 mi = 1.609 km; 1.000 km = 0.621 mi: Concurrency terminus; Tolled

== Special routes ==
=== Former Holly Springs Bypass ===
North Carolina Highway 55 Bypass
- Location: Holly Springs, North Carolina
- Length: 4.4 mi (7.1 km)
- Existed: 2002–2019

North Carolina Highway 55 Bypass (NC 55 By-pass) was established in 2002 as a new primary route that bypassed north of Holly Springs. Usually, the old alignment would become a business loop, but instead the NC 55 mainline remained unchanged. The bypass was built as an expressway, that is semi-controlled and has superstreet intersections; it also has a full interchange with NC 540. On October 3, 2019, NCDOT officially placed NC 55 on the Bypass, the route through the city was designated as SR 6107.

=== Bridgeton alternate spur ===
North Carolina Highway 55A
- Location: Bridgeton, North Carolina
- Length: 0.15 mi (240 m)
- Existed: 1953–1962

North Carolina Highway 55 Alternate (NC 55A) was established around 1950–1953 as a renumbering of a piece of mainline NC 55 in Bridgeton. It was created thanks to a new bridge carrying US 17/NC 55 over the Neuse River and a spur was needed to be made to connect each highway. Between 1958 and 1962, this short road was downgraded to a secondary road; today it no longer exists.

== See also ==
- North Carolina Bicycle Route 3 – concurrent with NC 55 from Old US 70 west of New Bern to SR 1600 east of Bridgeton
- North Carolina Bicycle Route 5 – concurrent with NC 55 in Angier
- North Carolina Bicycle Route 7 – concurrent with NC 55 from Old US 70 west of New Bern to Reelsboro
- Hwy 55 Burgers Shakes & Fries – restaurant chain named for the highway
