= Triangle Expressway =

Highway in North Carolina, United States

Triangle Expressway
- Triangle Parkway; Western Wake Expressway; Southern Wake Expressway
- Triangle Expressway highlighted in red

Route information
- Maintained by NCDOT
- Length: 32.4 mi (52.1 km)
- Existed: 2011–present
- Component highways: NC 540 from Garner to Morrisville; NC 885 from Morrisville to RTP

Major junctions
- East end: I-40 / I-42 near Garner
- US 401 near Garner; NC 55 in Apex; US 1 near Apex; US 64 in Apex; NC 540 in Morrisville
- North end: I-40 / I-885 in RTP

Location
- Country: United States
- State: North Carolina
- Counties: Durham, Wake

Highway system
- North Carolina Highway System; Interstate; US; State; Scenic

The Triangle Expressway (TriEx) is the first modern toll road built in North Carolina, and one of the first toll roads in the United States built to use only electronic toll collection instead of toll booths. The overall freeway consists of three segments called the Triangle Parkway, the Western Wake Expressway, and the Southern Wake Expressway, totalling up to 32.4 miles (52.1 km) long. The six-lane Triangle Parkway extends Interstate 885 (I-885) 3.5 miles (5.6 km) via North Carolina Highway 885 (NC 885) in Durham County to meet North Carolina Highway 540 (NC 540) in Morrisville in Wake County. The Western Wake Expressway extends 12.4 miles (20.0 km) long, extending NC 540 to meet NC 55 in Apex. The Southern Wake Expressway extends 16.5 miles (26.6 km) long, extending NC 540 to meet I-40 and I-42 southeast of Garner.

== Description of the project ==
The money for the project comes from $625 million in bonds and a $387 million loan from the federal government. The North Carolina Turnpike Authority deposited this money on July 29, 2009, and on the same day the agency's executive director David W. Joyner signed contracts to pay $584 million of that money to three companies to build the road over the next 42 months, creating 13,800 jobs.

=== Triangle Parkway ===
S. T. Wooten Corp. of Wilson, North Carolina built the 3.4-mile (5.5 km) northern section, an extension of NC 147, called the Triangle Parkway, at a cost of $137.5 million, including an electronic toll plaza on I-540. The new road opened for traffic on December 8, 2011 and extends from the previously existing section of NC 147 (now I-885) south from I-40 to an 2.8-mile (4.5 km) section of the Northern Wake Expressway. Completed in 2007, the existing section became part of the toll road on August 2, 2012. Originally envisioned as part of I-540, because of rules against tolls on Interstate Highways, this section is now called NC 540. When Research Triangle Park (RTP) was created in the late 1950s, a corridor of land was preserved to be available for the Triangle Parkway's eventual construction. Another $230 million was spent on 525 acres (2.12 km^{2}) of additional right-of-way for the entire road.

Actual tolling of the new section of road began January 3, 2012.

=== Western Wake Freeway ===
Granite Construction of Watsonville, California, and Archer Western Contractors of Atlanta worked together as Raleigh Durham Roadbuilders to complete the 12.6-mile (20.3 km) Western Wake Freeway at a cost of $446.5 million. This section of the Triangle Expressway, which extends from NC 55 at RTP to NC 55 at Holly Springs, will become part of NC 540. In summer 2009, work began on the freeway. On August 1, 2012, the 6.6-mile (10.6 km) second section from NC 55 to US 64 opened, with the remaining six miles south of US 64 to NC 55 in Holly Springs opening December 20, 2012. Tolls and $25 million a year from the North Carolina legislature will finance the project.

== Tolls ==
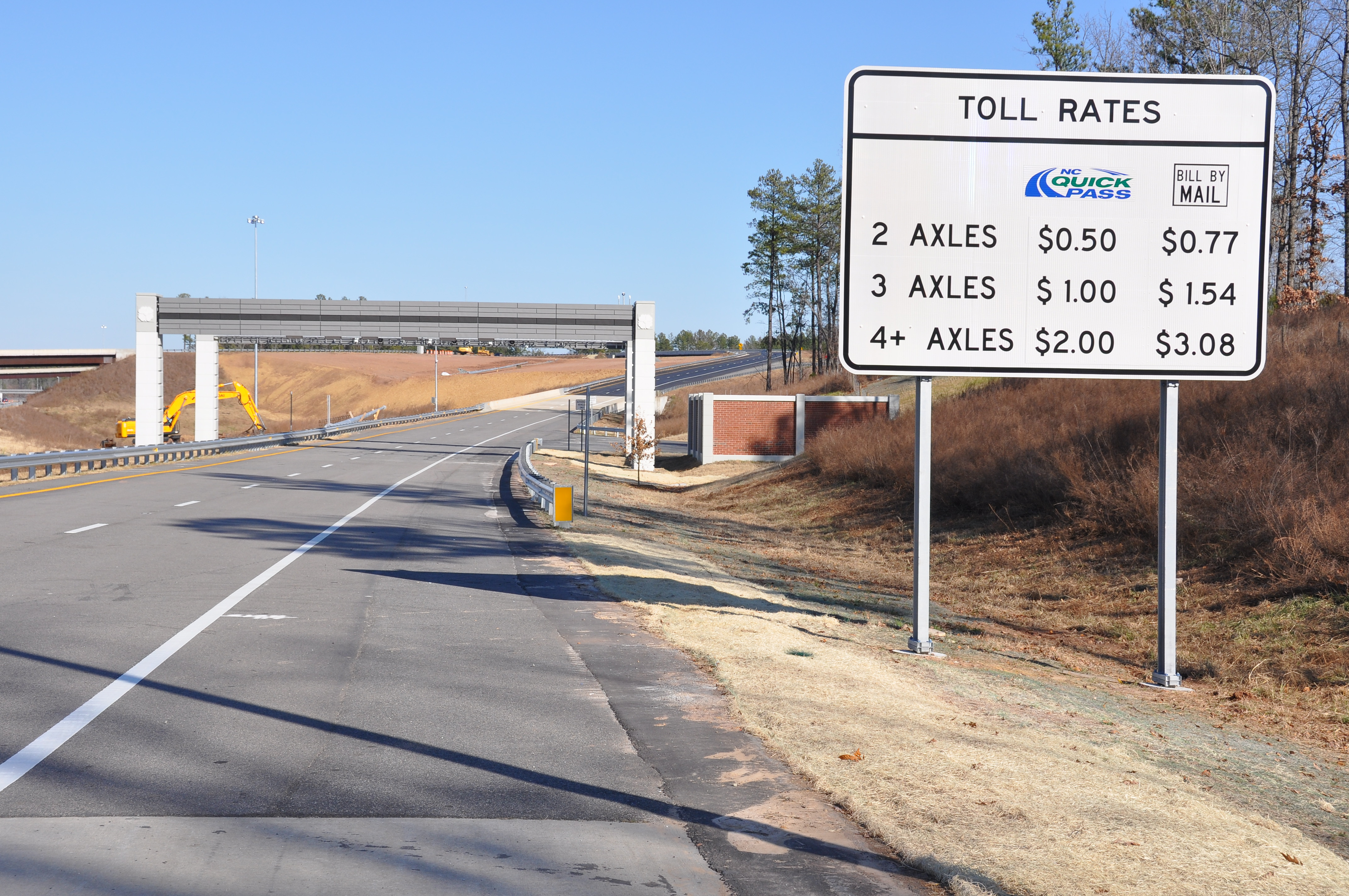
Original toll rates of then NC 147, from NC 540, in 2011

The Triangle Expressway uses open road tolling along its entire length and is operated by the North Carolina Turnpike Authority. Electronic toll gantries are located on the expressway mainline between each interchange so that all motorists will pass through at least one. Tolls payable with a valid transponder (NC Quick Pass, E-ZPass, ExpressToll, K-TAG, Peach Pass, Pikepass, SunPass, or TollTag) or bill by mail, which uses automatic license plate recognition and charge double the posted rate with additional fees.

As of June 2026, the total toll rate for two-axle vehicles on the length of the expressway is $8.50 with valid transponder and $17.00 for bill-by-mail. Three-axle rates are twice the two-axle rates; four-or-more-axle rates are three times the two-axle rates.

== History ==
The "Triangle Parkway" was first proposed in 1958, as part of Research Triangle Park. On February 16, 2005, it was one of four roads selected by the Turnpike Authority to be built as toll roads in North Carolina. The estimated cost was $69 million for 3.2 miles (5.1 km) between Davis Drive and NC 54. An additional $29 million could be spent extending that highway 1.3 miles (2.1 km) to McCrimmon Parkway in Morrisville, whose leaders opposed the idea. The original parkway route, however, had no real opponents.

At the groundbreaking ceremony in 2009, Representative David Price pointed out that using tolls to finance this road "was not our first choice." Instead, area governments concluded the road would have taken 15 more years to complete any other way, so the decision to charge tolls came in 2005. The 12.5-mile (20.1 km) Western Wake Expressway from RTP to Holly Springs had been delayed earlier in the year, and the legislature had increased the number of toll projects allowed from four to nine.

In July 2006, the legislature decided to allow the section of I-540 connecting the Triangle Parkway and Western Wake Expressway to be a toll road if the other two roads were also toll roads, even though the road was already being built.

Federal approval for the use of tolls came in January 2007. The Turnpike Authority asked that the new section of road not be called an Interstate.

Just before the July 2007 opening of the 4.5-mile (7.2 km) I-540 section between I-40 and NC 55, I-540 signs came down, replaced with NC 540 signs. Using the designation NC 540, a decision made in May 2007, was less confusing than giving the road an entirely new number.

The name "Triangle Expressway" became official in May 2007, and turnpike board member Perry R. Safran said the committee also wanted the nickname "TriEx".

On November 14, 2007, the board decided toll booths would not be used, and on June 5, 2008, the State House voted to approve $25 million a year for 39 years for the project. This would cover the difference between expected toll collections and actual costs.

Groundbreaking was held on August 12, 2009 at the west end of Interstate 540 (I-540). "A dozen dignitaries" used shovels painted gold as 150 watched.

On December 8, 2011, the first leg of the Triangle Expressway opened to traffic. Toll collection began January 3, 2012.

On August 1, 2012, the second section of the Triangle Expressway, from Research Triangle Park to U.S. 64, opened. Toll collection began the following day.

On December 20, 2012, the section from U.S. 64 to NC 55 in Holly Springs opened with toll collection beginning in January.

Toll rates change almost annually as required by the bond covenant created for the funding of the Expressway. Since its initial rate set at 2012, it has increased in 2013, 2015 and 2016.

On January 20, 2017, the expressway was chosen as one of 10 testing locations for driverless cars.

On June 30, 2022, Toll NC 147 was re-designated as Toll NC 885 as a part of the opening of the East End Connector Project.

On September 25, 2024, at 6:00 AM EDT, the section from NC 55 in Holly Springs to the I-40/US 70 Interchange in Garner was opened to traffic.

== Future ==
Planned as the next phase of the Triangle Expressway and the final segment of the Raleigh Beltway, the Triangle Expressway Southeast Extension (also known as the Southern and Eastern Wake Freeways) will traverse 30 miles (48 km) linking NC 540 and I-540, just south of Knightdale. Planning for the route started in 2010, but was put on hold in March 2011 by the enactment of North Carolina Session Law 2011-7 (N.C. S.L. 2011-7). This law stated routes to study "shall not be located north of" the Orange Route, shown on maps for 20 years, potentially impacting wetlands and endangered mollusks. The U.S. Army Corps of Engineers opposed the Orange Route unless other potential routes could be found. A map unveiled August 22, 2012 shows the Lilac Route and the Plum Route, which would result in less environmental impact but would cause the loss of more homes. Planners hoped for a final route by 2014. On December 7, 2012, the Federal Highway Administration and the U.S. Army Corps of Engineers replied to NCDOT saying they could not legally evaluate the Orange Route without comparing it to another route expected to cause less environmental harm. Since there was an impasse between the Federal government and the state regarding the issue, the federal funds for the project were cut, putting the Southeast Extension on hiatus.

A Draft Environmental Impact Statement released in late 2015 included 17 options, the Red Route included. Construction west of Interstate 40 would start in 2018 or later. The Lilac Route avoided the environmental problems of the Orange Route but like the Red Route would result in many homes being lost, and the Raleigh water treatment plant would also be affected. The Blue Route and Purple Route to the south of the others would cause the loss of even more homes. East of Interstate 40, there was no preferred route, and all of the options had problems.

In April 2016, NCDOT announced that Detailed Study Alternative was selected as the preferred alternative for the project. The route goes from west to east and combines the proposed orange, green (southern portion), mint, and green (northern portion) corridor segments. The Federal Highway Administration then approved the final environmental impact study for the roadway, which was published in December 2017.

In June 2018, the federal government approved the entire 28.4 mile (45.71 km) extension of NC-540 which would complete the southern loop of NC-540 around Raleigh from the current terminus in Holly Springs to the Interstate 540 terminus in Knightdale; the project was estimated to cost approximately $2.24 billion.

However, in May 2018, a collective of environmental groups represented by Southern Environmental Law Center in Chapel Hill sued NCDOT. They claimed that the U.S. Fish and Wildlife Service did not properly analyze the project's environmental impacts, noting two species of endangered freshwater mussels that could be at risk. This delayed progress until August 2019, when the group agreed to drop the lawsuit in exchange for a number of concessions from NCDOT, including roughly $5 million in spending on "high quality land" within the Neuse and Tar-Pamlico river watersheds, and $4.6 million for studies on the propagation and restoration of endangered freshwater animals.

With this settled, construction began in mid-November 2019. The first portion of NC 540 from NC 55 to I-40 was scheduled to be open to traffic in 2023, but was later pushed out to Spring 2024. After further delays, the extension was set to have its official ribbon-cutting and opening on August 27, 2024. However, Tropical Storm Debby, reportedly, caused significant erosion along the unopened portion of the expressway further delaying the opening to vehicles. NCDOT later announced on September 4, 2024 a revised opening date of September 25, 2024. The extension opened to traffic at 6 a.m. that day.

By August 21, 2021, the final segment closing the loop to I-87/US 64/US 264 was scheduled to begin the bidding process in 2025 with construction not beginning until at least 2029. Public input over the growth and development of a 15,000-acre area of eastern Wake County along the lower Neuse River as well as the future southern loop of NC 540 was requested on June 23, 2023.

The process of completing the final segment was sped up after the N.C. Turnpike Authority (NCTA) was able to get a single environmental permit, allowing for utility work to begin. That coupled with strong local support and expected toll revenues moved the project up NCDOT’s list of priorities and the bidding process for the segment began much earlier than anticipated in Summer 2023. The work was to be done in two sections; the first one would be from south of Rock Quarry Road northward to the I-540/I-87/US 64/US 264 interchange while the second one would be from I-40/US 70 (future I-42) to south of Rock Quarry Road. In September 2023, it was announced that Flatiron-Fred Smith Company Joint Venture had been awarded a $450 million contract to complete the first segment; S.T. Wooten-Branch Civil joint venture was awarded a $287 million contract for the second segment in October 2023. In December 2023, the Local Government Commission (LGC) approved an application by the NCTA for revenue bonds and a Transportation Infrastructure Finance & Innovation Act (TIFIA) loan through US-DOT to start construction. Construction is now expected to start once the southern extension is opened. Completion of the final segment is expected in 2028.

== Exit list ==
County	Location	mi	km	Exit	Destinations	Notes
Wake	Knightdale	0.0	0.0	26	I-87 / US 64 / US 264 (Knightdale Bypass) – Raleigh, Wilson, Rocky Mount	Future interchanges (proposed); estimated completion 2028
Wake	Knightdale	1.8	2.9	27	Poole Road	Future interchanges (proposed); estimated completion 2028
Wake		3.7	6.0	29	Auburn Knightdale Road	Future interchanges (proposed); estimated completion 2028
Wake		6.0	9.7	32	Rock Quarry Road	Future interchanges (proposed); estimated completion 2028
Wake		7.3	11.7	33	US 70	Future interchanges (proposed); estimated completion 2028
Wake		9.2	14.8	35	White Oak Road	Future interchanges (proposed); estimated completion 2028
Johnston		11.1	17.9	36	I-40 / I-42 east – Raleigh, Goldsboro, Wilmington	
Wake		13.5	21.7	39	NC 50 (Benson Road)	
Wake		17.5	28.2	43	Old Stage Road	Westbound exit opened November 22, 2024
Wake		19.6	31.5	45	US 401 (Fayetteville Road) – Fuquay-Varina, Garner	Signed as Fuquay-Varina (west) and Garner (east)
Wake		22.2	35.7	47	Bells Lake Road	Eastbound entrance and exit opened November 27, 2024
Wake	Holly Springs	24.9	40.1	50	Holly Springs Road	
Wake	Apex	27.9	44.9	54	NC 55 – Apex, Holly Springs, Fuquay-Varina	Signed as exits 54A (west) and 54B (east)
Wake	Apex	28.5	45.9	55	Veridea Parkway	
Wake		29.2	47.0	56	US 1 – Raleigh, Sanford	To Harris Lake; signed as exits 56A (north) and 56B (south)
Wake		30.2	48.6	57	South Salem Street	
Wake	Apex	33.0	53.1	59	US 64 – Apex, Pittsboro	To Jordan Lake; signed as exits 59A (east) and 59B (west)
Wake	Cary	35.5	57.1	62	Green Level West Road – Cary	
Wake	Cary	37.2	59.9	64	Morrisville Parkway	
Wake	Cary	40.0	64.4	66	NC 55 – Cary, Durham	To USA Baseball; signed as exits 66A (east) and 66B (west)
Wake	Morrisville	41.8	67.3	67	NC 540 east to I-40 east / I-540 – RDU Airport, Raleigh	NC 885 exit 1
Wake	Morrisville	41.8	67.3	Route transition from NC 540 to NC 885		
Durham	Research Triangle Park	42.5	68.4	2 / 3	Davis Drive / Hopson Road	Signed exit 2 northbound, exit 3 southbound
Durham	Research Triangle Park	44.9	72.3	5	I-40 to NC 54 – Raleigh, Chapel Hill	Signed as exit 5A (east) and 5B (west), continuation as I-885
1.000 mi = 1.609 km; 1.000 km = 0.621 mi: Route transition; Unopened

Note – Exit numbers are based on NC 885 or NC 540.
