= North Carolina Highway 54 =

State highway in North Carolina, US

North Carolina Highway 54

Route information
- Maintained by NCDOT
- Length: 55.0 mi (88.5 km)
- Existed: 1929–present

Major junctions
- West end: US 70 / NC 62 in Burlington
- I-40 / I-85 in Graham; US 15 / US 501 / NC 86 in Chapel Hill; I-40 in Chapel Hill; NC 540 in Morrisville; I-40 near Raleigh
- East end: I-440 / US 1 in Raleigh

Location
- Country: United States
- State: North Carolina
- Counties: Alamance, Orange, Durham, Wake

Highway system
- North Carolina Highway System; Interstate; US; State; Scenic
← NC 53	→ NC 55

North Carolina Highway 54 (NC 54) is a 55.0-mile-long (88.5 km) primary state highway in the U.S. state of North Carolina. The highway serves the Research Triangle area, between Burlington and Raleigh, connecting the cities and towns of Chapel Hill, Durham, Morrisville and Cary. The highway also links the campuses of University of North Carolina at Chapel Hill and North Carolina State University.

NC 54 runs from US 70 in Burlington along Chapel Hill Road through the downtown area of Graham. Turning to the southeast the route runs through some of the outskirts of Burlington before moving through a predominantly rural area. Approaching Chapel Hill, the highway follows the NC 54 "Bypass" around the town and runs concurrently with US 15/US 501 until reaching Raleigh Road. At Raleigh Road, NC 54 continues to the east crossing I-40 and running through the outskirts of Durham. The road parallels I-40 as it enters into Research Triangle Park. From Morrisville, NC 54 follows Chapel Hill Road until reaching the downtown area of Cary where it uses Maynard Road as a bypass. On the eastern side of Cary, NC 54 turns back onto Chapel Hill Road and follows the road until reaching Hillsborough Street near Raleigh. At Hillsborough Street, NC 54 turns to the east to follow the street through west Raleigh and along the NC State Fairgrounds. The highway ends at I-440/US 1 west of downtown Raleigh.

NC 54 first appeared as an original state highway running from NC 75 in Pittsboro to Moncure. However, by 1928 the route was recommissioned as a secondary road which remains today as Moncure Pittsboro Road. The current NC 54 was signed in 1929 from Graham to US 70 south of Durham. In 1930 it was further extended through Rockingham to the Virginia border, however in 1940 much of that routing was renumbered as NC 87. The route was further extended in 1953 where it ran concurrent along US 70A until reaching US 1 in Cary. The Chapel Hill Bypass was completed in 1956 and NC 54 was rerouted from its downtown Chapel Hill routing to the new bypass. The last major change to the routing occurred in 1963 when NC 54 was extended along Hillsborough Street to the then-new US 1 freeway (present day I-440).

== Route description ==
=== Burlington to Chapel Hill ===
NC 54 east begins in western Burlington at the intersection of US 70/NC 62 (Church Street) and Chapel Hill Street. This intersection is a right-in/right-out intersection with US 70 eastbound; access to and from westbound US 70 is provided through South O'Neal Street. NC 54 is also signed along this sub-500-yard (460 m) segment of O'Neal Street.

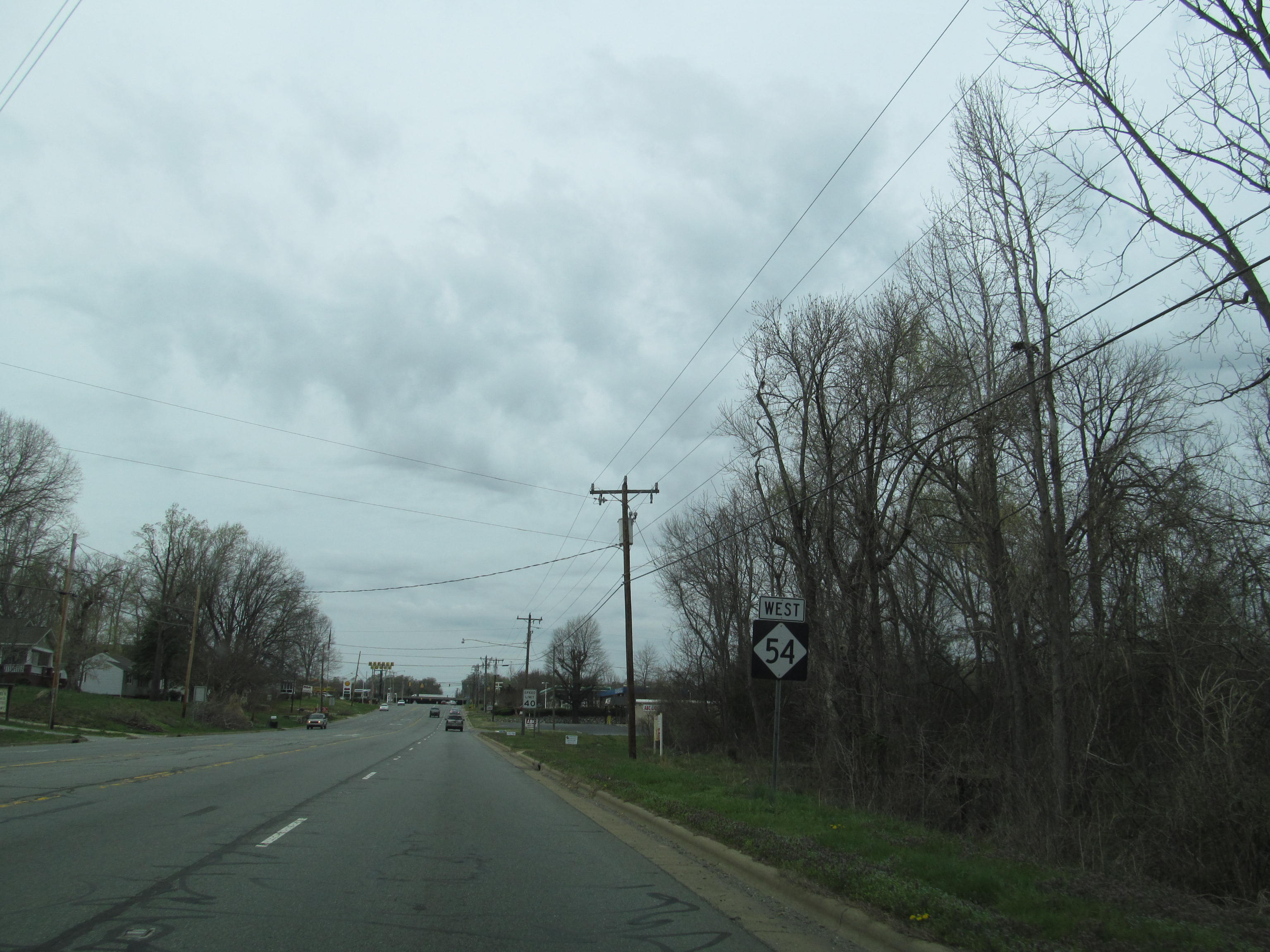
Westbound NC 54 approaching interchange with I-40/I-85 in Graham

NC 54 follows Chapel Hill Road to the intersection of NC 49/NC 100 (Maple Avenue) in downtown Graham. NC 54 joins NC 49 north on Harden Street through downtown. The route roughly parallels I-40 to the south as it enters into the downtown area of Graham. NC 49/NC 54 turns to the northeast before intersecting NC 87 (West Elm Street). After the intersection, the road turns east and follows along a concurrency with NC 49 and NC 87. NC 87 turns off at Main Street in downtown Graham. Three blocks to the east, NC 49 exits at East Elm Street. NC 54 begins its turn southeast and crosses I-40/I-85 at its exit 148. NC 54 remains on Harden Street until it crosses the Haw River and is known from that point solely as NC 54.

After crossing the Haw River, NC 54 remains relatively parallel to the river. The route passes east of Swepsonville, where it also passes by a country club along with a large manufacturing plant. Immediately after passing the plant, the road intersects the southern terminus of NC 119 at an intersection with East Main Street. After the intersection the road turns more toward the east and runs through an area which is primarily rural with multiple neighborhoods surrounding the route. After passing through the unincorporated community of Oaks, the road makes a gradual turn from its southeastern direction towards an eastern direction. Several farms lie adjacent to the road as most of the neighborhoods dissipate. NC 54 finishes its eastern turn as it enters another unincorporated community, White Cross. The route briefly turns northeasterly, then turns back to a gradual southeastern direction after passing by a quarry.

As the road nears Carrboro, several neighborhoods and businesses are found adjacent to the highway. Before intersecting Old Fayetteville Road, the highway begins to widen from a two-lane road, to a four-lane divided highway. The highway passes by a strip mall immediately after passing Old Fayetteville Road, and intersects Main Street before turning to the south. NC 54 follows a limited access highway known as the NC 54 Bypass, along the south side of Carrboro and Chapel Hill. The highway has diamond interchanges at Jones Ferry Road, South Greensboro Street, and South Columbia Street, where NC 86 has its southern terminus and US 15/US 501 joins NC 54. The road becomes Fordham Boulevard, where the highway begins to turn north to head toward Durham.

=== Chapel Hill to Morrisville ===
NC 54 exits east on Raleigh Road on the east side of Chapel Hill. Multiple strip malls and neighborhoods are located adjacent to the route as it heads southeast towards Durham. After passing by a developed area east of Chapel Hill, the route turns east and becomes the Nelson-Chapel Hill Highway, a divided highway connecting Fordham Boulevard and I-40. The route crosses I-40 at a partial cloverleaf interchange. After an intersection with Leigh Farm Road, the road narrows to a two-lane road and continues east toward Durham. As NC 54 approaches NC 751 (Hope Valley Road), it widens again to a four-lane road with a turning lane. Once reaching Hope Valley Road, a group of stores are found congregated around the intersection. The road has another immediate intersection with Garrett Road and then begins a slow turn toward the southeast before turning back into a two-lane road and completing its southeasterly turn. After passing Rollingwood Drive, the road again widens up to a four-lane road. Several shopping centers appear as the road nears an intersection with Fayetteville Road. Directly after the intersection, the road narrows back down to a two-lane road and passes under I-40 at a diagonal. The route somewhat parallels the freeway and forms the northern border for the Wellington Forest neighborhood. The route briefly widens at the intersection of Barbee Road before passing by several houses and a park. Just before reaching NC 55 (Apex Highway), NC 54 once again widens to a four-lane road.

Passing NC 55, the road crosses a railroad track before entering into Research Triangle Park. Several office buildings are found both adjacent to and along roads that branch off of NC 54. The road intersects TW Alexander Drive before crossing over NC 885 (Triangle Expressway). NC 54 approaches South Miami Boulevard after crossing under another railroad. At the intersection, NC 54 turns right to follow Miami Boulevard to the south towards Cary. Miami Boulevard crosses Page Road and passes by several office buildings and stores. At Surles Court, the road makes a shift to turn more toward the east, directly paralleling the railroad NC 54 previously crossed under. An interchange with NC 540 marks the road's entrance into Morrisville and the road's name change to Chapel Hill Road.

=== Morrisville to Raleigh ===
Chapel Hill Road begins by running through a primarily residential area of Morrisville. However, after passing McCrimmon Parkway, the area shifts to more industrial-style commerce, including several warehouses. The road intersects Airport Boulevard, which provides access to Raleigh-Durham International Airport. The road runs directly through the middle of Morrisville at intersections with Aviation Parkway/Morrisville Carpenter Road. As Chapel Hill Road bears further to the east, the highway splits from the railroad track that it had been previously running alongside of. Entering into Cary, the road serves as access to the Park West Village Shopping Center and the surrounding apartment complexes. Briefly after intersecting Northwest Cary Parkway, the road narrows back down from a four-lane road to a two-lane road. Continuing further, the road meets back up with the railroad that it had previously broken away from and roughly begins to parallel it again. Chapel Hill Road makes a turn towards the east to meet up with Maynard Road. At the intersection, NC 54 turns left to follow along Maynard Road to the east. The four-lane road passes by West Cary Middle School and Robert Godbold Park before entering into a mixed residential/commercial section north of the center of Cary. Continuing east along Maynard Road, the highway runs along a residential area north of downtown Cary. The road turns toward the southeast and meets up with Reedy Creek Road. Maynard Road meets back up with Chapel Hill Road on the eastern side of downtown Cary. NC 54 turns left onto Chapel Hill Road to continue heading east towards Raleigh. Chapel Hill Road intersects Trinity Road briefly before meeting I-40 at exit 290.

Entering into Raleigh, the road name continues as Chapel Hill Road. Chapel Hill Road intersects the southern terminus of Edwards Mill Road, providing access to Carter-Finley Stadium and the PNC Arena. Briefly after the intersection, NC 54 widens to a four-lane divided road and continues that way until reaching Hillsborough Street. At the intersection, NC 54 continues east onto Hillsborough Street and once again closely parallels the same railroad. NC 54 provides multiple accesses to the North Carolina State Fairgrounds before intersecting Blue Ridge Road. Continuing east, NC 54 runs along the south side of NC State's Centennial Biomedical Campus. NC 54 reaches its eastern terminus at I-440/US 1 at exit 3, a folded diamond interchange. Hillsborough Street continues east to access NC State's North Campus and Downtown Raleigh.

== History ==
The routing for the original NC 54 was included on the 1916 map of the planned state highway system in North Carolina. However, NC 54 was not officially marked on any state highway maps until 1924; it was routed from NC 75 in Pittsboro southeast to NC 50 in Moncure, connecting the town to US 1. By 1929, the first NC 54 was decommissioned and was redesignated as a secondary road.

At the same time, NC 54 was signed along a new routing beginning at US 70/NC 10 in Graham and running along its current routing to US 70/NC 10 in Nelson. In 1930, the route was extended north to Virginia. NC 54 was placed onto a concurrency with NC 100 to Burlington, where it then followed a new routing through Ossipee to NC 703 near Thompsonville. The road followed along a brief concurrency with NC 703 to the west into Thompsonville, where it then was extended back onto a new routing north to Reidsville. It then replaced NC 709 north to the Virginia border. By 1940 the routing of NC 54 north of Graham was replaced by NC 87. The route was then extended along a section of NC 93 to connect with US 70 on the western side of Burlington. NC 54 was extended along US 70A between 1952 and 1953, and then placed onto Chapel Hill Road to Cary where it ended at US 1. By 1955, NC 54 was placed from its routing through downtown Chapel Hill along its current bypass around Carrboro and Chapel Hill. The previous routing was signed as NC 54A and, by 1959, became NC 54 Business before being decommissioned in 1985. The route was extended along Hillsborough Street by 1963 to US 1, which later became Interstate 440. Between 2000 and 2002, NC 54 was routed onto the northern loop of Maynard Road around Cary.

In 2022, an extension to McCrimmon Parkway along the eastern side of NC 54 and the center of town was opened. The road serves as a bypass of NC 54, which is mostly two lanes through the town.

== Future ==
In October 2015, the towns of Cary and Morrisville held a joint meeting over the future of NC 54 between the towns. NC 54 currently has 16,000 to 20,000 vehicles using the road each day. By 2040, the towns project that nearly 45,000 vehicles will be using the road daily. NCDOT, the Capital Area Metropolitan Planning Organization, and the Town of Morrisville teamed up on the study of the six-mile (9.7 km) corridor from NC 540 to Maynard Road. Ideally, the road would become a four- to six-lane superstreet from the Durham County line southeast into Cary. Besides the study, the NCDOT has yet to allocate money to make improvements to NC 54.

== Major intersections ==
County	Location	mi	km	Destinations	Notes
Alamance	Burlington	0.0	0.0	US 70 / NC 62 (Church Street) – Greensboro, Archdale, Mebane, Yanceyville	Right-in/right-out intersection
Alamance	Burlington	2.2	3.5	NC 49 south / NC 100 west (Maple Avenue) to I-40 / I-85 – Liberty, Whitsett, Greensboro, Hillsborough	West end of concurrency with NC 49; eastern terminus of NC 100
Alamance	Graham	3.2	5.1	NC 87 north (Elm Street) – Reidsville	West end of concurrency with NC 87
Alamance	Graham	3.8	6.1	NC 87 south (Main Street) – Pittsboro	East end of concurrency with NC 87
Alamance	Graham	4.1	6.6	NC 49 north (Elm Street) – Haw River	East end of concurrency with NC 49
Alamance	Graham	4.8– 4.9	7.7– 7.9	I-40 / I-85 – Charlotte, Winston-Salem, Durham, Raleigh	Diamond interchange; exit 148 on I-40/I-85
Alamance	Swepsonville	8.2	13.2	NC 119 north – Mebane	Southern terminus of NC 119
Orange	Carrboro	26.4– 26.7	42.5– 43.0	Jones Ferry Road – Carrboro	Diamond interchange
Orange	Carrboro	27.2– 27.6	43.8– 44.4	Smith Level Road / South Greensboro Street / Merrit Mill Road	Diamond interchange
Orange	Chapel Hill	28.2– 28.7	45.4– 46.2	US 15 south / US 501 south / NC 86 north (Columbia Street) – Fearrington, Hillsborough	West end of concurrency with US 15/US 501; southern terminus of NC 86; diamond interchange
Orange	Chapel Hill	30.3– 30.6	48.8– 49.2	US 15 north / US 501 north (Fordham Boulevard) / Raleigh Road – Durham	East end of concurrency with US 15/US 501; cloverleaf interchange
Durham	Durham	33.3– 33.5	53.6– 53.9	I-40 (John Motley Morehead III Freeway) – Mebane, Raleigh	Diamond interchange; exit 273 on I-40
Durham	Durham	34.6	55.7	NC 751 (Hope Valley Road) – Apex	
Durham	Durham	38.6	62.1	NC 55 (Apex Highway) – Cary, Apex	
Wake	Morrisville	43.0– 43.2	69.2– 69.5	NC 540 to I-540 – Durham	Partial cloverleaf interchange; exit 69 on NC 540
Wake	Cary–Raleigh city line	51.8– 52.0	83.4– 83.7	I-40 (Tom Bradshaw Freeway) – Durham, Benson	Diamond and partial cloverleaf interchange; exit 290 on I-40
Wake	Raleigh	54.8– 55.0	88.2– 88.5	I-440 / US 1 – Wake Forest, Apex	Eastern terminus; partial cloverleaf interchange; exit 3A on I-440
1.000 mi = 1.609 km; 1.000 km = 0.621 mi: Concurrency terminus

== Related route ==
North Carolina Highway 54A
- Location: Carrboro–Chapel Hill
- Length: 4.4 mi (7.1 km)
- Existed: 1956–1959

North Carolina Highway 54 Business
- Location: Carrboro–Chapel Hill
- Length: 4.4 mi (7.1 km)
- Existed: 1959–1985

North Carolina Highway 54 Alternate (NC 54A) was a renumbering of NC 54 through Carrboro (via Main Street) and Chapel Hill (via Franklin Street, Columbia Street, South Road and Raleigh Road). The route was commissioned in 1955 after NC 54 was shifted from its downtown Chapel Hill routing to the new Carrboro and Chapel Hill bypass. NC 54A served as a connection into Chapel Hill and to the campus of the University of North Carolina at Chapel Hill. The route was redesignated NC 54 Business (NC 54 Bus.) in 1959. In 1985, the route was decommissioned and became secondary streets.
