= Durham Freeway =

The Durham Freeway is a freeway located entirely within Durham County in the U.S. state of North Carolina. It follows:

- Interstate 885 from I-40 at Research Triangle Park to NC 147 southeast of downtown Durham; and
- North Carolina Highway 147 from I-885 southeast of downtown Durham to I-85 northwest of downtown Durham.
