= R. Kelly Bryant Jr. Pedestrian Bridge =

Bridge in Durham, North Carolina

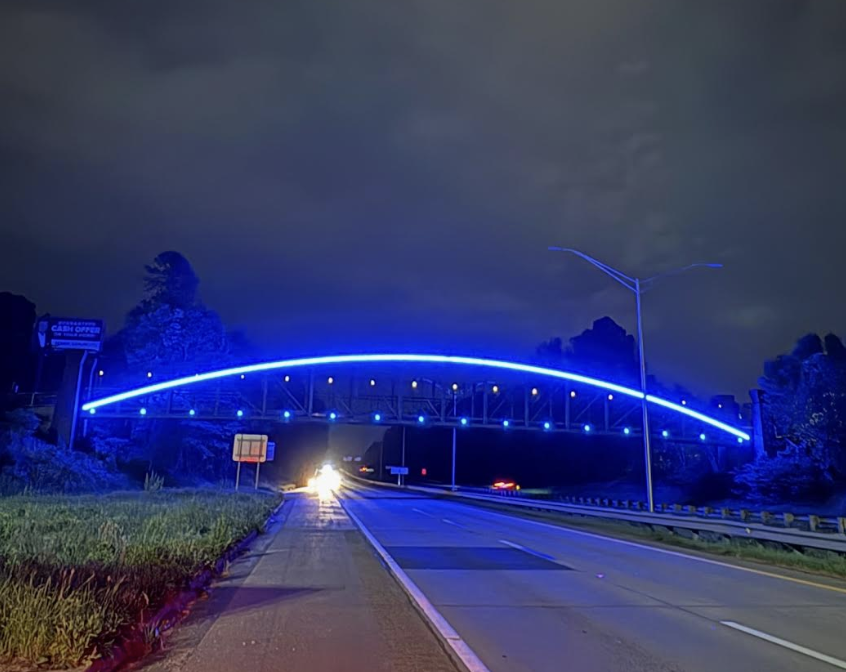
- The bridge in 2025
- Coordinates: 35.9811°N 78.8875°W
- Carries: Pedestrians
- Crosses: North Carolina Highway 147
- Locale: Durham, North Carolina, U.S.
- Named for: Robert Kelly Brant Jr.

History
- Constructed by: Stewart Engineering
- Construction end: 2010
- Construction cost: $2.2 million
- Opened: September 16, 2010

Location
- Interactive map of R. Kelly Bryant Jr. Pedestrian Bridge

The R. Kelly Bryant Jr. Pedestrian Bridge is a bridge in Durham, North Carolina. It crosses over North Carolina Highway 147, connecting the Hayti District and East Durham Historic District. The bridge is named after Robert Kelly Bryant Jr., a local historian of African-American history.

== History ==
In 1958, an urban renewal and freeway project resulted in the demolition of houses and local businesses across 200 acres of Hayti, an affluent African-American neighborhood in Durham, North Carolina. The neighborhood was divided when North Carolina Highway 147 (also known as the Durham Freeway) was built, splitting through Hayti, causing economic hardship for residents. In 1973, a pedestrian bridge was constructed over the freeway in an effort to relieve tensions rising among residents and prevent race riots. After becoming a center for drug trafficking and other illegal activities, the bridge was shut off from pedestrian traffic in 1995.

In 2003, the Durham Parks and Recreation Department discovered unused freeway funds and announced a plan to rebuild the bridge. The project cost $2.2 million with 80 percent paid for by the North Carolina Department of Transportation and twenty percent paid for by the city of Durham. It opened to the public on September 16, 2010, and was named after Robert Kelly Bryant Jr., a historian of the Hayti community. Constructed along Lakeland Street, the bridge connects Durham's south side neighborhoods, and Burton Park, to the Durham Green Flea Market on the north side.

At night, the bridge is lit with blue LED lights. In 2013, following complaints of the bridge no longer being lit since its opening, Mayor Steve Schewel ordered that the lights be restored.

The bridge is a part of the proposed R. Kelly Bryant Bridge Trail, a 3-mile trail, stretching from the Rocky Creek Trail south of North Carolina Central University to Drew/Granby Park in East Durham.
