= Interstate 885 =

Highway in North Carolina, United States

Interstate 885 and North Carolina Highway 885
- I-885 highlighted in red; NC 885 highlighted in purple

Route information
- Auxiliary route of I-85
- Maintained by NCDOT
- Length: 11.5 mi (18.5 km)
- Existed: June 30, 2022–present

Interstate 885
- South end: I-40 in RTP
- Major intersections: NC 147 in Durham; US 70 in Durham; US 70 Bus. / NC 98 in Durham
- North end: I-85 / US 15 / US 70 in Durham

North Carolina Highway 885
- South end: NC 540 Toll in Morrisville
- North end: I-40 in RTP

Location
- Country: United States
- State: North Carolina
- Counties: Wake, Durham

Highway system
- Interstate Highway System; Main; Auxiliary; Suffixed; Business; Future; North Carolina Highway System; Interstate; US; State; Scenic
← I-840	→ NC 901

Interstate 885 (I-885) and North Carolina Highway 885 (NC 885) are an 11.5-mile (18.5 km) auxiliary Interstate Highway and state highway in the U.S. state of North Carolina. It links NC 540 and I-40 to I-85 in the Durham area. The route consists of two previously preexisting segments of freeway—NC 147 to the south and US 70 to the north—connected by the East End Connector, which opened to traffic on June 30, 2022.

NC 147 was truncated and removed from the southern half of the Durham Freeway and the northern section of the Triangle Expressway, which were redesignated I-885 and NC 885, respectively. The route is cosigned with US 70 from exit 10 to its northern terminus. The route provides a continuous freeway bypass east of downtown Durham and also provides freeway access from I-40 and I-85 to the Research Triangle Park and (via NC 147) to downtown Durham.

== Route description ==
NC 885 begins at the interchange with NC 540. The whole route carries the moniker of the Triangle Expressway, which it inherits from the portion of NC 540 south of the aforementioned interchange. It has a single interchange with Davis Drive and Hopson Road between its termini. NC 885 ends at the interchange with I-40, at which I-885 promptly begins. Running north on the Durham Freeway (former NC 147) through the Research Triangle Park, three closely-spaced interchanges link the route to East Cornwallis Road, T.W. Alexander Drive, and Ellis Road. At the Durham city line, NC 147 begins and diverges toward downtown Durham, while I-885 heads northeast on the East End Connector before joining US 70, curving to the northwest concurrent with the latter route. The freeway turns due north as it comes to US 70 Business (US 70 Bus)/NC 98 at a junction that was reconstructed as a compressed diamond interchange. After continuing north and meeting Cheek Road, the Interstate ends at a semi-directional T interchange with its parent route, I-85.

== Tolls ==
Toll NC 885, a segment of the Triangle Expressway, uses open road tolling and is operated by the North Carolina Turnpike Authority; tolling is between NC 540 (exit 1) and I-40 (exit 5). Electronic toll gantries are located on the entrance/exit ramps so that all motorists will pass through at least one. Tolls payable with a valid transponder (NC Quick Pass, E-ZPass, Peach Pass, or SunPass) or bill by mail, which uses automatic license plate recognition and charge double the posted rate with additional fees.

As of June 2026, the total toll rate for two-axle vehicles on the length of Toll NC 885 is $1.04 with valid transponder and $2.08 for bill-by-mail. Three-axle rates are twice the two-axle rates; four-or-more-axle rates are three times the two-axle rates.

== History ==
The first section of what eventually became I-885 to be constructed was the portion of US 70 between the East End Connector and I-85, completed by 1957 with US 70 relocated onto it. The East End Connector first appeared in Durham's 1959 thoroughfare plan but was shelved and its funding diverted to other priorities such as NC 147, the Durham Freeway. The portion of NC 147 concurrent with the proposed Interstate opened in the early 1970s, including accommodation for an interchange with the Connector. The project would resurface in the 1990s when the North Carolina Department of Transportation (NCDOT) studied it again, but it would not receive funding until it appeared in the 2009–2015 Transportation Improvement Plan. In the meantime, as part of a larger widening project on I-85, the early 2000s saw the reconstruction of the US 70 freeway between I-85 and Cheek Road, widening the section to six lanes and bringing it up to modern Interstate Highway standards as well as adding the missing movements at the interchange with I-85.

The I-885 designation did not become public knowledge until the release of signing plans in 2014, though NCDOT had not yet received approval from the Federal Highway Administration (FHWA). Later sign plans from NCDOT indicated that I-885 was expected to be signed immediately upon the completion of the East End Connector, pending approval from the FHWA. Construction on the East End Connector began in April of the following year. In addition to the construction of a short segment of new freeway between NC 147 and US 70, the section of US 70 between Cheek Road and the connector was being realigned and widened to six lanes. Work at the interchange between NC 147 and the connector was expected to be completed in June 2018, but work in that area continued past that date, as the completion date got pushed back to mid-2022.

In May 2022, AASHTO approved the establishment of I-885; this was followed with the East End Connector opening to traffic on June 30, 2022, at which point I-885 was signed on the entirety of its designated corridor. The portion of former NC 147 from NC 540 to I-40 was redesignated as NC 885.

== Future ==
The NCDOT 2020–2029 Final STIP released in September 2019 indicated a project that would widen 3.9 miles (6.3 km) of I-885 to six lanes from the East End Connector Project south to I-40 at a cost of $1.8 million. However, the Durham Chapel Hill Carrboro Metropolitan Planning Organization (DCHC MPO) removed this proposal from its plans, leaving this project in question.

=== NC 885 extension ===
In 2012, a proposal to extend NC 147 (now NC 885) from its current southern terminus south to McCrimmon Parkway, in Morrisville, was scheduled for re-prioritization. As of October 2020, the project had been scheduled for right-of-way acquisition in 2024 and would break ground in 2027, but these dates have since been delayed.

== Exit List ==
County	Location	mi	km	Exit	Destinations	Notes
Wake	Morrisville				McCrimmon Parkway	Proposed extension (unfunded)
Wake	Morrisville	0.0	0.0	1	NC 540 Toll to I-40 / I-540 / US 1 – Raleigh, Sanford	Southern terminus of NC 885; Triangle Expressway continues as NC 540 south
Durham	Research Triangle Park	0.7	1.1	2 / 3	Davis Drive / Hopson Road	Signed exit 2 northbound, exit 3 southbound
Durham	Research Triangle Park				T.W. Alexander Drive	Permanently closed as of September 6, 2011; former southern terminus of NC 147; known as the T.W. Alexader Spur/NC 147 spur
Durham	Research Triangle Park	3.1	5.0	5	I-40 to NC 54 – Raleigh, Chapel Hill	Northern end of NC 885 and southern end of I-885; northern terminus of the Triangle Expressway
Durham	Research Triangle Park	4.1	6.6	6	Research Triangle Park / East Cornwallis Road	
Durham	Research Triangle Park	4.7	7.6	7	T.W. Alexander Drive	
Durham	Research Triangle Park	5.8	9.3	8	Ellis Road	
Durham	Durham	7.7	12.4	9	NC 147 north – Durham	Left exit, southern terminus of NC 147
Durham	Durham	8.6	13.8	10	US 70 east – Raleigh	South end of US 70 overlap
Durham	Durham	9.8	15.8	11	US 70 Bus. west / NC 98 – Durham, Wake Forest	
Durham	Durham	10.8	17.4	12	Cheek Road	Former exit 286
Durham	Durham	11.5	18.5	13	I-85 south / US 15 south / US 70 west – Greensboro I-85 north / US 15 north – Henderson, Petersburg	Northern terminus of I-885; north end of US 70 overlap; ramp to southbound I-85 unnumbered; former exit 285
1.000 mi = 1.609 km; 1.000 km = 0.621 mi: Closed/former; Concurrency terminus; Route transition; Unopened
