= Triangle Town Center =

Coordinates: 35.8663°N 78.5795°W

- Location: Raleigh, North Carolina, USA
- Opened: August 14, 2002
- Developer: Jacobs/CBL Properties
- Manager: Summit Properties USA
- Owner: Summit Properties USA
- Num. of anchor tenants: 5 (2 open; 3 vacant)
- Floor area: 1,272,263 sq ft (118,197.1 m^{2})
- Floors: 2
- Website: triangletowncenter.com

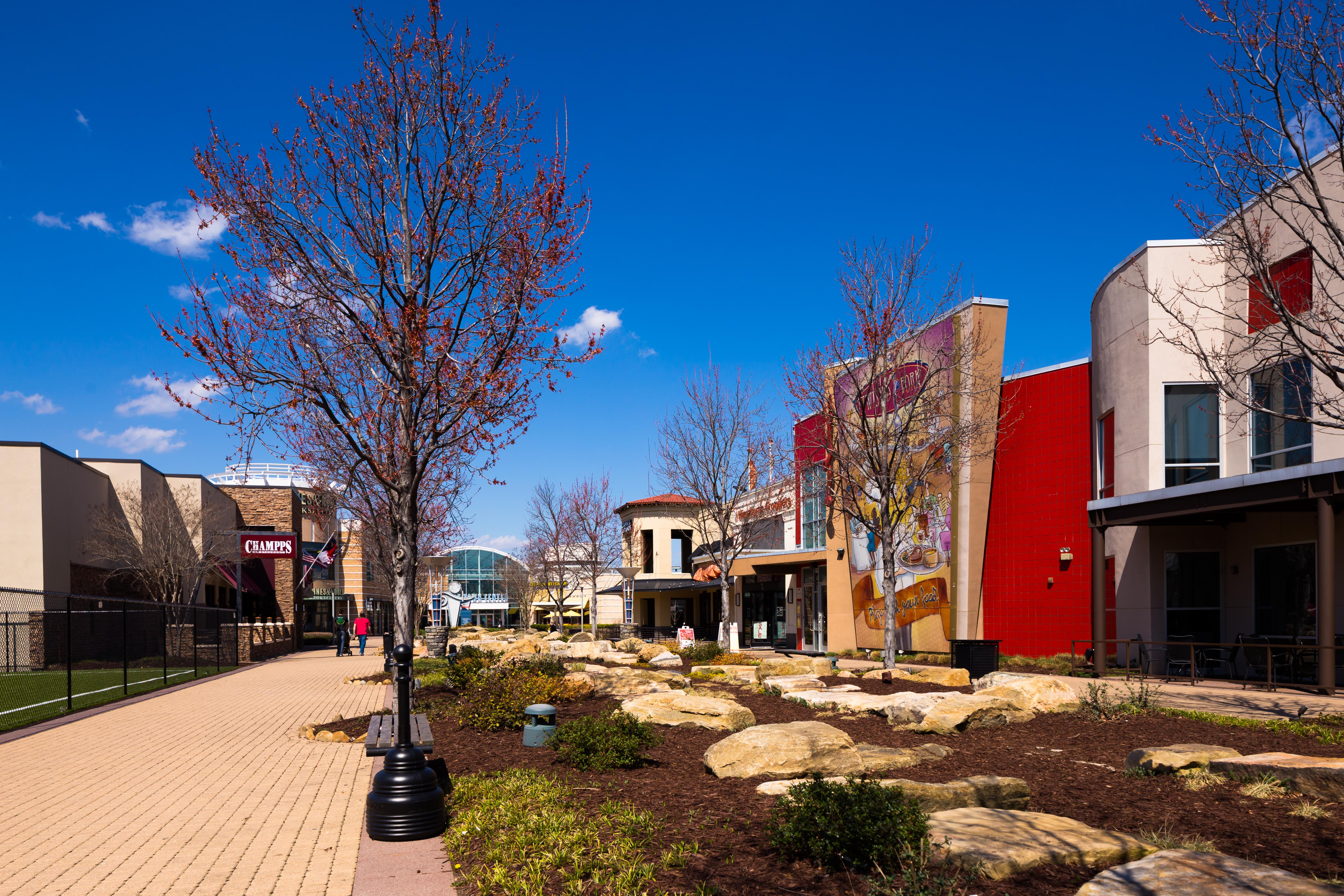
The Commons

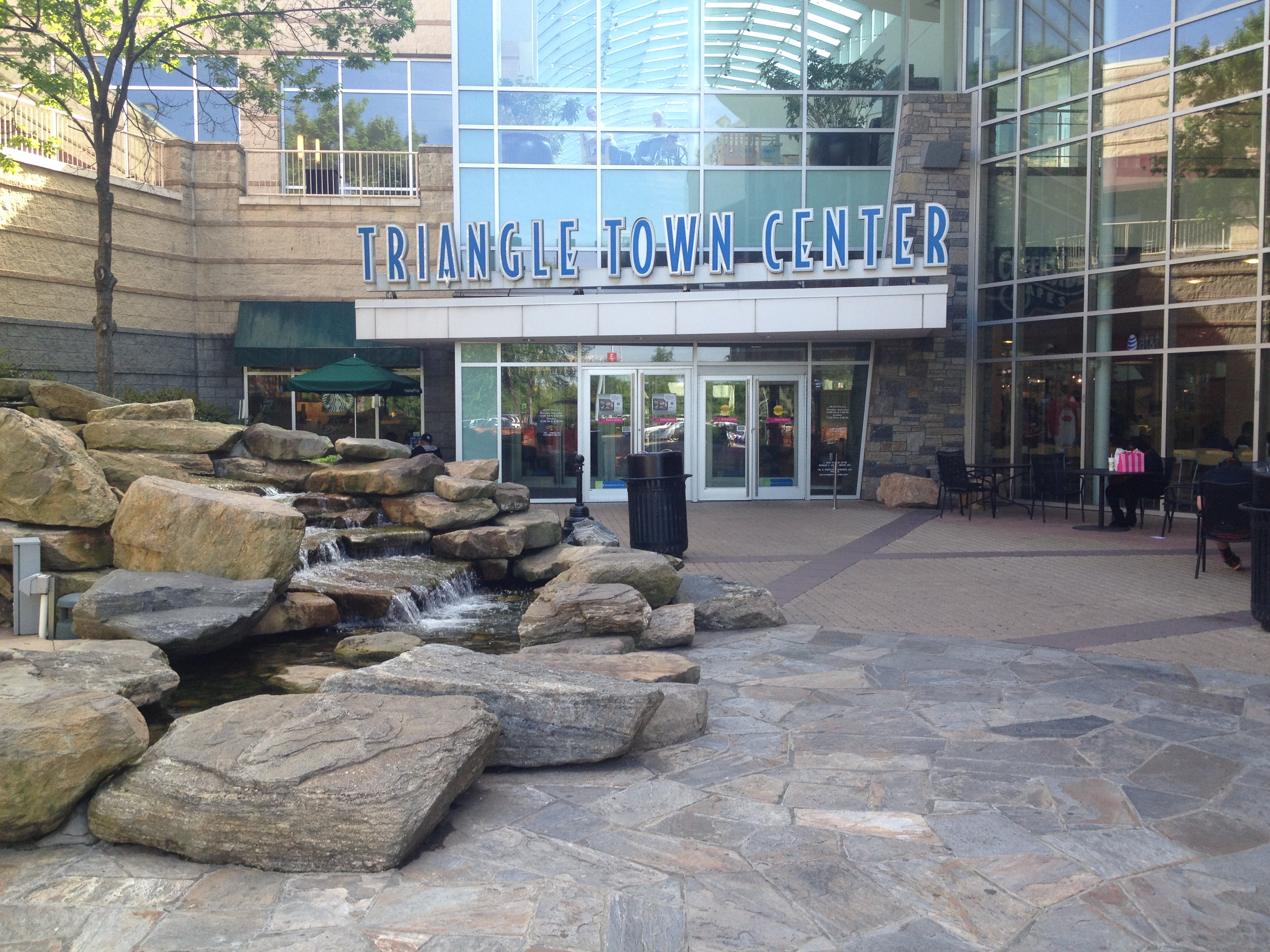
East Entrance

Triangle Town Center is a shopping mall in Raleigh, North Carolina. It is located in North Raleigh off U.S. Highway 1 (Capital Boulevard) and Interstate 540. The mall features anchor stores Belk, Belk Outlet, Barnes & Noble, and Dillard's. There are three vacant anchors formerly occupied by Sears, Macy's and Saks Fifth Avenue.

== History ==
Triangle Town Center opened on August 14, 2002 with anchors Hudson Belk, Sears, Dillard's, and Hecht's. Construction of the mall required re-routing of existing roads. Saks Fifth Avenue, the state's first, opened later in 2004. The mall features a two-level Barnes & Noble, which serves as a junior anchor.

On July 26, 2008, at approximately 8 pm, a fight broke out on the mall's upper level. The fight involved approximately a dozen teenagers and incited upwards of 150 other teens to act out. The mall was evacuated. The fight lasted about 20 minutes before Raleigh Police and Wake County sheriff's deputies restored order. Raleigh Police say that the incident was gang-related.

On April 18, 2015, a 25-year old woman who was six months pregnant was shot in the mall's parking lot and later died.

On October 10, 2018, a water main broke causing the mall to evacuate and close early. The mall reopened a week later, with some stores closing for several months for renovations, including H&M, Kay Jewelers, and Zales Jewelers. The stores never reopened due to the COVID-19 pandemic. As of 2023, local businesses have occupied the former spaces, including Lim's, Yumna Jewelers, and Malay Jewelers.

On August 6, 2021, it was announced that Sears would shutter as part of an ongoing decision to phase out of its traditional brick-and-mortar format.

Kohan Retail Investment Group purchased the mall in November 2021. Cinnabon would return to the mall at this time, replacing the Starbucks adjacent to the food court. New York-based Summit Properties USA purchased the 70-acre mall from Kohan in December 2024 as new development would come to the mall. As of October 2025, more vacant spaces have been filled by local shops moving in, including Fight or Flight Comics, Animazed, and Anime X.

On January 8, 2026, Macy's announced that it would be closing as part of a plan to close 14 stores by the end of Q1 in 2026. The store closed on April 26, 2026, with all merchandise on sale for 80% off.

On March 6, 2026, Saks Global announced the closure of 12 Saks Fifth Avenue and 3 Neiman Marcus locations nationwide in an effort to further cut costs and focus on more profitable locations, including the only Saks store in NC at Triangle Town Center. The store closed on May 16, 2026.

On April 8, 2026, police responded after receiving reports of shots fired in the mall's parking lot. No victims were reported but two suspects were arrested after fleeing from the scene and crashing a short distance away. A week later, on April 17, 2026, three people were shot inside of the mall after a fight between two groups began near the Express store.

=== Anchors ===
- Belk 180,230 sq ft (16,744 m^{2}) Signed as Hudson Belk until 2010
- Dillard's 206,000 sq ft (19,100 m^{2})

=== Former anchors ===
- Hecht's (became Macy's in 2006)
- Sears 144,846 sq ft (13,456.6 m^{2}) (closed in 2021)
- Macy's 179,930 sq ft (16,716 m^{2}) (closed in 2026)
- Saks Fifth Avenue 83,066 sq ft (7,717.1 m^{2}) (closed in 2026)
