= Bridgeton, North Carolina =

- Town
- Seal

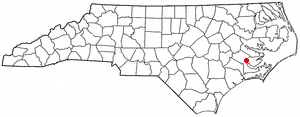
- Location of Bridgeton, North Carolina
- Coordinates: 35°07′13″N 77°00′50″W
- Country: United States
- State: North Carolina
- County: Craven

Area
  - Total: 2.05 sq mi (5.31 km^{2})
  - Land: 2.05 sq mi (5.30 km^{2})
  - Water: 0.0039 sq mi (0.01 km^{2})
- Elevation: 7 ft (2.1 m)

Population (2020)
  - Total: 349
  - Density: 170.5/sq mi (65.84/km^{2})
- Time zone: UTC-5 (Eastern (EST))
  - Summer (DST): UTC-4 (EDT)
- ZIP code: 28519
- Area code: 252
- FIPS code: 37-07860
- GNIS feature ID: 2405319
- Website: townofbridgetonnc.gov

Bridgeton is a town in Craven County, North Carolina, United States. As of the 2020 census, Bridgeton had a population of 349. It is part of the New Bern, North Carolina Micropolitan Statistical Area.

== Geography ==
Bridgeton is located on the eastern shore of the Neuse River, directly across from the city of New Bern, the Craven County seat. U.S. Route 17 passes through the town and connects to New Bern via the massive Neuse River Bridge (opened 1999) across the Neuse River just south of the town limits.

According to the United States Census Bureau, the town has a total area of 1.5 square miles (4.0 km^{2}), of which 0.004 square miles (0.01 km^{2}), or 0.27%, is water.

== Demographics ==
Historical population
Census	Pop.	Note	%±
1910	348		—
1920	548		57.5%
1930	721		31.6%
1940	616		−14.6%
1950	805		30.7%
1960	638		−20.7%
1970	520		−18.5%
1980	461		−11.3%
1990	453		−1.7%
2000	328		−27.6%
2010	454		38.4%
2020	349		−23.1%
U.S. Decennial Census

=== 2020 census ===
Bridgeton racial composition
Race	Number	Percentage
White (non-Hispanic)	266	76.22%
Black or African American (non-Hispanic)	49	14.04%
Native American	2	0.57%
Pacific Islander	1	0.29%
Other/Mixed	15	4.3%
Hispanic or Latino	16	4.58%

As of the 2020 United States census, there were 349 people, 170 households, and 83 families residing in the town.

=== 2000 census ===
As of the census of 2000, there were 328 people, 156 households, and 95 families residing in the town. The population density was 920.7 inhabitants per square mile (355.5/km^{2}). There were 211 housing units at an average density of 592.3 per square mile (228.7/km^{2}). The racial makeup of the town was 95.73% White, 1.52% African American, 0.30% Asian, 0.61% from other races, and 1.83% from two or more races. Hispanic or Latino of any race were 0.91% of the population.

There were 156 households, out of which 19.2% had children under the age of 18 living with them, 46.2% were married couples living together, 11.5% had a female householder with no husband present, and 39.1% were non-families. 33.3% of all households were made up of individuals, and 11.5% had someone living alone who was 65 years of age or older. The average household size was 2.10 and the average family size was 2.62.

In the town, the population was spread out, with 19.5% under the age of 18, 7.3% from 18 to 24, 24.1% from 25 to 44, 28.4% from 45 to 64, and 20.7% who were 65 years of age or older. The median age was 44 years. For every 100 females, there were 94.1 males. For every 100 females age 18 and over, there were 88.6 males.

The median income for a household in the town was $30,375, and the median income for a family was $35,833. Males had a median income of $35,417 versus $35,714 for females. The per capita income for the town was $17,038. About 21.2% of families and 21.2% of the population were below the poverty line, including 31.0% of those under age 18 and 7.1% of those age 65 or over.
