= Interstate 540 (North Carolina) =

Beltway encircling Raleigh, North Carolina

Interstate 540 and North Carolina Highway 540
- Raleigh Outer Loop
- I-540 highlighted in red; open segment of NC 540 in purple; unopen segment of NC 540 in orange

Route information
- Auxiliary route of I-40
- Maintained by NCDOT
- Length: 58.74 mi (94.53 km) I-540: 25.84 mi (41.59 km); NC 540: 32.9 mi (52.9 km)
- Existed: 1997–present
- Component highways: I-540 (Durham–Knightdale); NC 540 (Garner–Durham)

Major junctions
- Beltway around Raleigh
- I-40 in Durham; US 70 near Raleigh; US 1 in Raleigh; US 401 in Raleigh; I-87 / US 64 / US 264 in Knightdale; US 70 near Garner; I-40 / I-42 near Garner; US 401 near Garner; US 1 near Apex; US 64 in Apex; NC 885 Toll in Morrisville

Location
- Country: United States
- State: North Carolina
- Counties: Durham, Wake

Highway system
- Interstate Highway System; Main; Auxiliary; Suffixed; Business; Future; North Carolina Highway System; Interstate; US; State; Scenic
← NC 522	→ NC 561

Interstate 540 (I-540) and North Carolina Highway 540 (NC 540), also known as the Raleigh Outer Loop, form a partially completed beltway around the city of Raleigh, North Carolina, United States. When complete, it will fully encircle the city and nearby suburbs, meeting its parent route of I-40 in two locations. The first 25.84-mile (41.59 km) section from Durham to Knightdale is an Interstate Highway, and the remaining 32.9-mile (52.9 km) section from Garner to Durham is a North Carolina state highway.

The first section of I-540 runs from I-40 near the Raleigh–Durham International Airport to I-87/U.S. Highway 64 (US 64)/US 264 south of Knightdale. The route opened in January 2007, and was intended to be renumbered to I-640 and an Interstate highway in full when completed. The NCDOT decided against both when it became financially unfeasible to construct the entire route with public funds within a reasonable timeframe.

The remaining portion of the route (approximately two-thirds of the total completed mileage) is a toll road (part of the Triangle Expressway) that has been constructed as a North Carolina state highway. The first section of NC 540 was opened in July 2007, extending westward from the western terminus of I-540. Further extensions have carried NC 540 around the western side of Wake County to its current southwestern terminus south of Apex; an extension to Garner was scheduled to open in late-August 2024, but was delayed to late-September 2024. The final project planned to complete the eastern leg from Garner to Knightdale under the same toll system also began construction in 2024 with a completion date of 2028.

== Route description ==
When completed, the beltway will total 70 miles (110 km) in length, surrounding the city of Raleigh and the towns of Apex, Cary, Garner, and Morrisville. The designation from I-540 and NC 540 happens at I-40, in Durham County, where I-540 goes east and NC 540 goes west.

The beltway is further broken down into four segments:

Segment name	Designation	Location	Length
Northern Wake Expressway	I-540, NC 540	NC 54 to I-87/US 64/US 264	29 mi (47 km)
Western Wake Expressway	NC 540	NC 54 in Cary to NC 55 south of Apex	12.4 mi (20.0 km)
Southern Wake Expressway	NC 540	NC 55 to I-40 near Garner	16.5 mi (26.6 km)
Eastern Wake Expressway (construction started in May 2024; estimated completion 2028)	NC 540	I-40 to I-87/US 64/US 264	12.9 mi (20.8 km)
Total			70.8 mi (113.9 km)

=== Interstate 540 ===
The I-540 portion begins at an interchange designated as exit 1 near I-40 (I-40 exit 283B) near the Raleigh–Durham International Airport, located right at the Durham–Wake county line. It travels northeast to Aviation Parkway (exit 2), then turns east along the southside of the Brier Creek neighborhood, with interchanges at Lumley Road (exit 3) and US 70 (exit 4). After crossing US 70, I-540 travels eastward across the mostly residential areas of North Raleigh, with several exits with major arterial roads, including Leesville Road (exit 7), NC 50/Creedmoor Road (exit 9), Six Forks Road (exit 11), and Falls of Neuse Road (exit 14). Turning southeast, there is a complex interchange with US 1/Capital Boulevard (exit 16) and Triangle Town Boulevard (exit 17), which provide access to the Triangle Town Center shopping mall and commercial district along Capital Boulevard. Shortly after the interchange with US 401/Louisburg Road (exit 18), I-540 crosses the Neuse River and then turns south towards Knightdale. I-540 immediately has an interchange with Buffaloe Road (exit 20). I-540 continues south paralleling both the Neuse River and Forestville Road. As I-540 enters Knightdale, it has an interchange with U.S. Highway 64 Business (US 64 Bus.)/Knightdale Boulevard (exit 24). About two miles (3.2 km) after the US 64 Bus. interchange, I-540 has its western terminus at I-87/US 64/US 264 (exit 26), though the roadway continues on for a short distance, and several ghost ramps indicate the planned connection to the rest of the loop.

=== North Carolina Highway 540 ===
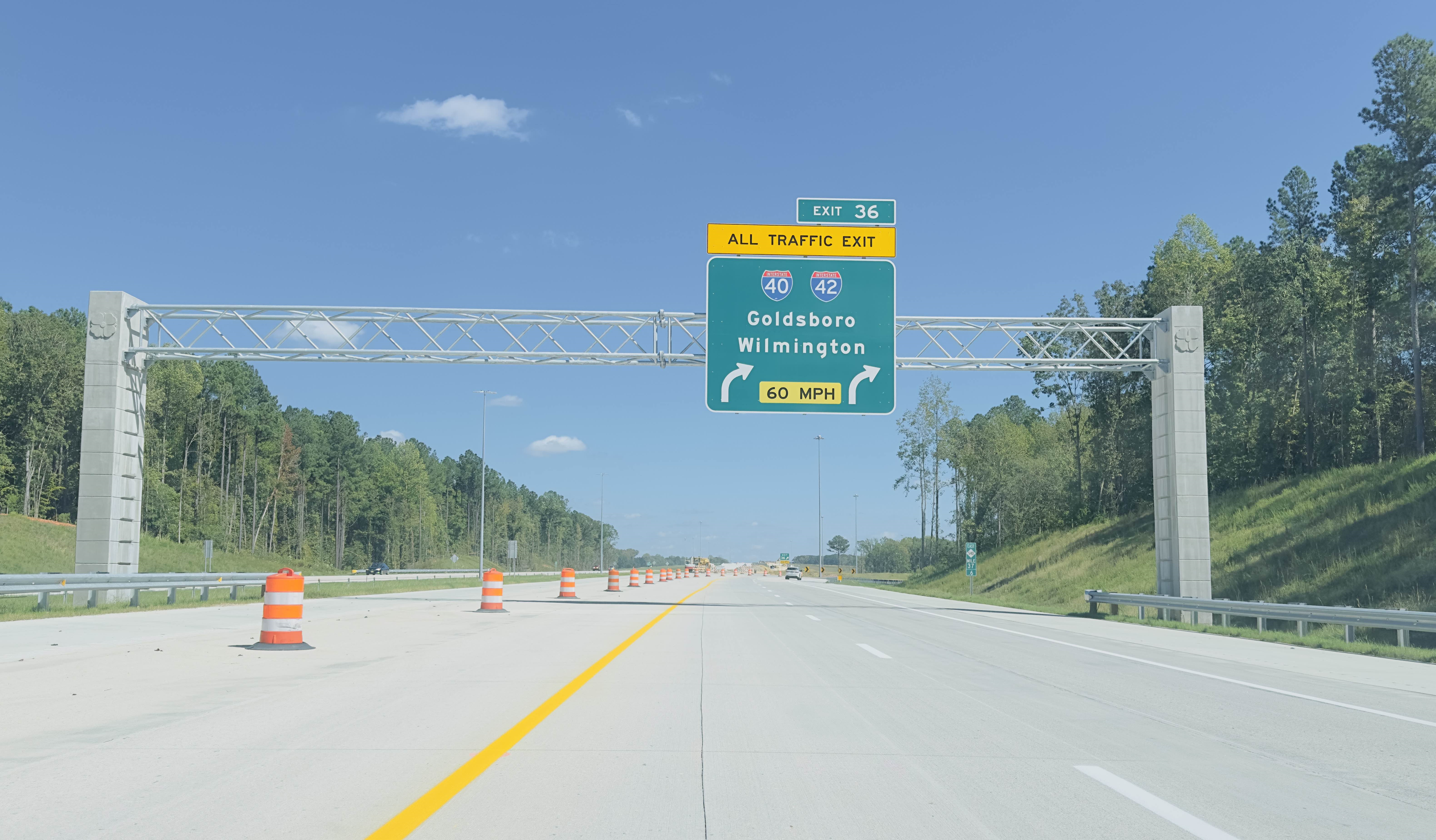
NC 540 approaching I-40 near Garner (its current eastern terminus)

NC 540 is the designation given to the Western Wake Expressway, Southern Wake Expressway and the future Eastern Wake Expressway. The Western Wake Expressway and the Southern Wake Expressway also forms a portion of the Triangle Expressway toll road complex. The Southern Wake Expressway begins at a turbine interchange with I-40 and I-42 southeast of Garner. The road heads due west around suburban developments, having interchanges at NC 50 (exit 39), Old Stage Road (exit 43), US 401 (exit 45), Bells Lake Road (exit 47), and Holly Springs Road (exit 50). The road eventually reaches NC 55 (exit 54) just south of Apex, where it becomes the Western Wake Expressway. At this point, the road is heading due west and has two quick interchanges with Veridea Road (exit 55) and US 1 (exit 56) after turning to the northwest. Exit 56 connects to Salem Street, connecting to downtown Apex, while exit 59 connects to US 64 near the Beaver Creek Shopping Center. Now heading due north and between Green Level Church Road (to the west) and NC 55 (to the east), the road skirts the western edge of Cary, with interchanges at Green Level Road (exit 62) and Morrisville Parkway (exit 64). Just north of the former community of Carpenter (since annexed by Cary) is a second interchange with NC 55 (exit 66). The Triangle Expressway toll road splits at NC 540 at exit 67 to follow NC 885, along where the Triangle Expressway ends at NC 54 (exit 69) before meeting I-40 at exit 1 and continuing on as I-540.

== Tolls ==
Toll NC 540, a segment of the Triangle Expressway, uses open road tolling and is operated by the North Carolina Turnpike Authority; tolling is between I-40/I-42 (exit 36) and NC 54 (exit 69). Electronic toll gantries are located on the expressway mainline between each interchange so that all motorists will pass through at least one. Tolls payable with a valid transponder (NC Quick Pass, E-ZPass, Peach Pass, or SunPass) or bill by mail, which uses automatic license plate recognition and charge double the posted rate with additional fees.

As of June 2026, the total toll rate for two-axle vehicles on the length of Toll NC 540 is $8.04 with valid transponder and $16.08 for bill-by-mail. Three-axle rates are twice the two-axle rates; four-or-more-axle rates are three times the two-axle rates.

== History ==
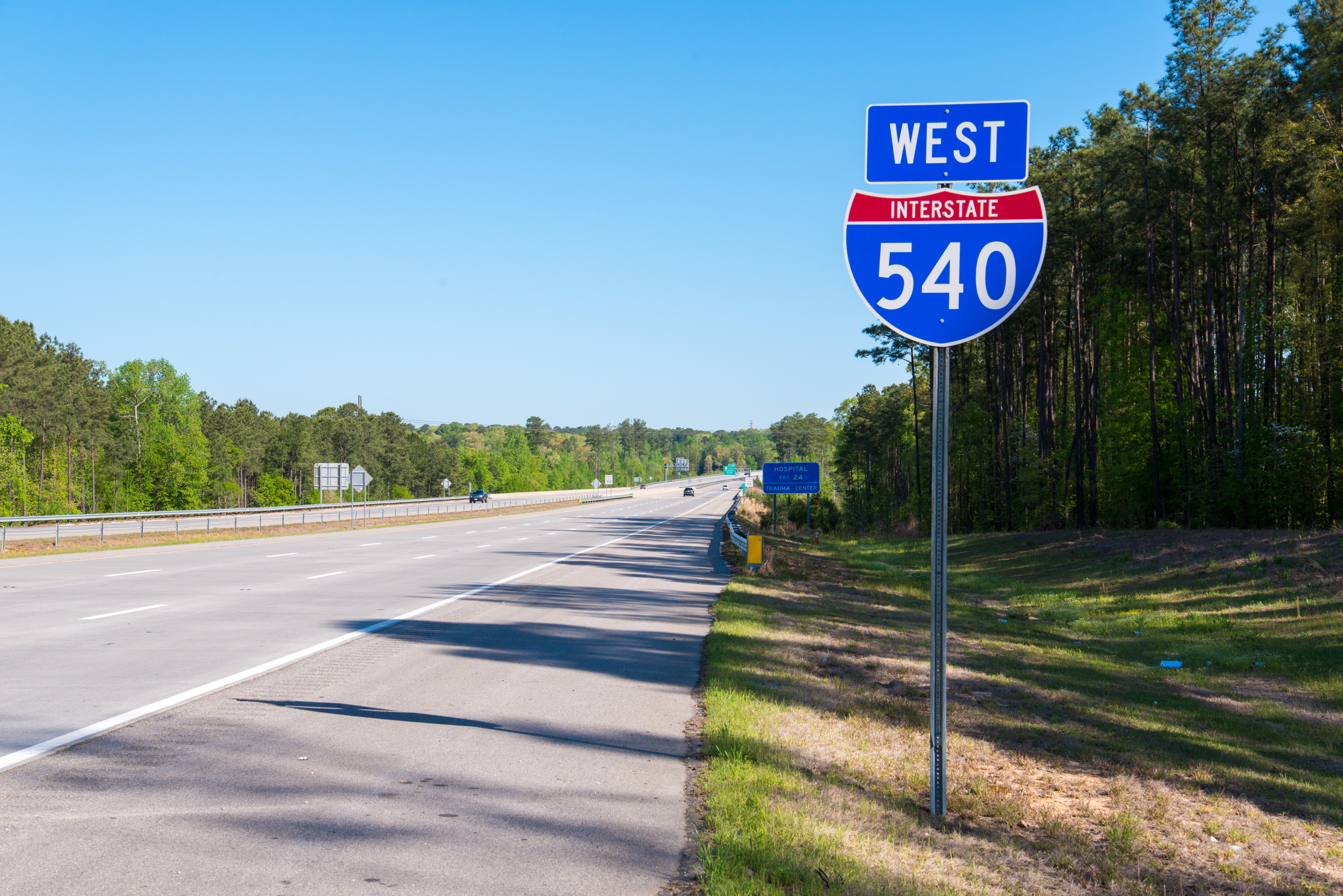
I-540 West, near Knightdale

Planning for the highway originally started in the early 1970s; by 1976, the "Northern Wake Expressway" was added to the planning map. In the mid-1980s, realizing that the growth in western Wake County may require more roads than planned, highway planners decided to expand the project as a new beltway around Raleigh. In 1992, construction began on the first three-mile (4.8 km) section of the Northern Wake Expressway, connecting I-40 with US 70. On January 21, 1997, the freeway opened as I-540.

In the following 10 years, the now known Northern Wake Freeway (so not to be confused with the Triangle Expressway) made several extensions:

- December 11, 1999: From US 70/Glenwood Avenue (exit 4) to Leesville Road (exit 7).
- December 21, 2000: From Leesville Road (exit 7) to NC 50/Creedmoor Road (exit 9).
- June 29, 2001: From NC 50/Creedmoor Road (exit 9) to Falls of Neuse Road (exit 14).
- August 12, 2002: From Falls of Neuse Road (exit 14) to US 1/Capital Boulevard/Triangle Town Boulevard (exit 16).
- January 16, 2007: From Triangle Town Boulevard (exit 17) to US 64/US 264/Knightdale Bypass (exit 26).

From 1999 to 2002, each additional section of the freeway was designated as Future 540, until it connected with US 1.

On July 14, 2007, a section of the loop from I-40 west to NC 54 and NC 55 was opened. However, the route is signed not as I-540 but as NC 540. Officials decided to change the designation in early July at the urging of the North Carolina Turnpike Authority (NCTA). Work on the western and southern portions of the beltway, if paid for by state funds, would possibly not open until 2030. At the request of several Wake County mayors, the NCTA in 2006 began studying the use of tolls to complete these portions of the Outer Loop.

The Authority concluded in early 2007 that it would be financially feasible to build the western section (along with an extended Durham Freeway, which combined would be called the "Triangle Expressway") using toll funds. The NCTA apparently never wanted an Interstate designation for the Western Wake Parkway. To lessen motorist confusion about where I-540 ended, the route was truncated to the I-40 interchange. All I-540 signs that were put up along the unopened stretch between I-40 and NC 55 were taken down in early July 2007; the new section is now signed as NC 540. (In addition, I-540 as a completed loop would violate the Interstate numbering convention regarding three-digit routes, as spurs begin with an odd number and loops with an even number, and, at one point, I-640—the last remaining available number within the state, as I-240, I-440, and I-840 are already taken—was proposed for the loop.)

Work to build the Western Wake Freeway, which would be renamed the "Western Wake Parkway" under the toll proposal, began August 12, 2009, with the Triangle Parkway portion opening in December 2011, and Western Wake portion scheduled to open in two phases in 2012.

In October 2008, the authority was unable to issue bonds to fund the Western Wake Turnpike project as planned due to market conditions affecting municipal bonds such as those. On July 29, 2009, the Authority closed on a revised $1.01-billion (equivalent to $1.43 billion in 2024) bond plan, consisting of $270 million (equivalent to $383 million in 2024) in toll revenue bonds, $353 million (equivalent to $500 million in 2024) in Build America Bonds, and a $387-million (equivalent to $548 million in 2024) loan from the US Department of Transportation under the Transportation Infrastructure Finance and Innovation Act.

Groundbreaking was held on August 12, 2009, at the west end of I-540. "A dozen dignitaries" used shovels painted gold as 150 watched.

After work began on Western Wake Parkway in 2009, engineering and environmental studies began a year later for the Southern and Eastern Wake Freeways, also known as the Triangle Expressway Southeast Extension. Construction would begin in 2014 and be completed by 2019; however, it was delayed in March 2011 by the enactment of North Carolina Session Law 2011-7 (N.C. S.L. 2011–7), which forbade the North Carolina Department of Transportation (NCDOT) to consider a few alternative routes.

In 2010, NCDOT made an interchange improvement at I-540/I-40, adding another auxiliary lane from I-540 south to I-40 west at a cost of $4.8 million (equivalent to $6.72 million in 2024).

The completed Triangle Parkway, the first section of the Triangle Expressway, with its connection to NC 540, opened on December 8, 2011, reestablishing exit 67. Collection of tolls began on January 3, 2012. On August 1, 2012, the first phase of the Western Wake Freeway opened, connecting NC 55 in Morrisville (exit 66) to US 64 in Apex. The next day tolling began on the previously open section from NC 54 to NC 55. The final phase of the tolled section of NC 540, from US 64 to NC 55 north of Holly Springs, opened on December 20, 2012. Tolling for this section began January 2, 2013. On April 3, 2017, the Veridea Parkway interchange (exit 55; formally known as Old Holly Springs Apex Road) was opened to traffic. At a cost of $20 million (equivalent to $25.1 million in 2024), it was constructed by Blythe Construction and Kimley-Horn. An interchange with the newly extended Morrisville Parkway (exit 64) opened to traffic on February 3, 2020.

=== Southern Wake Expressway ===
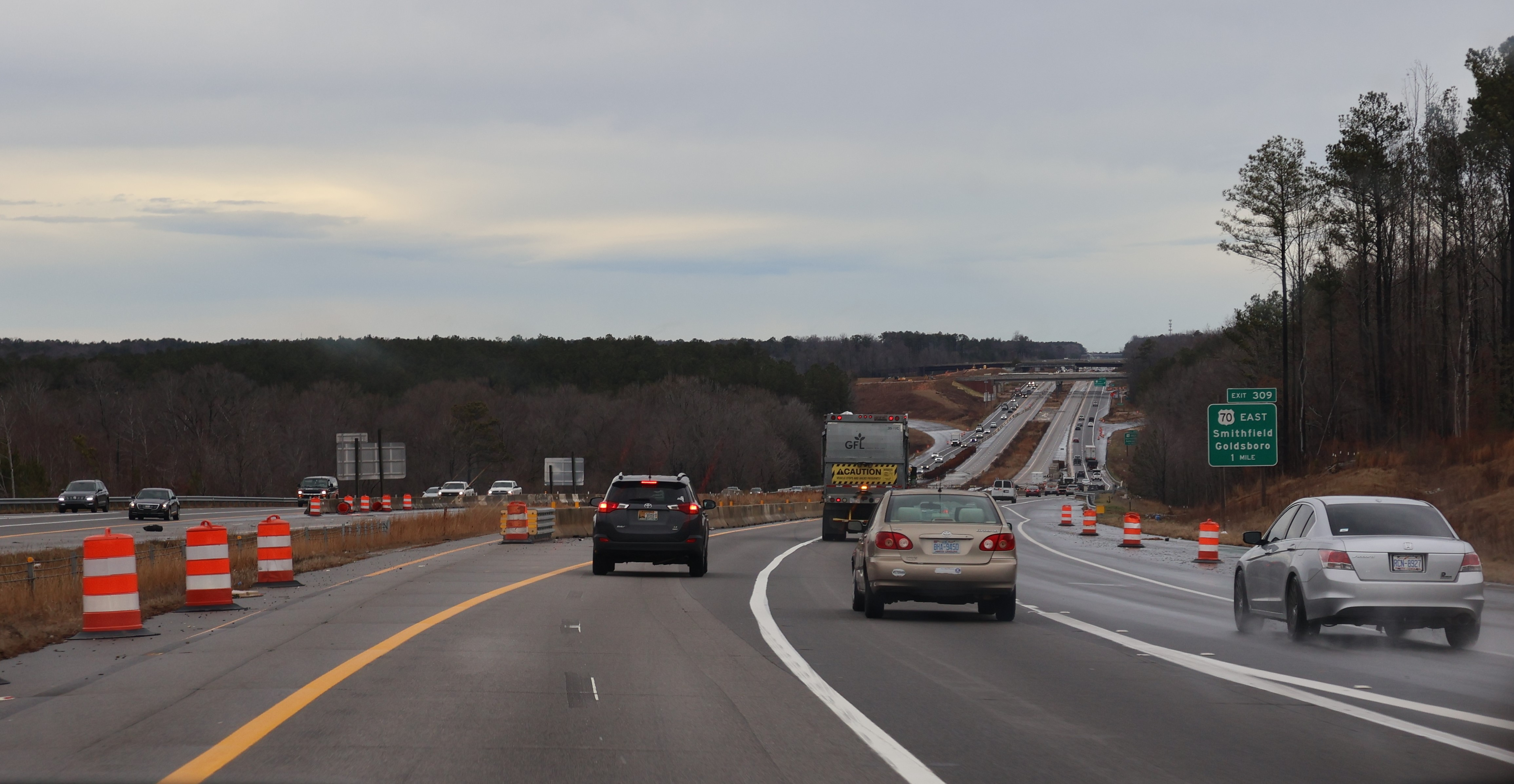
Construction of the I-40/US 70/NC 540 interchange in January 2023

The next 17.09 mi (27.50 km) segment, known as the Southern Wake Expressway, connects I-40/I-42 near Garner with NC 55 in Apex. Planning for the route began in the 1990s, when it was identified as the Orange Route by NCDOT. Because the route would cross the habitat for the endangered dwarf wedgemussel, The US Fish and Wildlife Service asked for routes north of the Orange Route to be considered as a way to provide a shorter option, possibly minimizing impacts to natural resources. In September 2010, a new map showed several other routes, including the controversial Red Route, which many Garner-area residents protested in a December 2010 meeting; a total of 3,000 signatures on petitions opposed the route as well.

After two years, the General Assembly chose to permit studying the Red Corridor, which meant possible routes could once again be considered. Documents released on September 9, 2013, changed the 30-mile (48 km) project from two phases to a single project, with construction expected to begin in 2018 and be completed by 2022. Public meetings were scheduled in October 2013 for "Complete 540".

In April 2016, NCDOT announced that Detailed Study Alternative was selected as the preferred alternative for the project. The route goes from west to east and combines the proposed orange, green (southern portion), mint, and green (northern portion) corridor segments. The portion of NC 540 from NC 55 to I-40 was scheduled to be open to traffic in 2023 but was later pushed to Spring 2024. After further delays, the extension was set to have its official ribbon-cutting and opening on August 27, 2024. However, Tropical Storm Debby, reportedly, caused significant erosion along the unopened portion of the expressway further delaying the opening to vehicles. NCDOT later announced on September 4, 2024, a revised official opening date of September 25, 2024, with its official ribbon-cutting to be held on September 24, 2024. The extension opened to traffic at 6 a.m. that day. NCDOT certified NC 540 designation, for the new extension, on October 3, 2024.

== Future ==
A plan approved by the Raleigh city council in November 2013 includes asking for tolls for the existing highway in order to widen it to eight lanes by 2035 or 2040. This would require both state and federal approval. As a temporary solution to increased traffic on the northern section, NCDOT has installed ramp meters on some onramps, the first ones in the state.

=== Triangle Expressway Southeast Extension ===
On August 21, 2021, the Eastern Wake Expressway, the final segment closing the loop to I-87/US 64/US 264 was scheduled to begin the bidding process in 2025 with construction not beginning until at least 2029. Public input over the growth and development of a 15,000-acre area of eastern Wake County along the lower Neuse River as well as the future southern loop of NC 540 was requested on June 23, 2023.

The process of completing the final segment was sped up after the N.C. Turnpike Authority (NCTA) was able to get a single environmental permit, allowing for utility work to begin. That coupled with strong local support and expected toll revenues moved the project up NCDOT's list of priorities and the bidding process for the segment began much earlier than anticipated in Summer 2023. The work was to be done in two sections; the first one would be from south of Rock Quarry Road northward to the I-540/I-87/US 64/US 264 interchange while the second one would be from I-40/US 70 (future I-42) to south of Rock Quarry Road. In September 2023, it was announced that Flatiron-Fred Smith Company Joint Venture had been awarded a $450 million contract to complete the first segment; S.T. Wooten-Branch Civil joint venture was awarded a $287 million contract for the second segment in October 2023. In December 2023, the Local Government Commission (LGC) approved an application by the NCTA for revenue bonds and a Transportation Infrastructure Finance & Innovation Act (TIFIA) loan through US-DOT to start construction. Construction began with a groundbreaking on May 16, 2024. Completion of the final segment is expected in 2028.

== Exit list ==
County	Location	mi	km	Exit	Destinations	Notes
Durham	Durham	0.0	0.0	1	I-40 – Raleigh, Durham, RTP	Signed as exits 1A (east) and 1B (west)
Wake	Raleigh	2.0	3.2	2	Aviation Parkway – RDU Airport	Signed as exits 2A (south) and 2B (north)
Wake	Raleigh	4.0	6.4	3	Lumley Road	
Wake	Raleigh	4.2	6.8	4	US 70 (Glenwood Avenue) – Raleigh, Durham	Signed as exits 4A (east) and 4B (west)
Wake	Raleigh	7.0	11.3	7	Leesville Road	
Wake		9.2	14.8	9	NC 50 (Creedmoor Road) – Creedmoor, Raleigh	
Wake	Raleigh	11.4	18.3	11	Six Forks Road	
Wake	Raleigh	13.8	22.2	14	Falls of Neuse Road	
Wake	Raleigh	16.8	27.0	16	US 1 (Capital Boulevard) – Raleigh, Wake Forest	
Wake	Raleigh	17.0	27.4	17	Triangle Town Boulevard	To Triangle Town Center
Wake	Raleigh	18.4	29.6	18	US 401 (Louisburg Road) – Louisburg, Raleigh	
Wake	Raleigh	20.2	32.5	20	Buffaloe Road	
Wake	Knightdale	24.6	39.6	24	US 64 Bus. – Raleigh, Knightdale	Signed eastbound as exits 24A (west) and 24B (east)
Wake	Knightdale	25.8	41.5	26	I-87 / US 64 / US 264 (Knightdale Bypass) – Raleigh, Wilson, Rocky Mount	Signed as exits 26A (west) and 26B (east). I-87 previously signed as I-495.
Wake	Knightdale	25.8	41.5	Route transition from I-540 to NC 540		
Wake	Knightdale	27.5	44.3	27	Poole Road	Future interchanges (proposed Triangle Expressway final phase); estimated completion in 2028
Wake		29.4	47.3	29	Auburn Knightdale Road	Future interchanges (proposed Triangle Expressway final phase); estimated completion in 2028
Wake		31.7	51.0	32	Rock Quarry Road	Future interchanges (proposed Triangle Expressway final phase); estimated completion in 2028
Wake		33.0	53.1	33	US 70	Future interchanges (proposed Triangle Expressway final phase); estimated completion in 2028
Wake		34.9	56.2	35	White Oak Road	Future interchanges (proposed Triangle Expressway final phase); estimated completion in 2028
Johnston		36.8	59.2	36	I-40 / I-42 east – Raleigh, Goldsboro, Wilmington	
Wake		39.2	63.1	39	NC 50 (Benson Road)	
Wake		43.2	69.5	43	Old Stage Road	Westbound exit opened November 22, 2024
Wake		45.3	72.9	45	US 401 (Fayetteville Road) – Fuquay-Varina, Garner	Signed as Fuquay-Varina (west) and Garner (east)
Wake		47	76	47	Bells Lake Road	Eastbound entrance and exit opened November 27, 2024
Wake	Holly Springs	50.6	81.4	50	Holly Springs Road	
Wake	Apex	53.6	86.3	54	NC 55 – Apex, Holly Springs, Fuquay-Varina	Signed eastbound as exits 54A (west) and 54B (east)
Wake	Apex	54.8	88.2	55	Veridea Parkway	
Wake		55.6	89.5	56	US 1 – Raleigh, Sanford	To Harris Lake; signed as exits 56A (north) and 56B (south)
Wake		56.6	91.1	57	South Salem Street	
Wake	Apex	59.4	95.6	59	US 64 – Apex, Pittsboro	To Jordan Lake; signed as exits 59A (east) and 59B (west)
Wake	Cary	61.9	99.6	62	Green Level West Road – Cary	
Wake	Cary	63.6	102.4	64	Morrisville Parkway	Opened on February 3, 2020
Wake	Cary	66.4	106.9	66	NC 55 – Cary, Durham	To USA Baseball; signed as exits 66A (east) and 66B (west)
Wake	Morrisville	68.2	109.8	67	NC 885 Toll north (Triangle Expressway) – Durham	Was known as Davis Drive before June 1, 2010; reopened December 8, 2011, as Toll NC 147 north; renamed June 30, 2022, as Toll NC 885 north
Wake	Morrisville	69.2	111.4	69	NC 54 – Chapel Hill, Cary	End of NC 540 portion of Triangle Expressway. Road continues as I-540 (see exit 1 above)
1.000 mi = 1.609 km; 1.000 km = 0.621 mi: Incomplete access; Route transition; Unopened
