= East Durham Historic District =

Historic district in North Carolina, United States

- U.S. National Register of Historic Places
- U.S. Historic district
- Location within North Carolina Location within the United States
- Location: Roughly bounded by Southern Rwy right-of-way, N. Guthrie Ave. Holloway St., Hyde Park Ave, S. Plum St. and Vale St., Durham, North Carolina
- Coordinates: 35°59′39″N 78°52′31″W
- Area: 226 acres (91 ha)
- Built: 1902
- Architect: Rose & Rose; Githins, Fred, et al.
- Architectural style: Queen Anne, Classical Revival, et al.
- MPS: Durham MRA
- NRHP reference No.: 04001393
- Added to NRHP: December 23, 2004

East Durham Historic District is a national historic district located at Durham, North Carolina. The district encompasses 731 contributing buildings and 1 contributing site (Barbee Graveyard) in a predominantly residential section of Durham. The buildings primarily date between about 1890 and 1955 and include notable examples of Classical Revival and Queen Anne architecture. Notable buildings include the Holloway Street School (1928), East Durham Junior High School (c. 1940), Advent Christian Church (1920s), Asbury Temple Methodist Church (1925), John Cheek House (1899), Community Groceries (1900), George Brown Grocery Store (1920), Seagroves Grocery Store (1915), and The People's Bank (1921).

It was listed on the National Register of Historic Places in 2004.
