= Research Triangle Park =

Research park in North Carolina, United States

Coordinates: 35°54′29″N 78°51′46″W

- Established: 1959
- Key people: Jonathan C. Pruitt, President and CEO of the Research Triangle Foundation of North Carolina
- Location: Research Triangle, North Carolina
- Interactive map of Research Triangle Park
- Website: RTP.org

Research Triangle Park (RTP) is the largest research park in the United States; it occupies 7,000 acres (2,833 ha) in North Carolina and hosts more than 300 companies and 65,000 workers. It is owned and managed by the Research Triangle Foundation of North Carolina, a private non-profit organization.

North Carolina's Research Triangle region is named for RTP, which sits within the geographic triangle formed by three nearby research universities: North Carolina State University, Duke University, and University of North Carolina at Chapel Hill.

The park is bounded by the cities of Raleigh, Durham and Chapel Hill and the communities of Morrisville and Cary. Most of its territory lies within Durham County, with about one-quarter in Wake County.

== Overview ==
Research Triangle Park is one of the most prominent high-tech research and development parks in the United States. It was created in 1959 by state and local governments, nearby universities, and local business interests. Karl Robbins bought the land where the park is now built. The park covers 7,000 acres (2,833 ha) and is situated in a pine forest with 22,500,000 square feet (2,090,318 m^{2}) of built space. The park is traversed by Interstate 40, the Durham Freeway and NC 540.

The park is home to more than 300 companies that employ 55,000 workers and an additional 10,000 contractors.

IBM has long been among the largest corporate tenants at RTP, with a four-building complex totaling 774,000 square feet. The park hosts one of GlaxoSmithKline's largest R&D centers with about 5,000 employees. Cisco Systems' campus in the park, with about 5,000 employees, is its second-largest location, after its Silicon Valley corporate headquarters. The National Institutes of Health has its National Institute of Environmental Health Sciences in the park and the city of Durham.

In August 2017, Scott Levitan was named the foundation's president and CEO, making him the 9th leader since the foundation was established. Levitan retired in October 2026.

The foundation announced the leadership change in July 2026, naming Jonathan C. Pruitt, who served as executive vice chancellor and chief operating officer (COO) for The University of Texas System, as its next president and CEO. Pruitt joined the foundation on Sept. 15, 2026.

== History ==
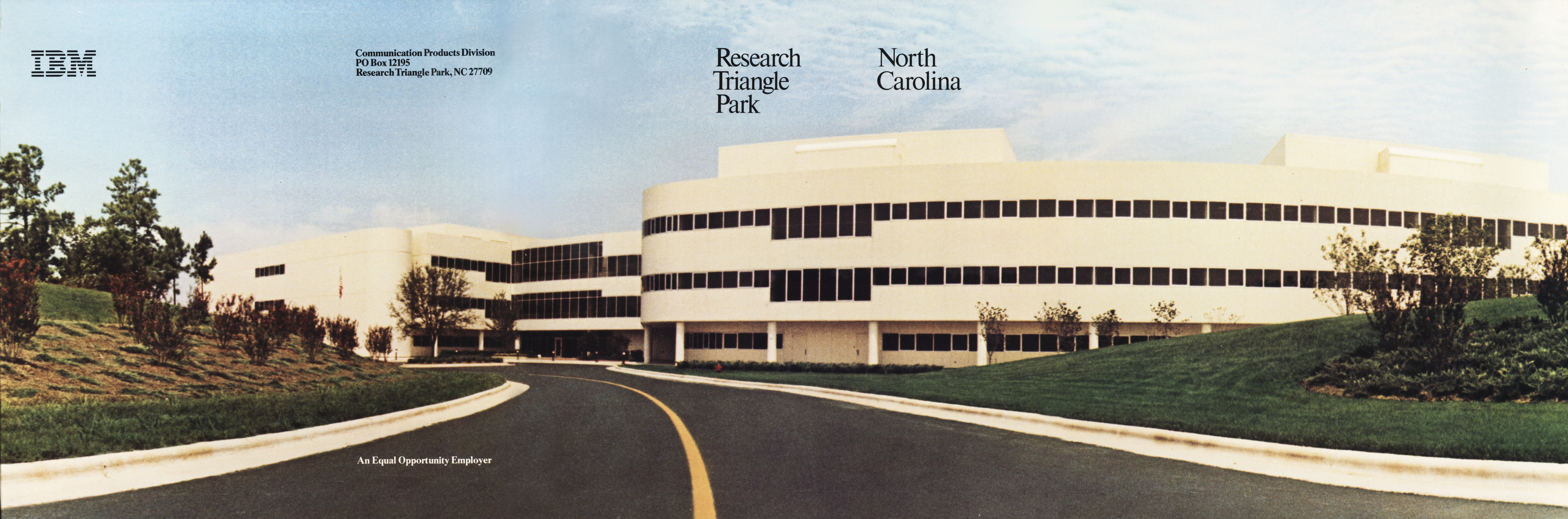
IBM's Research Triangle Park facility, pictured in around 1982

After World War II, North Carolina's economy was hurt as its agriculture, textile, and furniture industries lost market share. Academics at UNC, NCSU and Duke proposed a park to allow the universities to do research together, harness the area's strengths, and keep graduates in the state.

The "Research Triangle" name is first known to have been used by Romeo Guest in 1953. Guest began advocating the project after unsuccessfully attempting to bring pharmaceutical giant Merck to Aberdeen, North Carolina, in the early 1940s. The project was officially greenlit by Governor Luther Hodges in 1956, but the three universities were initially wary of the initiative. For his leadership in helping to create RTP, Hodges is credited with leading the transformation of North Carolina from one of the poorest states in the Union to one of its most prosperous.

Although RTP was initially envisioned as a for-profit business, its strategy shifted at the direction of Archibald "Archie" Davis, a former Wachovia Bank chairman, state senator, and president of the United States Chamber of Commerce, who switched to a non-profit model to purchase the RTP site, and successfully raised $1.425 million in donations from North Carolinians.

The surge in RTP's growth began in 1965, when IBM and the Department of Health, Education, and Welfare announced new facilities in the park. The latter move was attributed to the efforts of Governor Terry Sanford, an ally of President John F. Kennedy. From then until the late 2000s, the park averaged six new companies and 1,800 new employees per year.

IBM remained the largest employer at RTP for decades, with 11,000 workers at the site as of 2013. The RTP facility handled products including the IBM 1050 terminal, Selectric typewriters, PC and accounting operations, and BladeCenter servers.

In 1976, the three major area universities formed a consortium, the Triangle Universities Center for Advanced Studies (TUCASI), to develop joint research facilities and think tanks at RTP. This led to the foundation of the National Humanities Center, Microelectronics Center of North Carolina, the North Carolina Biotechnology Center, and the National Institute for Statistical Sciences.

In January 2002, IBM announced it will sell its desktop PC manufacturing operations in RTP to Sanmina-SCI, about 900 employees were affected, along with 80 in Greenock, Scotland.

In their article "The Growth of Research Triangle Park", Link and Scott posit that entrepreneurial culture and leadership contributed the most to its success as a cluster. Archie Davis promoted a culture of innovation and entrepreneurship by locating the park near universities, actively recruiting organizations (like the American Academy of Arts and Sciences), and used his vision to raise funding for the park.

Davis strongly believed that profits could not be the only driver for creating the park and that the betterment of the community should be the key goal. "The love of this state … was the motivation for the Research Triangle idea," he said. "Research Triangle is a manifestation of what North Carolina is all about." Research Triangle Park remains a nonprofit.

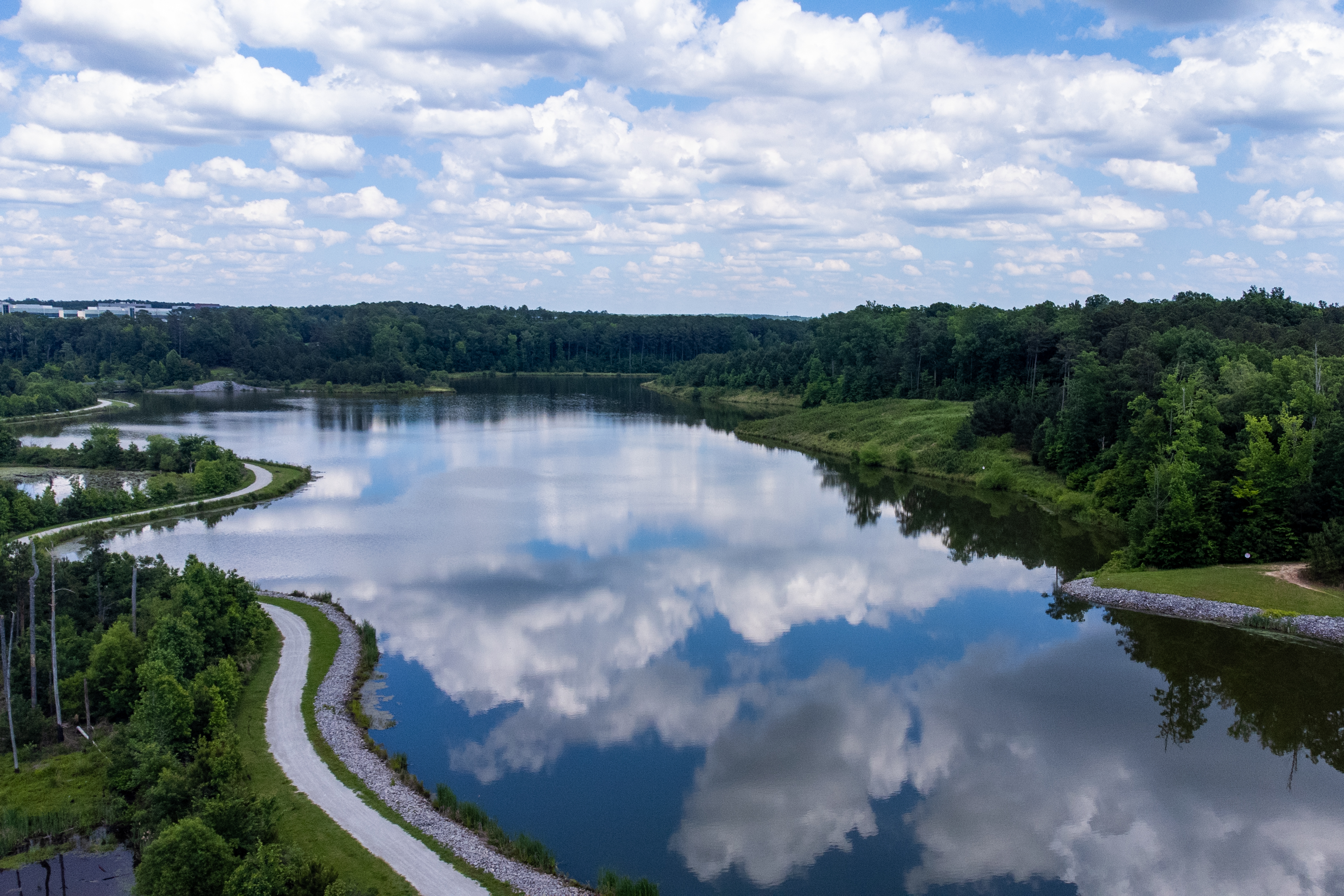
Lake Betz at Research Triangle Park

== Local government ==
The park is an unincorporated area, and state law prohibits municipalities from annexing areas within the park. Some local government functions are served by the Durham-Wake Counties Research and Production Service District, a special tax district created in 1986 that is conterminous with the park, wherein the property tax rate is limited to 10 cents per $100 valuation. The park has special zoning as a Research Applications District in the Wake County portion, and a Scientific Research Park in the Durham County portion. As of October 2012, both zoning areas are in the process of being revised to allow higher density development. The zoning changes are coupled with legislative changes allowing for Urban Research Service Districts (URSD) within the Park, which can include a mix of retail and residential usages. The URSDs have the power to levy taxes at the same rate as a neighboring city. Fire protection was previously provided by several volunteer departments until their mergers with nearby municipal departments. Currently, the City of Durham Fire Department provides fire protection to RTP and nearby unincorporated areas located in Durham County, and the Town of Morrisville Fire Department serves the portion located within Wake County.

The Research Triangle Foundation operates several subsidiaries within the park. These include: the Frontier RTP startup campus, Boxyard RTP, and Hub RTP. Frontier RTP first opened as a free coworking space in a single building in January 2015. Since its inception, the Foundation has expanded the Frontier RTP concept to three additional buildings, creating an affordable campus for growing tech, life science and nonprofit organizations; as of 2021, 100 of the Park's 300 companies are housed in the Frontier campus.

== Redevelopment ==
On October 1, 2015, Bob Geolas, former president and CEO of the Research Triangle Foundation, announced RTP's plans for a $50,000,000 redevelopment involving the formation of "Park Center." That included $20,000,000 from Durham County, $10,000,000 from the Durham-Wake Counties Research and Production Service District and $20,000,000 as a result of land purchases and site work provided by the Research Triangle Foundation of North Carolina. The redevelopment plans also include exploring partnerships with regional transit groups. The hope of the Research Triangle Foundation is to broaden public transportation to and from the area.

=== Hub RTP ===
In 2019, the Research Triangle Foundation announced "Hub RTP" as the project's new name. The 100 acres (40 ha) site broke ground in September 2020 and will include two million square feet of office, residential, retail and hotel space, as well as 14 acres of green space.

=== Boxyard RTP ===
In March 2019, RTF announced plans to construct Boxyard RTP, an 15,000-square-foot shipping container complex of retail, dining, and other amenities. The $9M project, which is set on 12 acres (4.9 ha) of the Frontier RTP campus, delayed its launch for a year because of the impacts of the COVID-19 pandemic and soft-launched in June 2021 with a few of the planned tenants opening for business in the days following. The complex held its grand opening on November 18, 2021, with several anchor tenants open for business. Initial tenants include restaurants, a brewery, a cocktail bar, a coffee shop, a beauty shop, a CBD vendor, and an escape room. The complex also features a dog park named the Barkyard RTP, pop-up yoga classes, live music, and both standalone and roof-mounted heaters in the outdoor pavilion. Boxyard RTP is inspired by a similar development called The Boxyard Tulsa, located in downtown Tulsa's East Village district.

== See also ==
- Megasite
- Vulcan Elements

== Bibliography ==
- Link, Albert N. (1995). A Generosity of Spirit: The Early History of the Research Triangle Park. Research Triangle Park: Research Triangle Foundation of North Carolina. ISBN 978-0-9648051-0-1. OCLC 33045964.
- Link, Albert N. (2002). From Seed to Harvest: The Growth of the Research Triangle Park. Research Triangle Park: Research Triangle Foundation of North Carolina. ISBN 978-0-9648051-1-8. OCLC 50694901.
- McCorkle, Mac. History and the 'New Economy' Narrative: The Case of Research Triangle Park and North Carolina's Economic Development Journal of the Historical Society 12.4 (2012): 479-525. Argues the old industries in the state promoted the Park.
