= Morrisville, North Carolina =

- Town
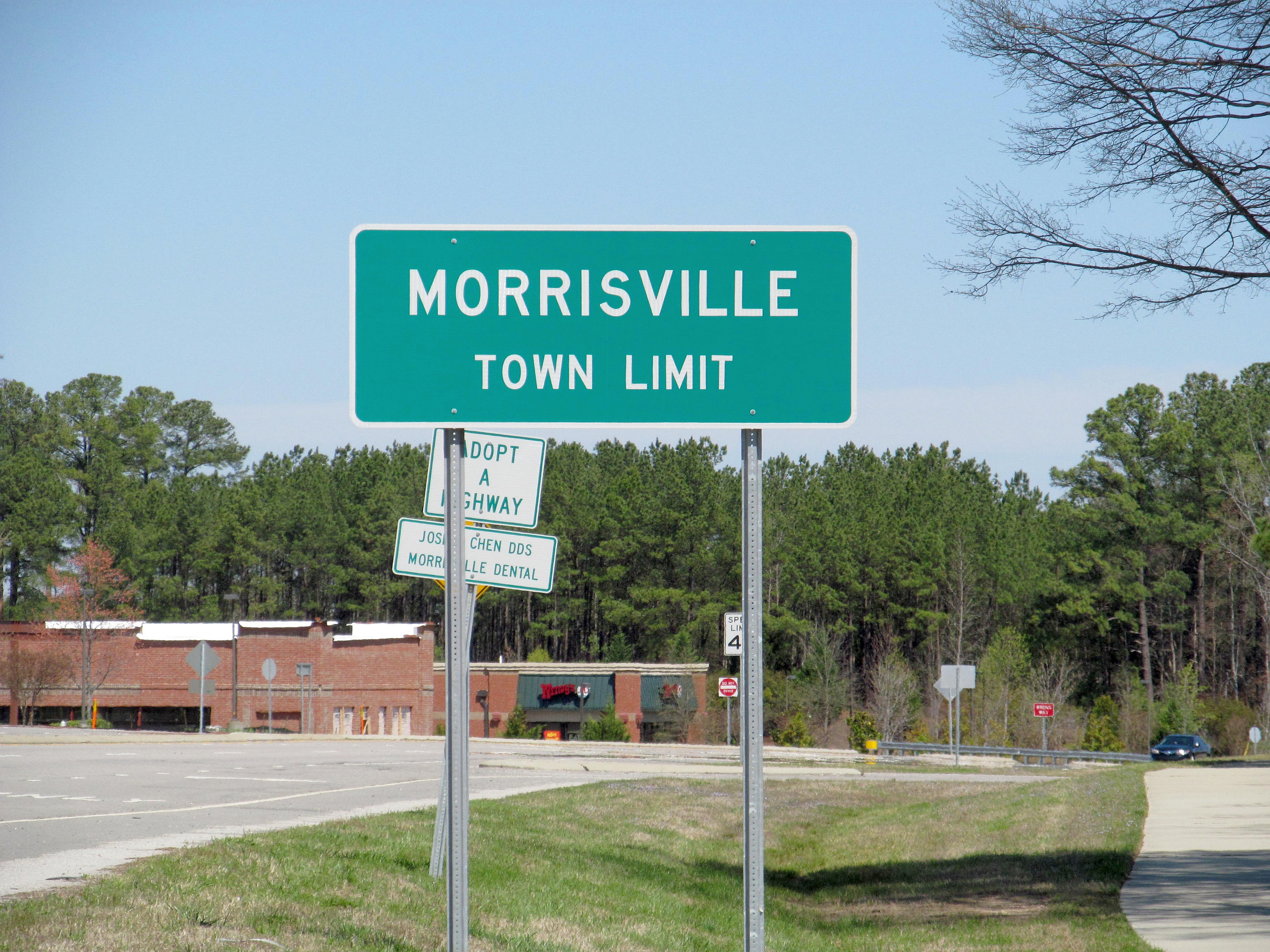
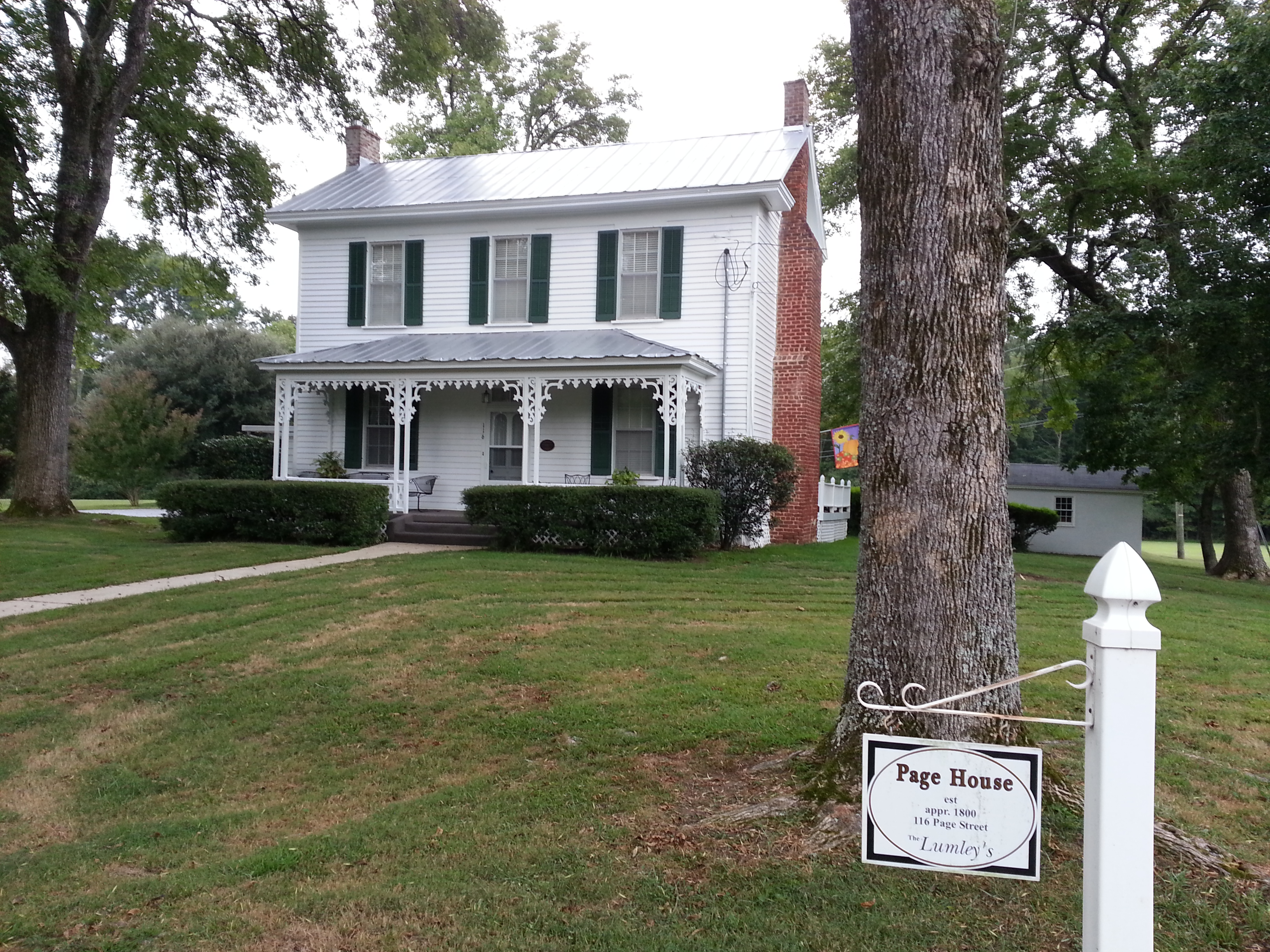
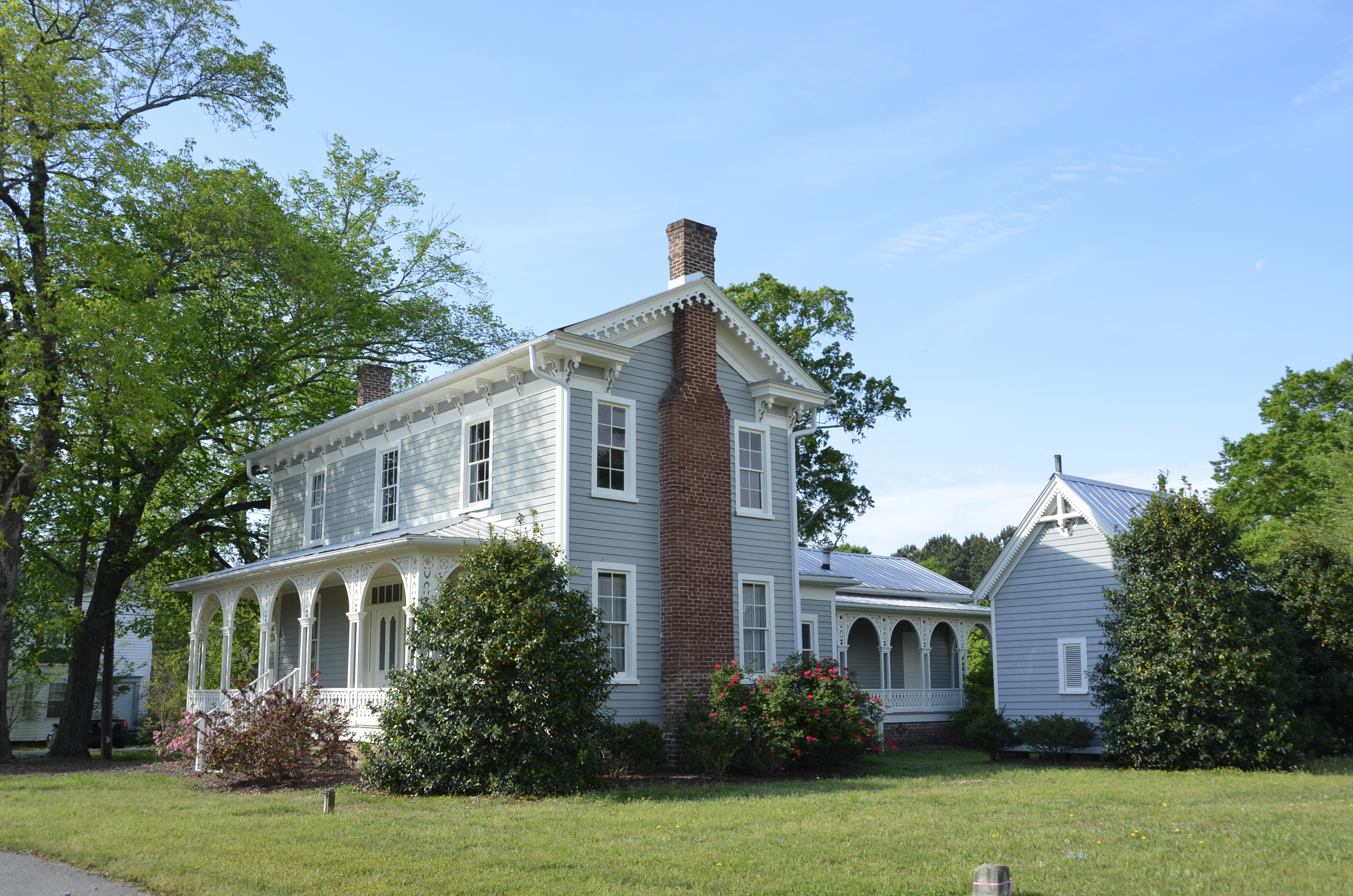
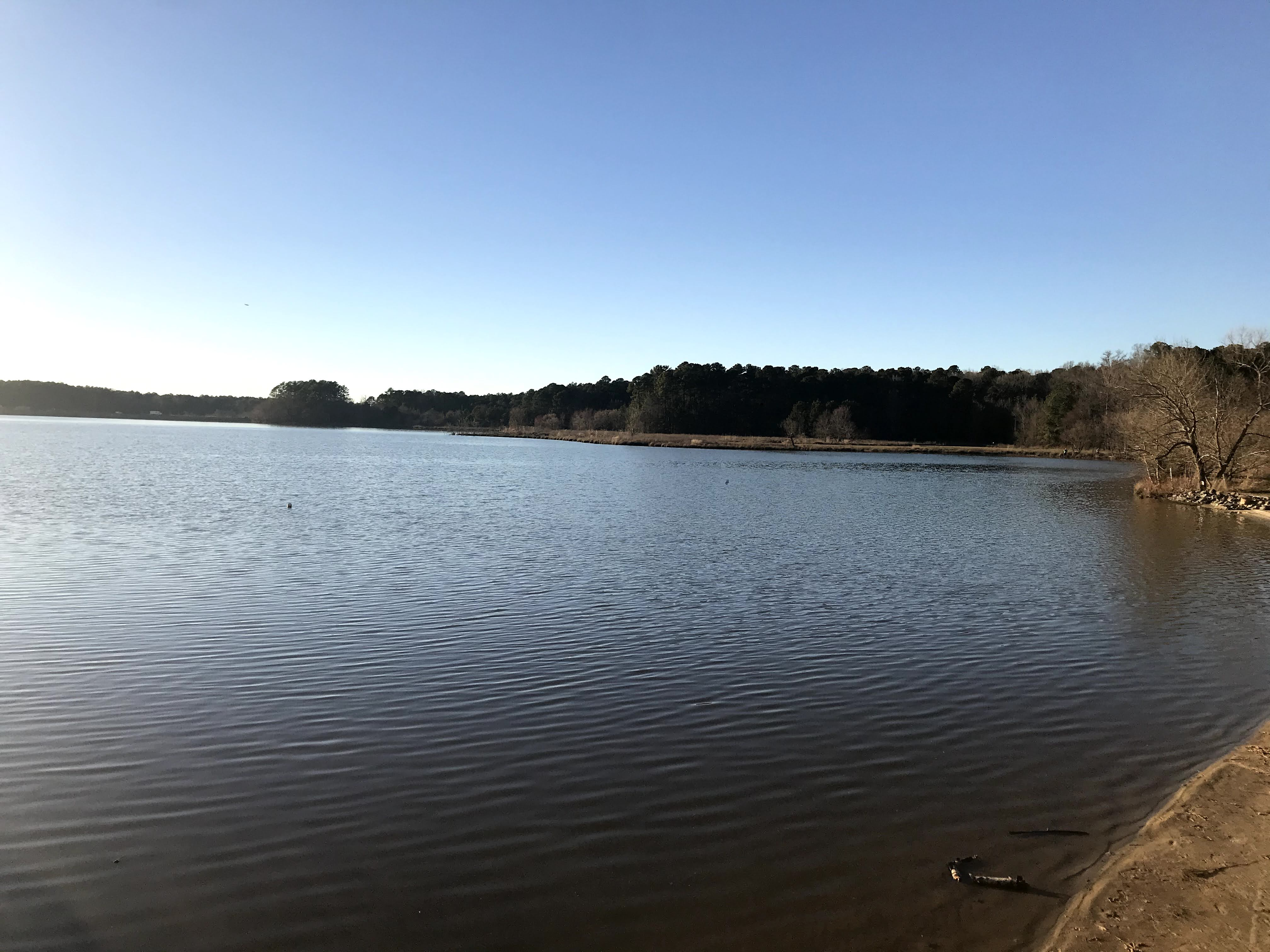
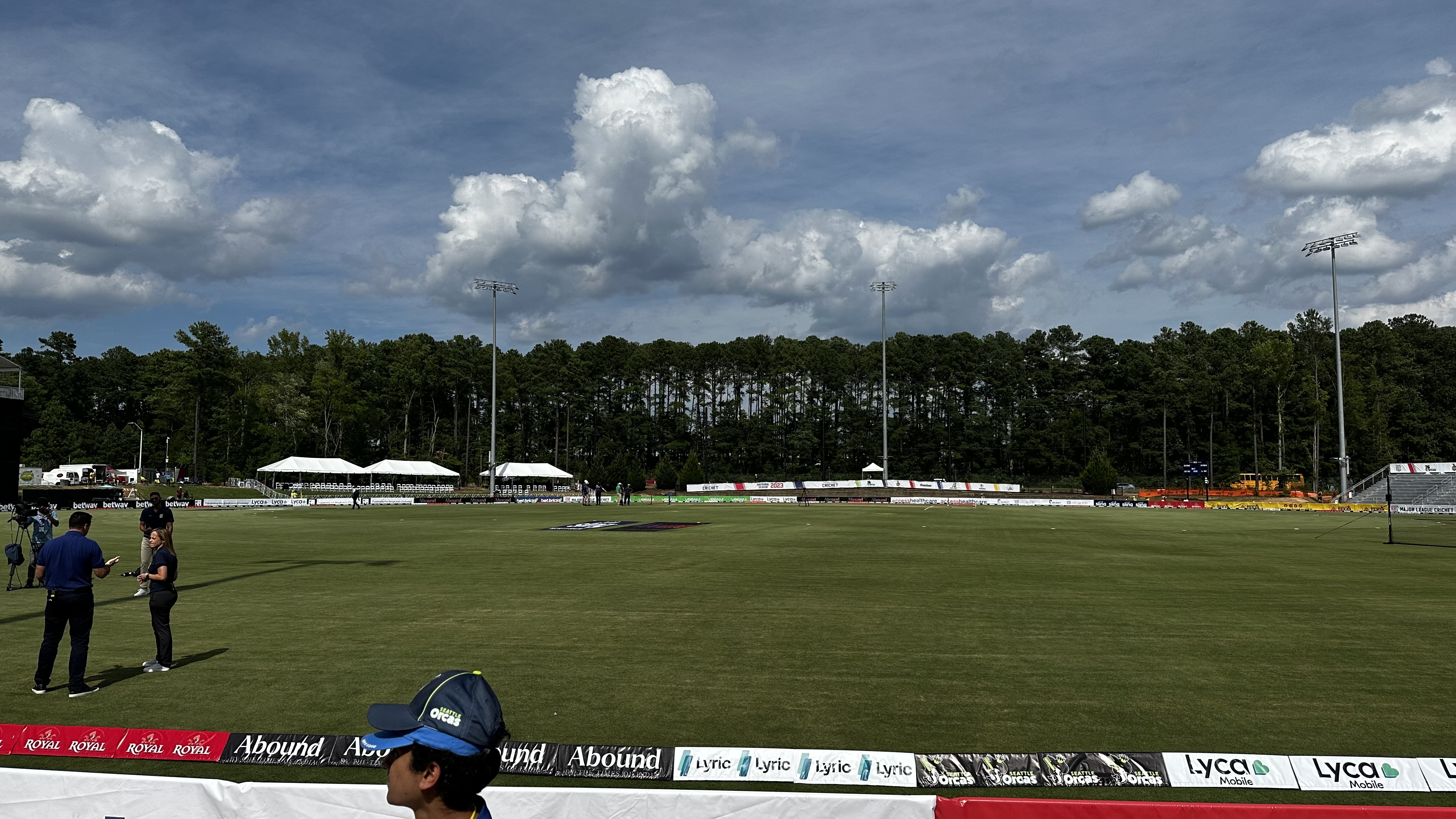
- Morrisville town limit sign Williamson Page House Pugh House Lake Crabtree Church Street Park

- Flag Seal Logo
- Motto: "Live Connected. Live Well."
- Interactive map of Morrisville, North Carolina
- Location within North Carolina Location within the United States
- Coordinates: 35°48′57″N 78°50′21″W
- Country: United States
- State: North Carolina
- Counties: Wake, Durham
- Founded: 1852
- Incorporated: March 3, 1875

Government
  - Type: Council-manager government
  - Body: Morrisville Town Council
  - Mayor: T.J. Cawley (Ind.)

Area
  - Total: 8.89 sq mi (23.02 km^{2})
  - Land: 8.83 sq mi (22.86 km^{2})
  - Water: 0.062 sq mi (0.16 km^{2})
- Elevation: 299 ft (91 m)

Population (2020)
  - Total: 29,630
  - Density: 3,360/sq mi (1,296/km^{2})
- Time zone: UTC−5 (Eastern (EST))
  - Summer (DST): UTC−4 (EDT)
- ZIP codes: 27519, 27560
- Area code(s): 919 & 984
- FIPS code: 37-44520
- GNIS feature ID: 2406198
- Website: morrisvillenc.gov

Morrisville is a town located primarily in Wake County, North Carolina, United States (a small portion extends into neighboring Durham County). The population was 29,630 at the 2020 census. Located midway between Raleigh and Durham, Morrisville is part of the Research Triangle metropolitan region. The operational headquarters of Lenovo is located in the municipal limits.

== History ==
The area was originally named in 1852 after Jeremiah Morris. Morris donated land to the North Carolina Railroad for a depot, water tower, and other buildings. The town continued to grow as a result of the rail line and its location at the intersection of roads leading to Chapel Hill, Raleigh, and Hillsborough.

On April 13, 1865, in the Battle of Morrisville, United States cavalry under the command of Gen. Judson Kilpatrick skirmished with the retreating Confederate armies at Morrisville Station. The Confederate troops were successful in evacuating their remaining supplies and wounded to the west toward Greensboro, but Gen. William Tecumseh Sherman's cavalry forced the Confederates to leave the train behind and retreat toward Durham and the eventual surrender of the largest Confederate force of the war at Bennett Place.

The town was officially chartered in 1875 but was disincorporated in 1933. Eventually the town charter was restored in 1947.

Morrisville History (as listed on historical marker):

Morrisville Station: "On April 16, 1865, Union cavalry under the command of General William T. Sherman, captured Raleigh and pursued the retreating Confederate cavalry west along the railroad. Rearguard skirmishes erupted at points along the Hillsborough Road until the combatants reached Morrisville. Using cavalry and artillery, Union forces attacked a Confederate train loaded with supplies and wounded. Before withdrawing, the Confederate cavalry repelled the attack long enough to allow the railcars of wounded to escape while abandoning the supplies. This was the last major cavalry engagement in Sherman's campaign. The next night, a courier from the Confederate commander, General Joseph E. Johnston, rode into the Union camp at Morrisville with a truce proposal. Subsequent negotiations between Johnston and Sherman led to the largest Confederate surrender of the Civil War at the Bennett Farm in Durham on April 26."

The history marker notes it was given in memory of Commissioner C.T. Moore.

On December 13, 1994, Flagship Airlines Flight 3379 crashed in Morrisville, killing 15 of the 20 people on board.

== Geography ==
According to the United States Census Bureau, the town has a total area of 8.3 square miles (21.5 km^{2}), of which 8.3 square miles (21.4 km^{2}) is land and 0.04 square miles (0.1 km^{2}), or 0.62%, is water.

Morrisville is located in the northeast central region of North Carolina, where the North American Piedmont and Atlantic Coastal Plain regions meet. This area is known as the "Fall Line" because it marks the elevation inland at which waterfalls begin to appear in creeks and rivers. As a result, most of Morrisville features gently rolling hills that slope eastward toward the state's flat coastal plain. Its central Piedmont location situates the county approximately three hours west of Atlantic Beach by car and four hours east of the Great Smoky Mountains.

The central core of Morrisville is located along the upper portion of Crabtree Creek, which then feeds into Lake Crabtree, located in the southeastern part of the town.

=== Climate ===
Morrisville enjoys a moderate subtropical climate, with moderate temperatures in the spring, fall, and winter. Summers are typically hot with high humidity. Winter highs generally range in the low 50s°F (10 to 13 °C) with lows in the low-to-mid 30s°F (-2 to 2 °C), although an occasional 60 °F (16 °C) or warmer winter day is not uncommon. This is canceled out, however, with several days where highs do not get out of the 30s. There are usually one or two substantial snowfalls per winter, occurring mainly in February. Spring and fall days usually reach the low-to-mid 70s°F (low 20s°C), with lows at night in the lower 50s°F (10 to 14 °C). Summer daytime highs often reach the upper 80s to low 90s°F (29 to 35 °C). The rainiest months are July and August.

== Demographics ==
Historical population
Census	Pop.	Note	%±
1880	165		—
1890	149		−9.7%
1900	100		−32.9%
1910	151		51.0%
1920	166		9.9%
1930	161		−3.0%
1950	221		—
1960	222		0.5%
1970	209		−5.9%
1980	251		20.1%
1990	1,022		307.2%
2000	5,208		409.6%
2010	18,576		256.7%
2020	29,630		59.5%
2025 (est.)	32,466	▲	9.6%
U.S. Decennial Census

=== 2020 census ===
As of the 2020 census, Morrisville had a population of 29,630. The median age was 33.9 years. 27.3% of residents were under the age of 18 and 7.0% of residents were 65 years of age or older. For every 100 females there were 98.2 males, and for every 100 females age 18 and over there were 96.8 males age 18 and over.

100.0% of residents lived in urban areas, while 0.0% lived in rural areas.

There were 11,104 households and 6,781 families in Morrisville. Of all households, 44.4% had children under the age of 18 living in them, 55.8% were married-couple households, 17.8% were households with a male householder and no spouse or partner present, and 21.3% were households with a female householder and no spouse or partner present. About 24.5% of all households were made up of individuals and 4.2% had someone living alone who was 65 years of age or older.

There were 11,757 housing units, of which 5.6% were vacant. The homeowner vacancy rate was 1.3% and the rental vacancy rate was 6.6%.

Morrisville racial composition
Race	Number	Percentage
White (non-Hispanic)	10,074	34.0%
Black or African American (non-Hispanic)	2,880	9.72%
Native American	80	0.27%
Asian	13,700	46.24%
Pacific Islander	5	0.02%
Other/Mixed	1,177	3.97%
Hispanic or Latino	1,714	5.78%

=== 2010 census ===
As of the 2010 census there were 18,576 people, 7,641 households, and 4,752 families residing in the town. The population density was 2,237.7 inhabitants per square mile (864.0/km^{2}). There were 8,357 housing units at an average density of 1,006.9 units per square mile (388.8 units/km^{2}). Known as North Carolina's "little India" by locals, Morrisville has become one of the most diverse towns in the state particularly due to the expansion of the technology industry. The racial makeup of the town was 54.0% White, 12.9% African American, 0.4% Native American, 27.2% Asian, 2.0% from some other race, and 3.4% from two or more races. Hispanic or Latino of any race were 5.9% of the population.

There were 7,641 households, out of which 37.1% had children under the age of 18 living with them. 50.3% of all households were headed by married couples living together, 8.9% had a female householder with no husband present, and 37.8% were non-families. 30.0% of all households were made up of individuals, and 2.5% had someone living alone who was 65 years of age or older. The average household size was 2.43, and the average family size was 3.11.

In the town, the population was spread out, with 27.0% under the age of 18, 6.0% from 18 to 24, 44.4% from 25 to 44, 18.4% from 45 to 64, and 4.3% who were 65 years of age or older. The median age was 32.5 years. For every 100 females, there were 96.7 males. For every 100 females age 18 and over, there were 93.2 males.

=== Income and poverty ===
In 2017, the median income for a household in the town was $95,763. Males had a median income of $59,982 versus $44,729 for females. The per capita income for the town was $43,054. About 3.4% of families and 4.6% of the population were below the poverty line, including 4.1% of those under age 18 and 13.0% of those age 65 or over.

== Economy ==
Morrisville's location adjacent to the Research Triangle Park, Raleigh-Durham International Airport, and Interstate 40 makes it an attractive location for offices, light industry and hotels. Companies based in Morrisville include Oracle, Syneos Health and Lenovo (operational headquarters).

Prior to its disestablishment, Midway Airlines had its headquarters in Morrisville.

The Morrisville Chamber of Commerce serves as the economic development arm for the town.

=== Employers ===
The computer technology, clinical trial and telecommunications industries have strong presence in the area. Major employers in 2019 included:

- Catalent Pharma Solutions
- ChannelAdvisor
- Credit Suisse
- Fujifilm Diosynth Biotechnologies
- Labcorp
- Lenovo
- Metabolon
- NetApp
- Oracle
- PPD, Inc.
- Spectrum
- TrialCard Inc
- UNC Rex Healthcare
- Worldwide Clinical Trials

== Arts and culture ==
The Morrisville Christian Church, Williamson Page House, and Pugh House are listed on the National Register of Historic Places.

== Parks and recreation ==
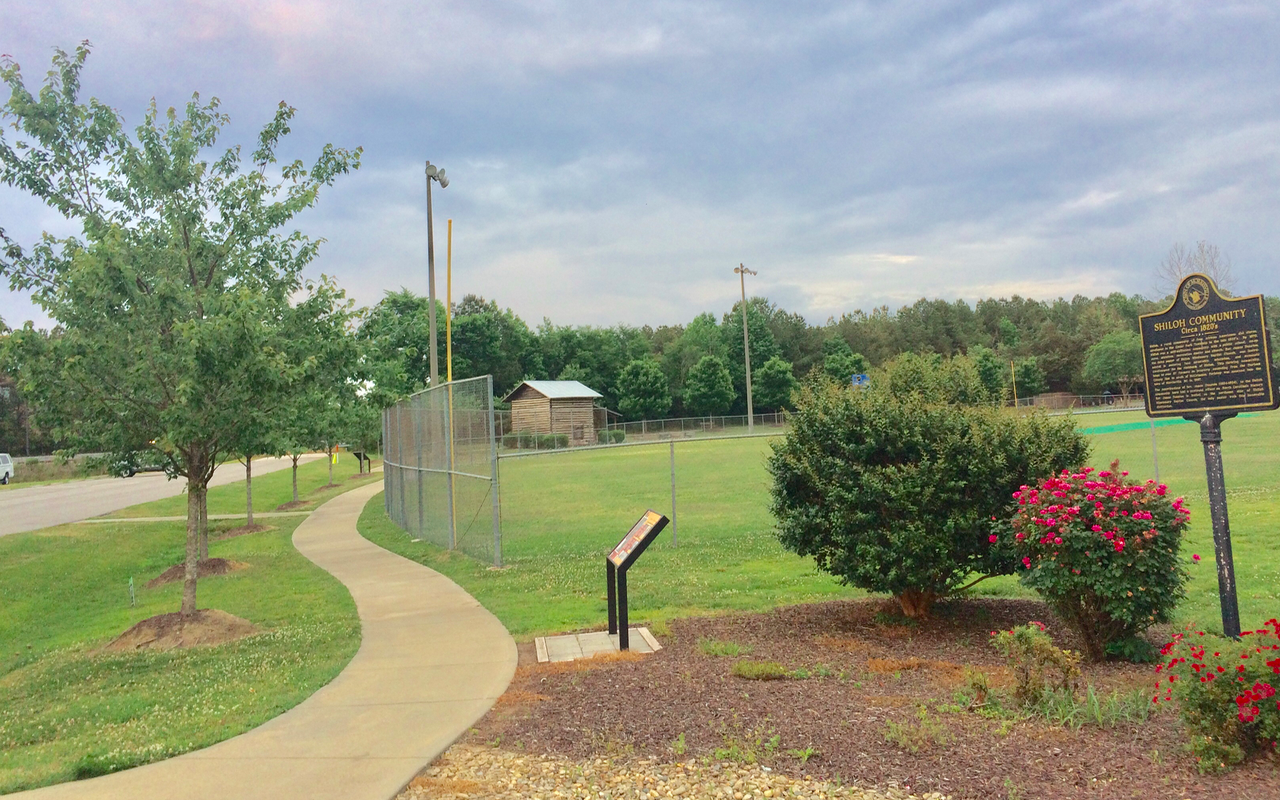
Shiloh Park

Morrisville is home to eight parks, two community centers, four greenways and a fitness center. Morrisville has several youth sports groups, such as youth basketball, baseball, softball, soccer, and cricket.

Name	Size	Notes
Morrisville Community Park	35-acre (140,000 m^{2})	Includes Hatcher Creek greenway in addition to rentable shelters, athletic fields, gazebo and picnic shelters
Shiloh Community Park & Luther Green Center	8-acre (32,000 m^{2})	Includes athletic field, picnic shelters, basketball court and playground
Crabtree Creek Nature Park	37-acre (150,000 m^{2})	Wooded and wetland site with a multi-purpose field
Ruritan Park	0.5-acre (2,000 m^{2})	Includes a gazebo, open areas, and sand volleyball courts. Owned by Ruritan Club and maintained by town.
Indian Creek Greenway and Trailhead	17-acre (69,000 m^{2})	Includes two picnic shelters, a playground, restrooms, and a 1.8-mile trail
Cedar Fork District Park	34-acre (140,000 m^{2})	Includes eight multi-purpose fields
Church Street Park	25-acre (100,000 m^{2})	Includes a cricket pitch and tennis courts.
Northwest Park	5-acre (20,000 m^{2})	Open seating and compact playground surrounded by a walking path
Lake Crabtree County Park	250-acre (1,000,000 m^{2}) park 520-acre (2,100,000 m^{2}) lake	Includes boating facilities, trails, playground, and picnic shelters.
Raleigh-Durham International Airport Observation Park		Includes observation platform and picnic area.
Cedar Fork Community Center	6-acre (24,000 m^{2})	Includes classrooms, gym, and field shared with Cedar Fork Elementary.
Morrisville Aquatics and Fitness Center	5-acre (20,000 m^{2})	Includes gym, pools, tennis courts, and racquetball court.

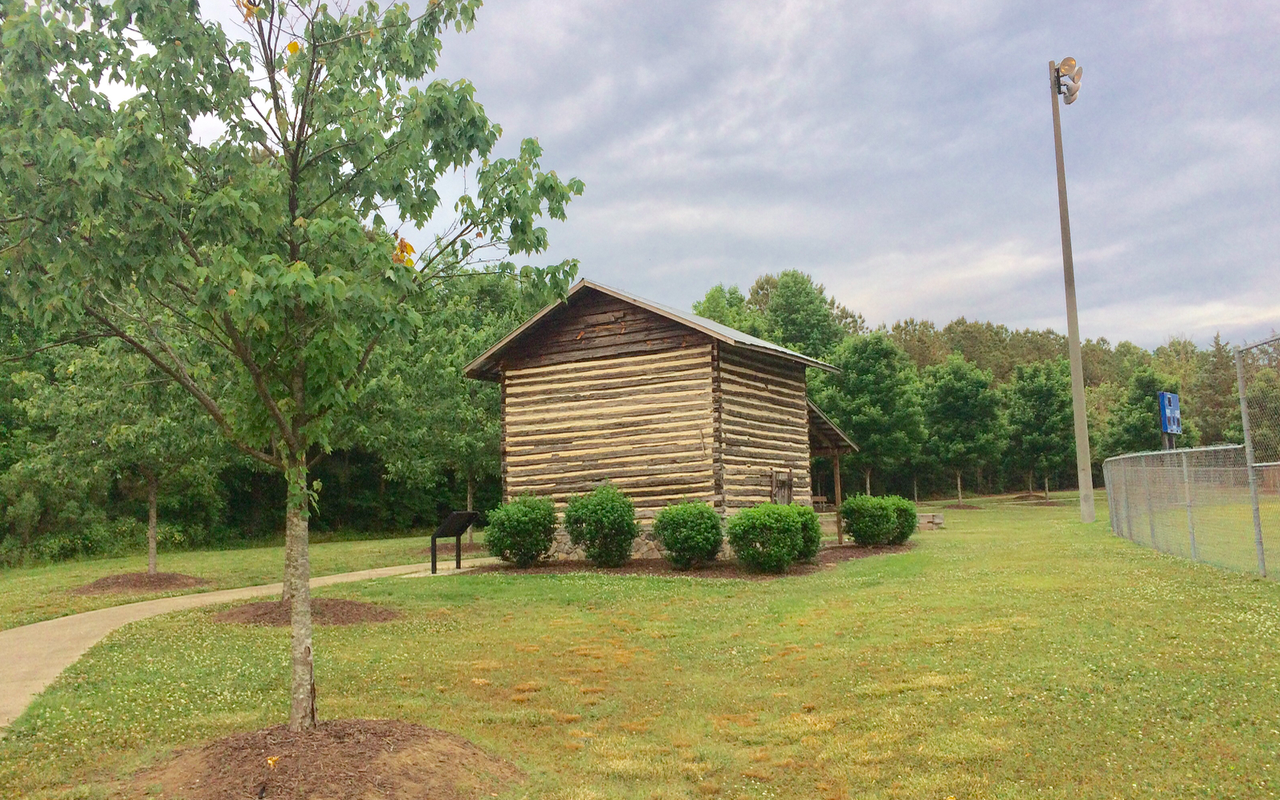
Shiloh Park

== Government ==
Morrisville operates under the council–manager form of government. The citizens elect a mayor and town council as the town's governing body. After each municipal election, the town council selects a mayor pro tem. The town manager, Martha Paige, is appointed by the council to serve as the chief operating officer administering all municipal affairs. The current mayor is TJ Cawley and the mayor pro tem is Satish Garimella. Morrisville Council members include Steve Rao, Vicki Scroggins-Johnson, Satish Garimella, Anne Robotti, and Donna Fender.

The North Carolina State Board of Dental Examiners has its headquarters in Morrisville.

== Infrastructure ==
=== Transportation ===
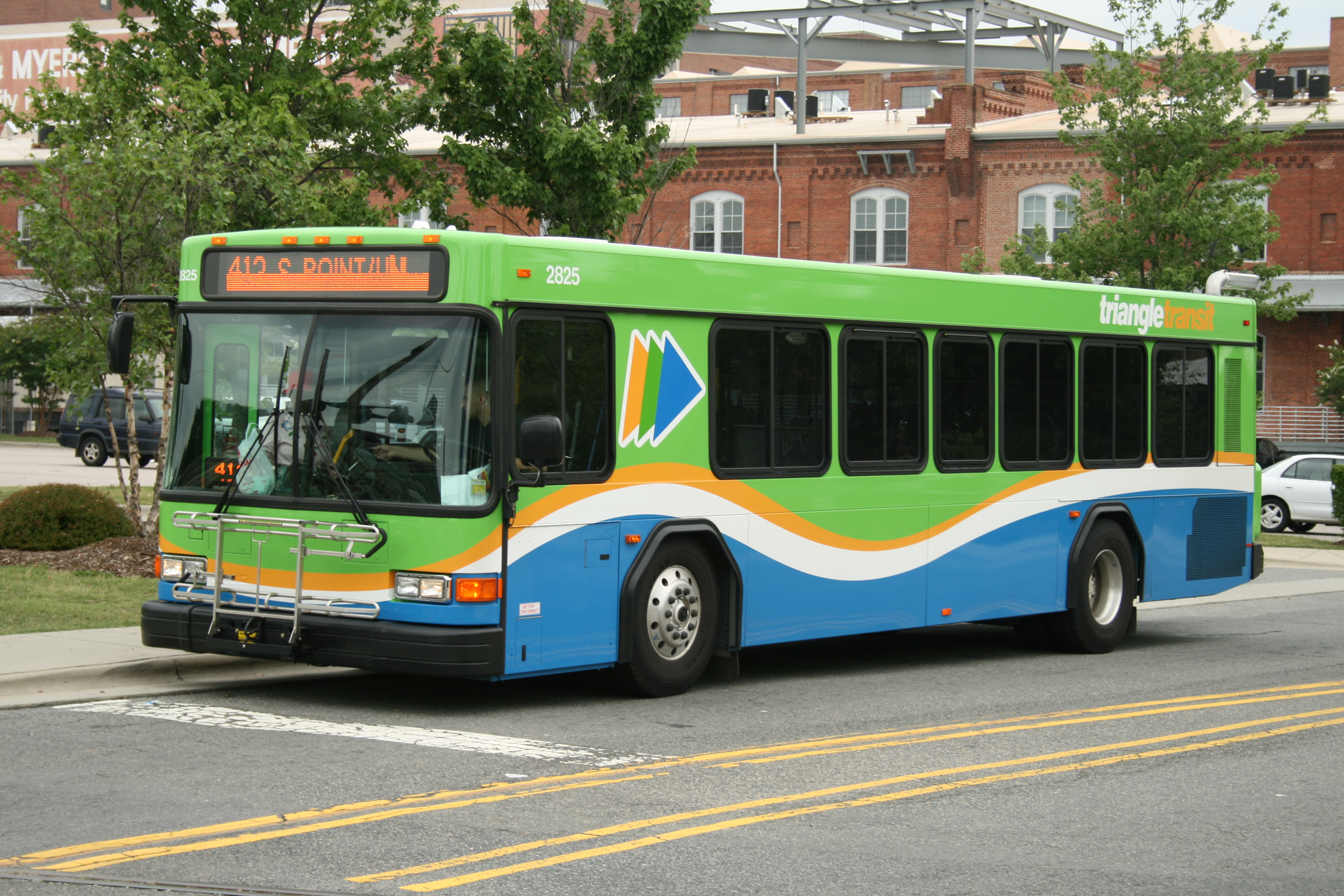
Triangle Transit

GoTriangle operates buses that serve the region and connect to municipal bus systems in Raleigh, Durham, Cary, and Chapel Hill. The Morrisville Smart Shuttle, operated by GoCary, serves the town with on-demand fare-free transit. The North Carolina Railroad passes through the town. Raleigh-Durham International Airport is located in northwestern Wake county on I-40, just to the north of Morrisville.

- NC 54 is a major highway that goes through town and provides easy access to Cary, Raleigh, Durham and Chapel Hill.
- I-40 runs through the eastern part of the town.
- I-540 / NC 540 serves the Morrisville area and is located to the west of the town. The highway offers access to I-40, North Raleigh, RDU airport and eastern Wake County.
- NC 147 is located in the northern part of town and provides easy access to Durham.

=== Utilities ===
Water and wastewater services are provided by the Town of Cary. Cary sources water from Jordan Lake. Electricity is provided by Duke Energy and Natural Gas is provided by Dominion Energy. Solid waste collection is contracted by the town to GFL Environmental.

=== Downtown ===
In September 2025, Morrisville broke ground on the site of a planned 25-acre high-density town center. The district will include the town's existing historic buildings, dog park, library, and Indian Creek Trailhead and Park as well as residential, office, retail, and civic facilities. The first phase is scheduled to open in 2027.

== Education ==
The overwhelming majority of the municipality, in Wake County, is in the Wake County Public School System.

The small portion in Durham County is in the Durham Public Schools school district.

== Notable people ==
- David Ray Boggs, former NASCAR driver
- Hill Carrow, sports tourism executive
- Alvin Kallicharran, former West Indies cricket team cricketer
- Tom Murry, politician, attorney, and pharmacist
- Mabel Pugh (1891–1986), art teacher, painter, woodblock printmaker and illustrator
- Kristof Robinson (aka Flula Borg), performer
- Vic Sorrell, former Major League Baseball pitcher
