= Stephen J. Benkovic =

American chemist

Stephen James Benkovic
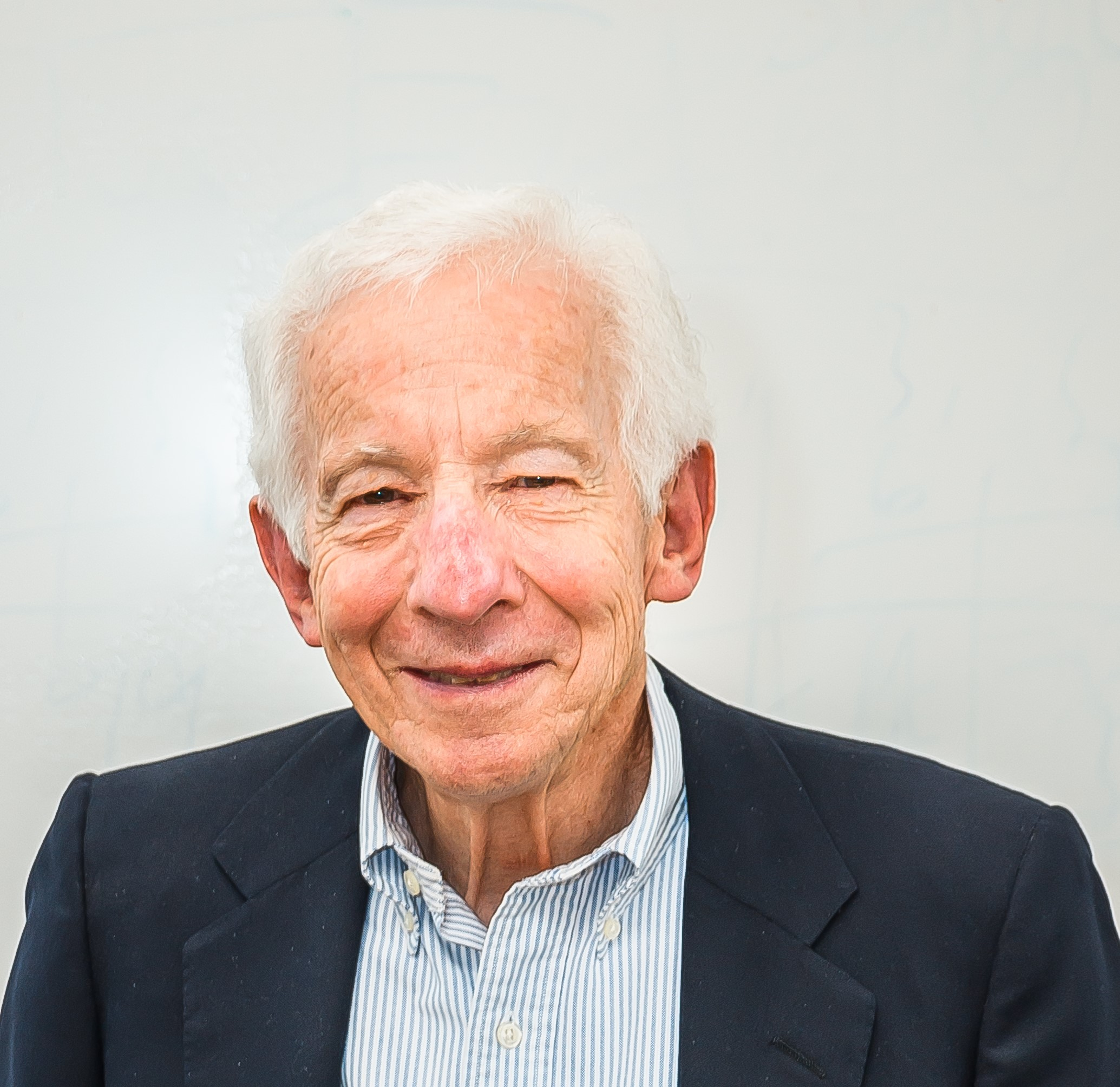
- Born: April 20, 1938 (age 88); Orange, New Jersey, U.S.
- Education: Lehigh University, Cornell University, University of California, Santa Barbara
- Awards: Pfizer Award in Enzyme Chemistry (1977); National Medal of Science (2009); NAS Award in Chemical Sciences (2011)
- Scientific career
- Fields: mechanistic enzymology, biochemistry
- Institutions: Penn State University
- Academic advisors: Thomas C. Bruice

Stephen James Benkovic is an American chemist known for his contributions to the field of enzymology. He holds the Evan Pugh University Professorship and Eberly Chair in Chemistry at The Pennsylvania State University. He has developed boron compounds that are active pharmacophores against a variety of diseases. Benkovic has concentrated on the assembly and kinetic attributes of the enzymatic machinery that performs DNA replication, DNA repair, and purine biosynthesis.

== Education ==
Benkovic was born in Orange, New Jersey, US. He attended Lehigh University, where he received his B.S. in chemistry and A.B. degree in English literature in 1960. He then earned his Ph.D. in organic chemistry from Cornell University in 1963. He was a postdoctoral research associate at the University of California at Santa Barbara from 1964 to 1965.

In 1965, he became a member of the Chemistry Department at Penn State University, and later in 1970, he was promoted to the position of full professor of chemistry. He received further recognition in 1977 as an Evan Pugh Professor of Chemistry and in 1988 as the holder of the Eberly Chair in Chemistry.

== Career ==
Benkovic has made contributions that have impacted our understanding of biological processes. He was among the first to hypothesize that conformational changes outside an enzyme's active site were necessary for achieving maximal catalysis. This was illustrated in his studies on dihydrofolate reductase (DHFR) that identified dynamic structural changes and their time scale that optimized the enzyme turnover. He showed how multi-enzyme complexes are assembled to achieve specificity and function and where several activities are present how they are integrated. This was accomplished in his studies on DNA replication that featured the assembly, disassembly and function of the T4 replisome that coordinates DNA replication. Benkovic discovered the first example of a reversible metabolon, the purinosome in de novo purine biosynthesis, that only assembles in response to cellular demands and acts temporally and spatially to deliver needed metabolites to cellular constituents.

Conformational Movements

A major theme of Benkovic's research has been understanding the source of the efficiency of enzymatic catalysis. He first dissected into individual steps the catalytic cycle used by dihydrofolate reductase (DHFR) using pre-steady-state methods and then tied the contribution of various amino acids, both within and outside the active site, to specific steps. Significant changes in the rates of hydride transfer were not limited to active-site residues, nor were the effects of multiple mutations additive in terms of free energy. The amide backbone and side chains of these distal residues were found by NMR to be in regions of high frequency motion (n-psec) and by molecular dynamic simulations the motions of these distal residues were found to be coupled. Genomic analysis of multiple DHFR sequences revealed low overall DNA sequence homology (30%), but surprisingly high conservation in the same regions whose amino acids had been implicated in catalysis by kinetic analysis, NMR measurements, and molecular dynamics simulations. The latter directly incorporated these distal residues into a network that acted along the reaction coordinate to facilitate the hydride transfer.

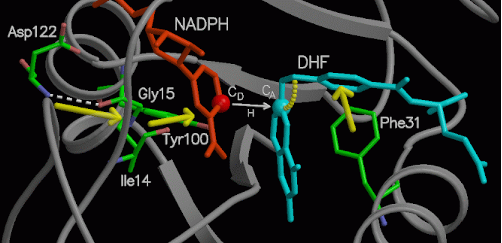
Illustration

This concept was further elaborated to posit that the measured rates of steps that constitute the turnover cycle of DHFR represent the rates of the conformational changes required to execute the chemical transformation. The enzymic reaction is not limited by the energetics of the chemical reaction but by the mechanics of sampling that occur within the enzyme substrate complex.

This concept of biological catalysis has the enzyme's highly pre-organized Michaelis complex with its active-site residues and substrates juxtaposed by using the dynamics of the protein fold to sample substrate and active site conformations in order to find those optimal for the chemical transformation. The actual chemistry of bond breaking and forming is fast relative to the sampling process. Only a small change triggered by movement within the protein fold along a network of coupled residues is needed to surmount the reaction barrier. The protein fold dictates the type of chemistry that a class of enzymes can accomplish (a rationale for the common mechanistic element extent in protein super-families); allosteric effects are a consequence of creating or inhibiting such networks and drugs can be designed that target such networks. It also explains the generally low catalytic activity of more rigid structures such as macrocycles and antibodies.

A multi-enzyme complex for the replication of DNA—the T4 replisome

Of particular importance is how multiple protein systems such as the replisomes responsible for DNA replication function where protein-protein interactions create a large catalytic network. The T4 replisome can be assembled in vitro from eight separate proteins into the four units that catalyze leading and lagging strand synthesis at a replication fork. With a functioning replisome capable of leading/lagging strand synthesis in hand, key discoveries of broad interest applicable to other replisomes were made. Firstly the polymerase actively exchanges in/out of the two holoenzymes within the replisome thus providing a "remodeling" flexibility for the repair of stalled replication forks that occur on damaged DNA strands by other lesion bypass polymerases. Secondly, two mechanisms dictate Okazaki fragment length: the classical collision mechanism where a finished Okazaki fragment abuts the previous one releasing the lagging strand polymerase and the signaling mechanism where the lagging strand polymerase recycles before the completion of the previous Okazaki fragment. This feature is essential to maintain coordinated leading/lagging strand synthesis.

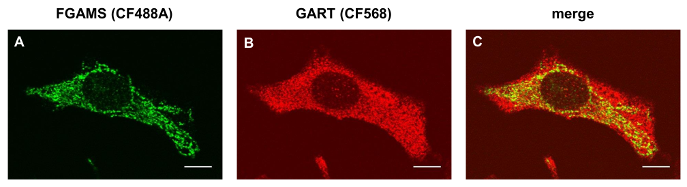
FGMAS GART

De Novo Purine Biosynthesis by a Purinosome Metabolon

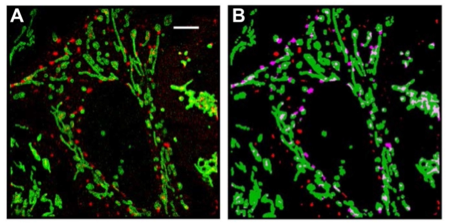
De Novo Purine Biosynthesis

A longstanding question in cellular metabolism is how metabolic enzymes in a given network organize within the cytosol, densely packed with myriad proteins and metabolites, to facilitate metabolic flux. One solution is through the formation of a macromolecular complex of enzymes, termed a 'metabolon'. The de novo purine biosynthetic pathway is a highly conserved, energy-intensive pathway that generates inosine 5ᶦ-monophosphate (IMP) from phosphoribosylpyrophosphate (PRPP). In humans, this metabolic transformation is carried out in ten steps by the sequential orchestration of the activities of the six enzymes. Evidence that the enzymes might condense within cells to form the purinosome derived from confocal microscopy on HeLa cells using chimeric constructs of these enzymes that revealed in common merged punctates for the six enzymes as illustrated for the two enzymes, FGAMS and GART. Unlike more traditional static metabolons, purinosome formation is a reversible process. Spatial control of purinosome assembly in HeLa cells was found to be microtubule assisted and to colocalize with mitochondria as shown by super resolution chemical imaging. De novo purine biosynthesis is likely most efficient when purinosomes are located near mitochondria to capture needed substrates exported from the mitochondria.

Drug Inhibitors Contain Boron

Although boron containing compounds had been eschewed as drugs because of their general toxicity by pharmaceutical chemists, the Benkovic Lab created a library of boron containing compounds that showed surprising antifungal activity in phenotypic screening of yeast. Their low systemic toxicity in laboratory animals led to the founding of Anacor Pharmaceuticals by Benkovic and Lucy Shapiro that developed and commercialized nonsteroidal anti-inflammatory drug for pediatric and adult use. Continuing research suggests that boron containing molecules can have a potential to intervene in a variety of diseases such as—bacterial and fungal infections, pulmonary hypertension, and oncology.

== Awards and honors ==
- 1977 - Pfizer Award in Enzyme Chemistry from the American Chemical Society
- 1984 - Fellow of the American Academy of Arts and Sciences
- 1985 - Elected to the National Academy of Sciences
- 1986 – Gowland Hopkins Award
- 1989 - Repligen Award in Chemistry of Biological Processes
- 1994 – Institute of Medicine, National Academy of Sciences
- 1995 – Alfred Bader Award
- 1995 – Honorary Doctorate of Science, Lehigh University
- 1998 - Chemical Pioneer Award, The American Institute of Chemists
- 2000 - Christian B. Anfinsen Award
- 2002 - Elected to membership in the American Philosophical Society
- 2003 - ASBMB–Merck Award
- 2005 - Nakanishi Prize
- 2006 – Royal Society Centenary Medal
- 2009 - Benjamin Franklin Medal in Life Science
- 2009 - National Medal of Science
- 2010 - Ralph F. Hirschmann Award in Peptide Chemistry
- 2011 – National Academy of Science Award in Chemical Sciences
- 2015 – National Academy of Inventors (NAI) Fellow
- 2018 – College of Physicians of Philadelphia Fellow
- 2021 – Foreign Member of the Royal Society (ForMemRS)

== Selected publications ==
- Fierke, C. A., Johnson, K. A., and Benkovic, S. J. (1987) Construction and evaluation of the kinetic scheme associated with dihydrofolate reductase from Escherichia coli, Biochemistry 26, 4085-4092.
- Rajagopalan, P. T. R., Lutz, S., and Benkovic, S. J. (2002) Coupling interactions of distal residues enhance dihydrofolate reductase catalysis: Mutational effects on hydride transfer rates, Biochemistry 41, 12618-12628.
- Epstein, D. M., Benkovic, S. J., and Wright, P. E. (1995) Dynamics of the dihydrofolate reductase—folate complex: Catalytic sites and regions known to undergo conformational change exhibit diverse dynamical features, Biochemistry 34, 11037-11048.
- Benkovic, S. J. and Hammes-Schiffer, S. (2003) A perspective on enzyme catalysis, Science 301, 1196-1202.
- Agarwal, P. K., Billeter, S. R., Rajagopalan, P. T. R., Benkovic, S. J., and Hammes-Schiffer, S. (2002) Network of coupled promoting motions in enzyme catalysis, Proc. Natl. Acad. Sci. USA 99, 2794-2799.
- Hammes-Schiffer, S. and Benkovic, S. J. (2006) Relating protein motion to catalysis, Annu. Rev. Biochem. 75, 519-541.
- Lee, J., Natarajan, M., Nashine, V. C., Socolich, M., Vo, T., Russ, W. P., Benkovic, S. J., and Ranganathan, R. (2008) Surface Sites for Engineering Allosteric Control in Proteins, Science 322, 438-442.
- Goodey, N. M. and Benkovic, S. J. (2008) Allosteric regulation and catalysis emerge via a common route, Nat. Chem. Biol. 4, 474-482.
- Lerner, R. A., Benkovic, S. J., and Schultz, P. G., (1991) At the Crossroads of Chemistry and Immunology: Catalytic Antibodies, Science 252, 659 667.
- Yang, J., Zhuang, Z., Roccasecca, R. M., Trakselis, M. A., and Benkovic, S. J. (2004) The dynamic processivity of the T4 DNA polymerase during replication, Proc Natl. Acad. Sci. USA 101, 8289-8294.
- Benkovic, S.J., Spiering, M.M. (2017) "Understanding DNA Replication by the Bacteriophage T4 Replisome", JBC, 292 (45) 18434-18442.
- An, S., Kumar, R., Sheets, E. D., and Benkovic, S. J. (2008) Reversible compartmentalization of de novo purine biosynthetic complexes in living cells, Science 320, 103-106.
- French, J. B., Jones, S.A., Deng, H., Hu, H., Pugh, R. J., Chan C. Y., Kim, D., Pedley, A. M., Zhao, H., Zhang, Y., Huang, T. J., Fang, Y., Zhuang, X., and Benkovic, S. J., (2016) Spatial colocalization and functional link of purinosomes with mitochondria, Science, 351:6274, 733-736.
- Pedley, A.M., Pareek, V., Benkovic, S.J. (2022) The Purinosome: A Case Study for a Mammalian Metabolon, Annu. Rev. of Biochem., Volume 91:89-106.
- Rock, F. L., Mao, W., Yaremchuk, A., Tukalo, M., Crepin, T., Zhou, H., Zhang, Y.-K., Hernandez, V., Akama, T., Baker, S. J., Plattner, J. J., Shapiro, L., Martinis, S. A., Benkovic, S. J., Cusack, S., and Alley, M. R. K. (2007) An antifungal agent inhibits an aminoacyl-tRNA synthetase by trapping tRNA in the editing site, Science 316, 1759-1761.
