= NAS Award in Chemical Sciences =

The National Academy of Sciences Award in Chemical Sciences is awarded for innovative research in the chemical sciences that in the broadest sense contributes to a better understanding of the natural sciences and to the benefit of humanity.

== Recipients ==
Source: National Academy of Sciences

- Benjamin F. Cravatt (2026)
- Peter Guy Wolynes (2025)

"For his breakthrough contributions that advanced our understanding of protein structure, dynamics, and function."

- Kimberly Prather (2024)
- Krzysztof Matyjaszewski (2023)
- Esther Takeuchi (2022)
- Peter G. Schultz (2021)
- John C. Tully (2020)

"For his contributions to our understanding of the rates and pathways of chemical processes in gas phase, condensed phase, and surfaces through analyses and creation of computational tools such as surface hopping, which is needed for simulating molecular motion evolving on multiple potential energy surfaces."

- Jacqueline Barton (2019)

"For her pioneering contributions to our understanding of the chemical, biological and spectroscopic properties of the DNA double helix."

- Jennifer Doudna (2018)

"For co-inventing the technology for efficient site-specific genome engineering using CRISPR/Cas9 nucleases."

- Armand Paul Alivisatos (2017)

"For making fundamental contributions to the controlled synthesis of colloidal inorganic nanocrystals, measuring and understanding their unique physical properties, and utilizing these properties for applications ranging from light generation and harvesting to biological imaging."

- Carolyn Bertozzi (2016)

"For founding bio-orthogonal chemistry, and applying this novel chemistry to install artificial sugars on the surface of living cells, enabling the study of their roles in cancer and the immune system."

- W. Carl Lineberger (2015)

"For his development of molecular negative ion photoelectron spectroscopy, and the fundamental insights into molecular electron affinities and intramolecular dynamics derived therefrom."

- Marvin H. Caruthers (2014)

"For his pioneering contributions to the chemical synthesis of DNA and RNA that made it possible to decode and encode genes and genomes."

- Gabor A. Somorjai (2013)

"In recognition of his pioneering experimental and conceptual contributions to the understanding of surface chemistry and catalysis at a microscopic and molecular level."

- Tobin J. Marks (2012)

"For groundbreaking contributions to understanding structure and function of catalysts, useful in the production of environmentally friendly plastics and new materials for the benefit of mankind."

- Stephen J. Benkovic (2011)

"For contributions to understanding catalysis and complex biological machines — the purinosome and DNA polymerases — which demonstrate the power of chemistry to solve biological problems."

- Louis E. Brus (2010)

"For his leading role in the development of a fundamental building block for nanoscience, colloidal semiconductor nanocrystals, and for his contributions to our understanding of the quantum effects that control their optical properties."

- Joanna S. Fowler (2009)

"For exceptional accomplishments in the synthesis of positron-emitting chemical probes, and for their implementation in biomedical imaging and studies of in vivo biochemistry, which have had a major impact on human health worldwide."

- JoAnne Stubbe (2008)

"For work on the mechanisms and regulation of ribonucleotide reductases, a demonstration of the power of chemical investigations to solve problems in biology."

- Robert G. Bergman (2007)

"For numerous innovative contributions at the interfaces of physical, organic, and inorganic chemistry, including the discoveries of alkane carbon-hydrogen bond oxidative addition and 1,4-benzene diradicals."

- Samuel J. Danishefsky (2006)

"For his wide-ranging accomplishments in natural products total synthesis and for his pioneering chemical synthesis of carbohydrates for the development of anticancer vaccines."

- Thomas C. Bruice (2005)

"For his leading role in the development of bioorganic chemistry, and especially for deep and lasting contributions to the understanding of enzyme mechanisms."

- Robert G. Parr (2004)

"For being a pioneer, leader, and central figure in the development of density functional theory in chemistry and for his deep insights into quantum chemical calculations."

- Harry B. Gray (2003)

"For his demonstration of long-range electron tunneling in proteins, his teaching and mentoring of students, and his service as a statesman for chemistry."

- Elias J. Corey (2002)

"For his development of the theory and methodology of organic synthesis, specifically retrosynthetic analysis."

- John I. Brauman (2001)

"For his wide-ranging contributions to the fundamental understanding of chemical reactivity, especially the acid-base, nucleophilic, and hydrogen-bonding properties of ions and molecules."

- K. Barry Sharpless (2000)

"For his discovery of chemical reactions – the Sharpless asymmetric epoxidation, dihydroxylation, and aminohydroxylation – which have revolutionized organic chemistry by transforming asymmetric synthesis from near-impossible to routine."

- John D. Roberts (1999)

"For defining modern physical organic chemistry – the integration of physical chemistry and organic synthesis applied to the study of the relations between the structure and reactivity of organic molecules."

- Allen J. Bard (1998)

"For his fundamental developments in mechanistic electrochemistry, electrochemiluminescence, semiconductor photoelectrochemistry, and scanning electrochemical microscopy."

- M. Frederick Hawthorne (1997)

"For his fundamental contributions to boron chemistry, especially his groundbreaking studies of boron hydrides and metallocarboranes and their uses in catalysts and radioimaging."

- Ahmed H. Zewail (1996)

"For carrying out the pioneering work that established the new field of laser femtochemistry, using ultrafast lasers and molecular beams to probe the dynamics of the chemical bond in real time."

- Isabella L. Karle (1995)

"For her development of a method for determining essentially equal-atom crystal and molecular structures by X-ray analysis, thereby profoundly affecting the practice of chemistry."

- Koji Nakanishi (1994)

"For his discoveries on the structure of a vast array of important natural products and unique contributions to the role of retinal in vision."

- Richard H. Holm (1993)

"For his contributions in unifying the fields of inorganic and biological chemistry through studies of metal clusters and metalloproteins."

- Donald J. Cram (1992)

"For elucidation of fundamental questions of stereochemistry and reaction mechanism and for pioneering work on the synthesis and properties of designed inclusion (host–guest) complexes."

- Richard N. Zare (1991)

"For his laser-based techniques, insights, and seminal contributions, which have influenced every facet of chemical reaction dynamics."

- F. Albert Cotton (1990)

"For his broad contribution to modern inorganic chemistry and, in particular, for having established the existence and importance of multiple metal-to-metal bonding."

- Ronald Breslow (1989)

"For his imaginative invention of novel synthetic methods, his enunciation of the mechanism of enzyme reactions, and his development of systems that mimic enzyme activity."

- Harden M. McConnell (1988)

"For his basic studies, which enhanced the power of spectroscopy and increased our understanding of the structural and dynamic properties of membranes in living cells."

- Herbert C. Brown (1987)

"For his studies of organoboranes, which revealed important new chemistry and established them as versatile intermediates in synthesis."

- Roald Hoffmann (1986)

"For his contributions to chemistry, bringing together theory and experiment; quantum mechanics; and organic, inorganic, organometallic, and solid state chemistry."

- Richard Barry Bernstein (1985)

"For his scholarly research, distinguished by pioneering development of new methods, followed by brilliant theoretical and experimental examination of molecular systems having broad impact on current views of chemical reactivity."

- Henry Taube (1983)

"For his pioneering work on inorganic reaction mechanisms, specifically his discovery of 'inner-' and 'outer-sphere' mechanisms of electron transfer reactions, which profoundly influenced studies in biochemistry and organic chemistry."

- Gilbert Stork (1982)

"For his creative contributions to the synthesis of complex organic molecules by the development of novel methods and strategies."

- Bruno H. Zimm (1981)

"For his contributions and influence in theoretical and experimental polymer chemistry, notably his work on polymer interactions, polymer visco-elasticity, the helix coil transition in bio-polymers, the theory of light scattering, and the study of extraordinarily large DNA molecules."

- Frank H. Westheimer (1980)

"For his pioneering studies in applying physical chemistry to the understanding of organic chemistry and enzymatic reactions."

- Linus Pauling (1979)

"For his studies, which elucidated in structural terms the properties of stable molecules of progressively higher significance to the chemical, geological, and biological sciences."

== See also ==
- List of chemistry awards
