= Thomas Bruice =

Thomas C. Bruice
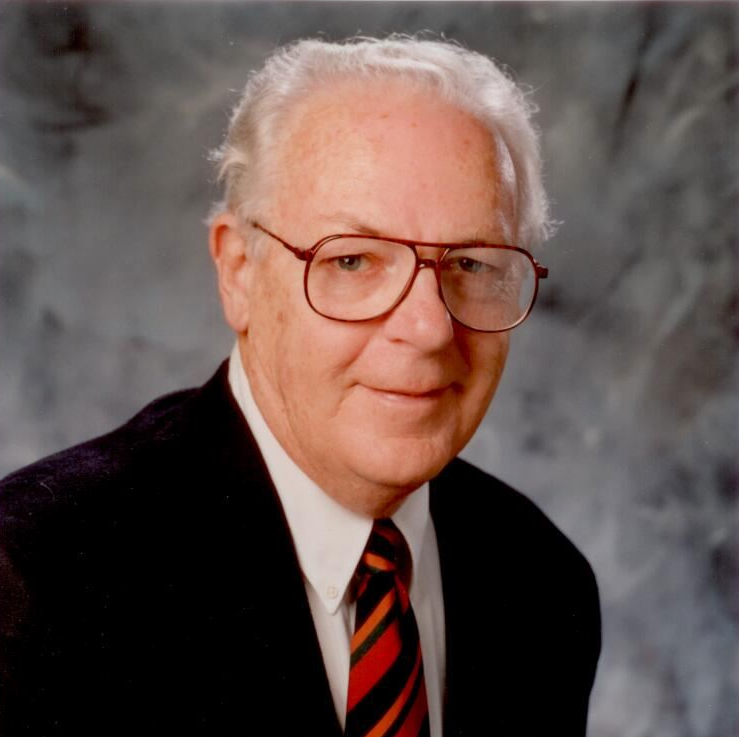
- Born: August 25, 1925
- Died: February 15, 2019 (aged 93)
- Education: University of Southern California (B.S., Ph.D.)
- Known for: Use of imidazole-catalyzed hydrolysis of p-nitrophenyl acetate as a model system
- Awards: NAS Award in Chemical Sciences
- Scientific career
- Fields: Bioorganic chemistry, enzyme catalysis, computational chemistry
- Institutions: University of California, Los Angeles; Yale University; Johns Hopkins University; Cornell University; University of California, Santa Barbara

Thomas C. Bruice (August 25, 1925 – February 15, 2019) was a professor of chemistry and biochemistry at University of California, Santa Barbara. He was elected to the National Academy of Sciences in 1974. He was a pioneering researcher in the area of bioorganic chemistry, one of the pillars of what was to become modern chemical biology, and is one of the 50 most cited chemists.

== Education & Professional Career ==
Bruice earned his B.S. in organic chemistry at the University of Southern California in 1950 after serving in the U.S. Navy as a hospital corpsman assigned to the First Marine Division during the World War II island campaigns in the South Pacific. He obtained his Ph.D. in biochemistry at USC in 1954, and he carried out post-doctoral work with his Lilly fellowship at University of California, Los Angeles. He was a faculty member at Yale University (Assistant Professor of Biochemistry, 1955–1958), Johns Hopkins University (Associate Professor of Biochemistry, 1958–1960), and Cornell University (Professor of Chemistry, 1960–1964). He joined the faculty at the University of California, Santa Barbara as Professor of Chemistry in 1964. In these roles, he mentored numerous graduate students and postdoctoral scholars from around the world who then built successful careers in academia, National Laboratories, and industry.

== Research ==
=== Papers ===
Bruice published more than 600 papers during his 60+ year career. He saw himself as a bioorganic chemist rather than as a biochemist, and that description is very apt for his work, as most of the molecules that he studied were natural products such as thyroxine. In addition, he made important contributions to understanding enzyme catalysis, and he pioneered the use of imidazole-catalyzed hydrolysis of p-nitrophenyl acetate as a model system. (This system has the practical advantage that it is very convenient to follow the hydrolysis spectrophotometrically.) He also studied a similar reaction catalyzed by the enzyme ribonuclease. More generally, he made a study of mechanisms for chymotrypsin catalysis, and in particular the "charge-relay" system as a way of understanding the role of the catalytic triad that exists in such enzymes. He considered that "orbital steering" was a new name for a well established observation.

=== Reviews ===
Bruice wrote reviews on a number of topics, including the use of small molecules to understand catalysis and the chemistry of flavins, and on enzyme catalysis in general.

=== Books ===
Bruice collaborated with Stephen Benkovic to write a two-volume work on Bioorganic Mechanisms that helped establish this field.

== Awards and Honors ==
- Academies and Fellows
  - 1974 - National Academy of Sciences (USA)
  - 1976 - American Academy of Arts and Sciences
  - 1979-1980 - Guggenheim Fellow
  - 1989 - Fellow of the American Association for the Advancement of Science
  - 1993 - Fellow of the Royal Society of Chemistry
- American Chemical Society Awards
  - 1978 - Tolman Award
  - 1987 - Arthur C. Cope Scholar Award (Organic Chemistry)
  - 1987 - Repligen Medal for "Outstanding contributions to the understanding of the chemistry of biological processes, with particular emphasis on structure, function and mechanism"
  - 1988 - Renaud Award of the Michigan State Section
  - 1988 - Alfred Bader Medal for "Outstanding contributions in Bioinorganic and Bioorganic Chemistry"
  - 1996 - James Flack Norris Award "Outstanding contributions to Physical Organic Chemistry"
  - 2005 - NAS Award in Chemical Sciences
  - 2008 - Linus Pauling Award
- National Institutes of Health Awards
  - 1956 - Career Development Award
  - 1962 - Life-time Investigator Award
  - 1990 - MERIT Award
  - 1997 - MERIT Award
- Named Lectures
  - 1970 - Phillips Lecturer, Haveford College
  - 1979 - E.C. Franklin Memorial Lecturer, Univ. of Kansas
  - 1983 - J. Clarence Kercher Lecturer, Univ. of Oklahoma
  - 1988 - Renaud Lectures, Michigan State Univ.
  - 1989 - Distinguished Syntex Lecturer, Colorado State Univ.
  - 1995 - Leermaker Lecture, Wesleyan Univ.
  - 1995 - Reilly Lectures in Biochemistry, Univ. of Notre Dame
  - 1999 - Jerome A. Berson Lecture, Yale Univ.
  - 2004-2005 - B.R. Baker Memorial Lecture, UCSB
