= Mabel Pugh =

American painter

- Born: 1891; Morrisville, North Carolina, U.S.
- Died: 1986 (aged 94–95); Raleigh, North Carolina, U.S.
- Known for: Illustration, Portraits

Mabel Pugh (1891–1986) was an art teacher, painter, woodblock printmaker and illustrator.

== Early life and education ==
Born in Morrisville, North Carolina, she studied at the Art Students League, the Pennsylvania Academy as well as with Charles W. Hawthorne. As the winner of the Cresson Traveling Scholarship in 1919, she sketched throughout Europe for four months.

== Career ==
Pugh then established her professional career in New York, contributing illustrations to McCall's, Ladies' Home Journal, The Forum and Survey Graphic. Her exhibition awards include Pennsylvania Academy of the Fine Arts in 1920 and the National Association of Women Painters and Sculptors in 1934. At the first New York World's Fair, Pugh showed the painting My Mother. Her work was represented in exhibitions at the National Academy of Design in 1932, National Academy of Women Artists in 1934/35, and the Pennsylvania Print Club from 1929 to 1931. She was both the author and illustrator of Little Carolina Bluebonnet, a 1933 Thomas Y. Crowell Co. publication. Her best known work is her floral map of North Carolina. Three portraits, of Clifford Hope, Harold D. Cooley, and Herbert Bonner, are in the collection of the United States House of Representatives. In 1936, Pugh returned to her alma mater, teaching at Peace College in Raleigh until her retirement in 1960.

Her home at Morrisville, the Pugh House, which she sold in 1958, was listed on the National Register of Historic Places in 2014.

== Gallery of works ==
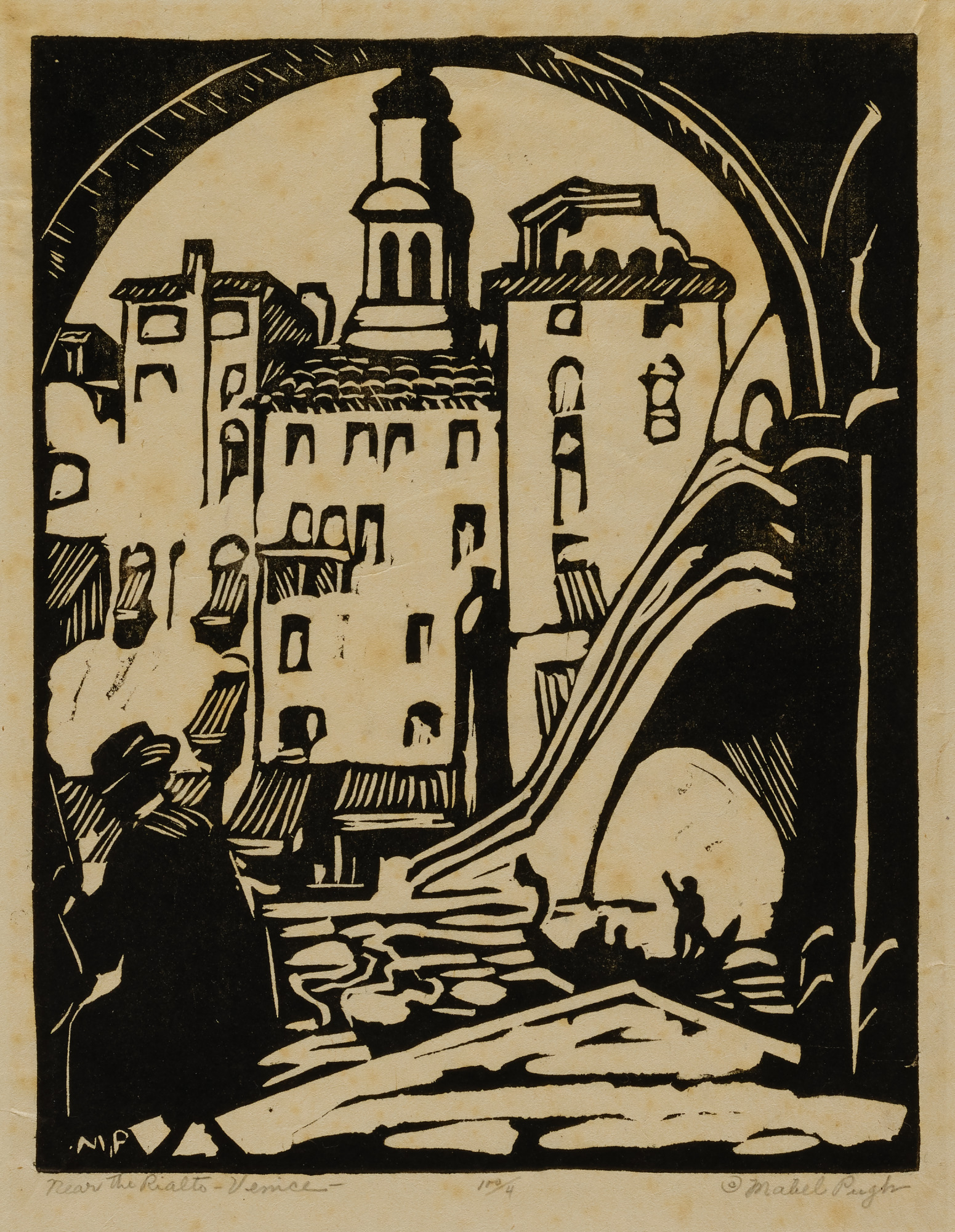
Near the Rialto, Venice, ca. 1923-1926

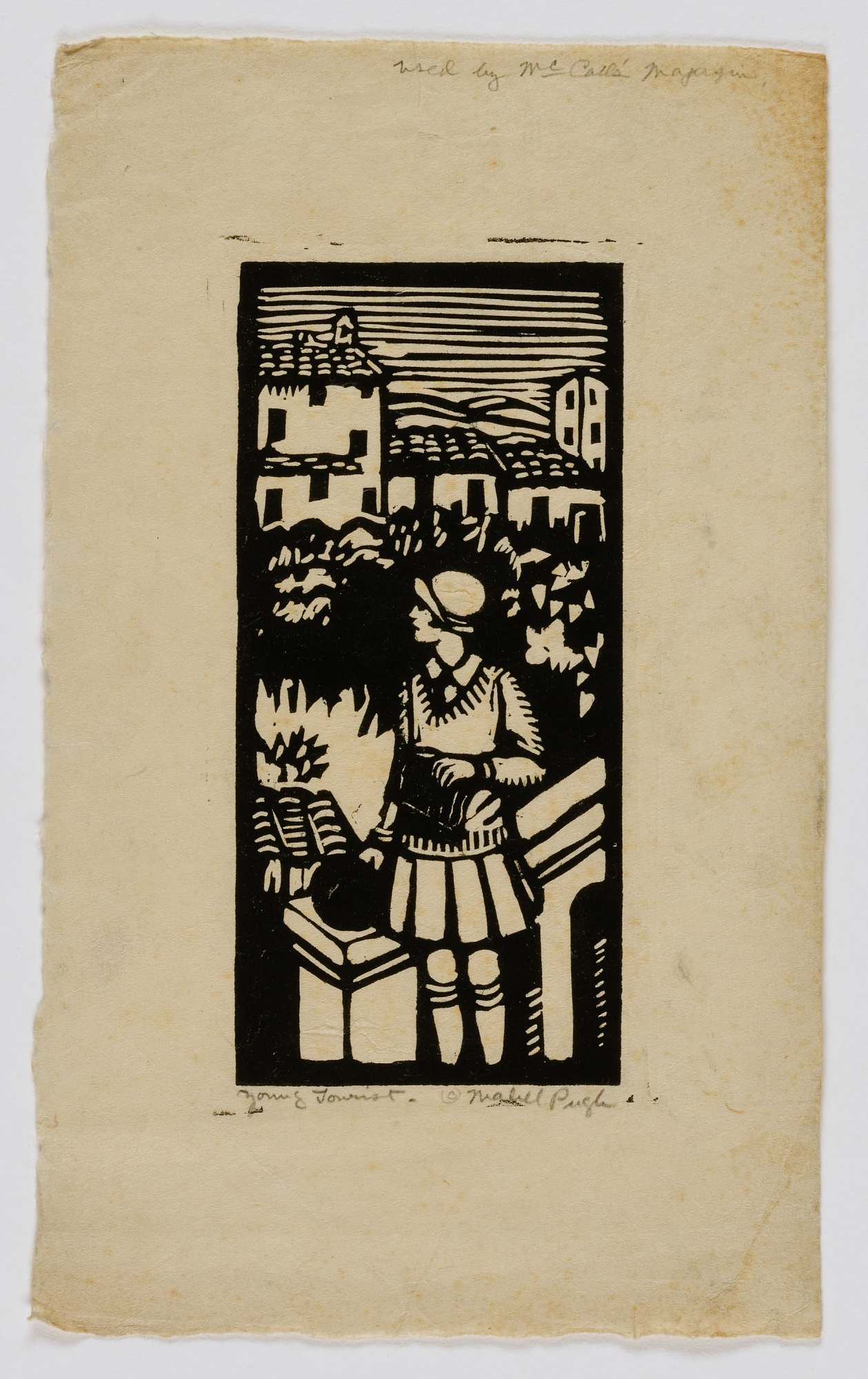
Young Tourist, ca. 1923-1926
