= John C. Tully =

American theoretical chemist

John C. Tully is a theoretical chemist, a researcher and Sterling Professor emeritus of Chemistry at Yale University. He is known for his development of surface hopping, a method for including excited states in molecular dynamics calculations. Much of his career was spent at Bell Labs, from 1970 to 1996, exploring theoretical chemistry and surface science. In 1996, he became a faculty member at Yale University, where he pursued research in physical chemistry and physics. He is a member of the National Academy of Sciences and the International Academy of Quantum Molecular Science. In 2020 he was awarded the NAS Award in Chemical Sciences.
