= Herbert Gutfreund =

British biochemist (1921–2021)

Herbert Gutfreund FRS
- Born: 21 October 1921; Vienna, Austria
- Died: 21 March 2021 (aged 99)
- Other name: Freddie
- Education: Fitzwilliam College, Cambridge (Ph.D. 1947)
- Scientific career
- Fields: Proteolyic enzymes, fast reaction kinetics
- Institutions: National Institute for Research in Dairying, Shinfield, Berkshire; University of Bristol

Herbert Gutfreund FRS (21 October 1921 – 21 March 2021), better known as Freddie Gutfreund, was a British biochemist of Austrian origin, and Emeritus Professor at the University of Bristol. Gutfreund died in March 2021 at the age of 99.

== Early life and education ==
Gutfreund was born on 21 October 1921 in Vienna to a middle-class professional family, the son of Clara (Pisko) and Paul Gutfreund. His father was a civil engineer, and on his mother's side there were several scientists including the physicist Karl Weissenberg. He had all his early education in Vienna. However, the political turmoil of the 1930s forced him to leave Austria for England after the Anschluss of 1938. He joined an agricultural training scheme and became an accomplished dairyman. His interest in physiology was stimulated by reading Principles of General Physiology by William Bayliss and he was much influenced by it. He earned his doctorate at Fitzwilliam College, Cambridge in 1947.

== Career ==
After several years at the National Institute for Research in Dairying in Shinfield, Berkshire, Gutfreund spent most of his career at the University of Bristol, where he worked on proteolytic enzymes, including chymotrypsin and trypsin, and was especially active in using methods of studying fast reactions to study enzyme mechanisms. In this connection he developed and improved apparatus for that purpose. Although in his first book he had suggested that metabolite channelling (direct transfer of intermediates between enzymes) might occur, in his later years he became hostile to this notion, particularly in relation to glycolysis.

== Textbooks ==
Gutfreund is also known for his textbooks on various aspects of enzyme catalysis:

- An Introduction to the Study of Enzymes.
- Enzymes: Physical Principles.
- Biochemical Evolution.
- Biothermodynamics: The Study of Biochemical Processes at Equilibrium. with John Edsall
- Kinetics for the Life Sciences: Receptors, Transmitters and Catalysts.

== Honours ==
He was elected to the Royal Society in 1981.
