= Joanna Fowler =

American chemist

Joanna Sigfred Fowler
- Born: August 9, 1942 (age 84); Miami, Florida
- Education: University of South Florida; University of Colorado Boulder
- Awards: Garvan–Olin Medal (1998); E. O. Lawrence Award (1998); National Medal of Science (2008); NAS Award in Chemical Sciences (2009)
- Scientific career
- Fields: nuclear medicine
- Workplaces: Brookhaven National Laboratory, U.S. Department of Energy, Stony Brook University

Joanna Sigfred Fowler (born August 9, 1942) is a scientist emeritus at the U.S. Department of Energy's Brookhaven National Laboratory in New York. She served as professor of psychiatry at Mount Sinai School of Medicine and director of Brookhaven's Radiotracer Chemistry, Instrumentation and Biological Imaging Program. Fowler studied the effect of disease, drugs, and aging on the human brain and radiotracers in brain chemistry. She has received many awards for her pioneering work, including the National Medal of Science.

== Life and education ==
Fowler was born in Miami, Florida, and attended the University of South Florida, where she received her bachelor's degree in chemistry in 1964. There, she worked in the laboratories of Jack Fernandez. Fowler received her Ph.D. in chemistry from the University of Colorado Boulder in 1967 and did her postdoctoral work at the University of East Anglia in England and at Brookhaven National Laboratory. Fowler worked at Brookhaven National Laboratory from 1969 until her retirement in January 2014. She is an emeritus professor in the chemistry department at Stony Brook University.

She is married to Frank Fowler, an emeritus professor of organic chemistry at Stony Brook University.

== Research and achievements ==
Fowler discusses using positron emission tomography (PET) scans as a means to explore the human brain and help answer critical medical questions.

Fowler's research has led to new fundamental knowledge, development of important scientific tools, and has broad impacts in the application of nuclear medicine to diagnostics and health. She has worked for much of her career developing radiotracers for brain imaging to understand the mechanisms underlying drug addiction. Most recently, she has been engaged in developing methods to understand the relationship between genes, brain chemistry, and behavior.

In 1976, Fowler and her colleagues designed and synthesized a radioactively "tagged" form of sugar that is now used widely to study brain function and also to diagnose and plan treatment for cancer. She also developed another radiotracer, as these "tagged" molecules are called, that first showed that cocaine's distribution in the human brain parallels its effects on behavior.

Fowler played a central role in the development of a fluorine-18-labeled glucose molecule (FDG) enabling human brain glucose metabolism to be measured noninvasively. This positron-emitting molecule, together with positron emission tomography (PET) imaging, has become a mainstay for brain-imaging studies in schizophrenia, aging and cancer.

Another of her major accomplishments was the development of the first radiotracers to map monoamine oxidase (MAO), a brain enzyme that regulates the levels of other nerve-cell communication chemicals and one of the two major enzymes involved in neurotransmitter regulation in the brain and peripheral organs. Using these radiotracers, she discovered that smokers have reduced levels of MAO in their brains and lungs. This may account for some of the behavioral and epidemiological features of smoking, such as the high rate of smoking in individuals with depression and drug addiction, two conditions involving poor nerve-cell communication, and has led to many studies on reduced MAO and smoking.

Fowler holds eight patents for radiolabeling procedures.

== Major publications ==
Fowler has published approximately 530 papers. The following are a few of the most cited:

- Inhibition of monoamine oxidase B in the brains of smokers. Fowler, J.S., Volkow, N.D., Wang, G.-J., et al. Nature. Volume 379, Issue 6567, 22 February 1996, Pages 733-736
- Distribution volume ratios without blood sampling from graphical analysis of PET data. Logan, J., Fowler, J.S., Volkow, N.D., et al. Journal of Cerebral Blood Flow and Metabolism. Volume 16, Issue 5, 1996, Pages 834-840
- Decreased dopamine D2 receptor availability is associated with reduced frontal metabolism in cocaine abusers. Volkow, N.D., Fowler, J.S., Wang, G.-J., et al. Synapse. Volume 14, Issue 2, 1993, Pages 169-177
- Brain dopamine and obesity. Wang, G.-J., Volkow, N., Fowler, J., et al. The Lancet. Volume 327, Issue 9253, 2001, Pages 354–357.
- Cocaine cues and dopamine in dorsal striatum: mechanism of craving in cocaine addiction. Volkow, N., Wang, G.-J., Fowler, J., et al. Journal of Neuroscience. Volume 26, Issue 24, 2006, Pages 6583-6588

== Awards and honors ==
Fowler's scientific excellence and achievements have been recognized by prestigious awards, including the National Medal of Science, awarded in 2009 by President Obama. In 2003, Fowler was elected to the National Academy of Sciences.

Her numerous other honors include:

- 1997 – Society of Nuclear Medicine's Paul C. Aebersold Award for outstanding achievement in basic science
- 1998 – American Chemical Society's Francis P. Garvan-John M. Olin Medal
- 1998 – E.O. Lawrence Award, awarded by the Department of Energy
- 2000 – Society of Nuclear Imaging in Drug Development's Alfred P. Wolf Award
- 2002 – American Chemical Society's Glen T. Seaborg Award for Nuclear Chemistry
- 2005 – Distinguished Basic Scientist of the Year Award from the Academy of Molecular Imaging (AMI)
- 2008 – National Medal of Science, administered by the National Science Foundation and bestowed by the president of the United States
- 2009 – National Academy of Science Award in Chemical Sciences, awarded by the National Academy of Sciences
- 2011 – Distinguished Women in Chemistry/Chemical Engineering Award, sponsored by the American Chemical Society
- Distinguished Scientist Fellowship, sponsored by the Department of Energy's Office of Biological and Environmental Research
