= Morrisville Christian Church =

Historic church in North Carolina, United States

- U.S. National Register of Historic Places
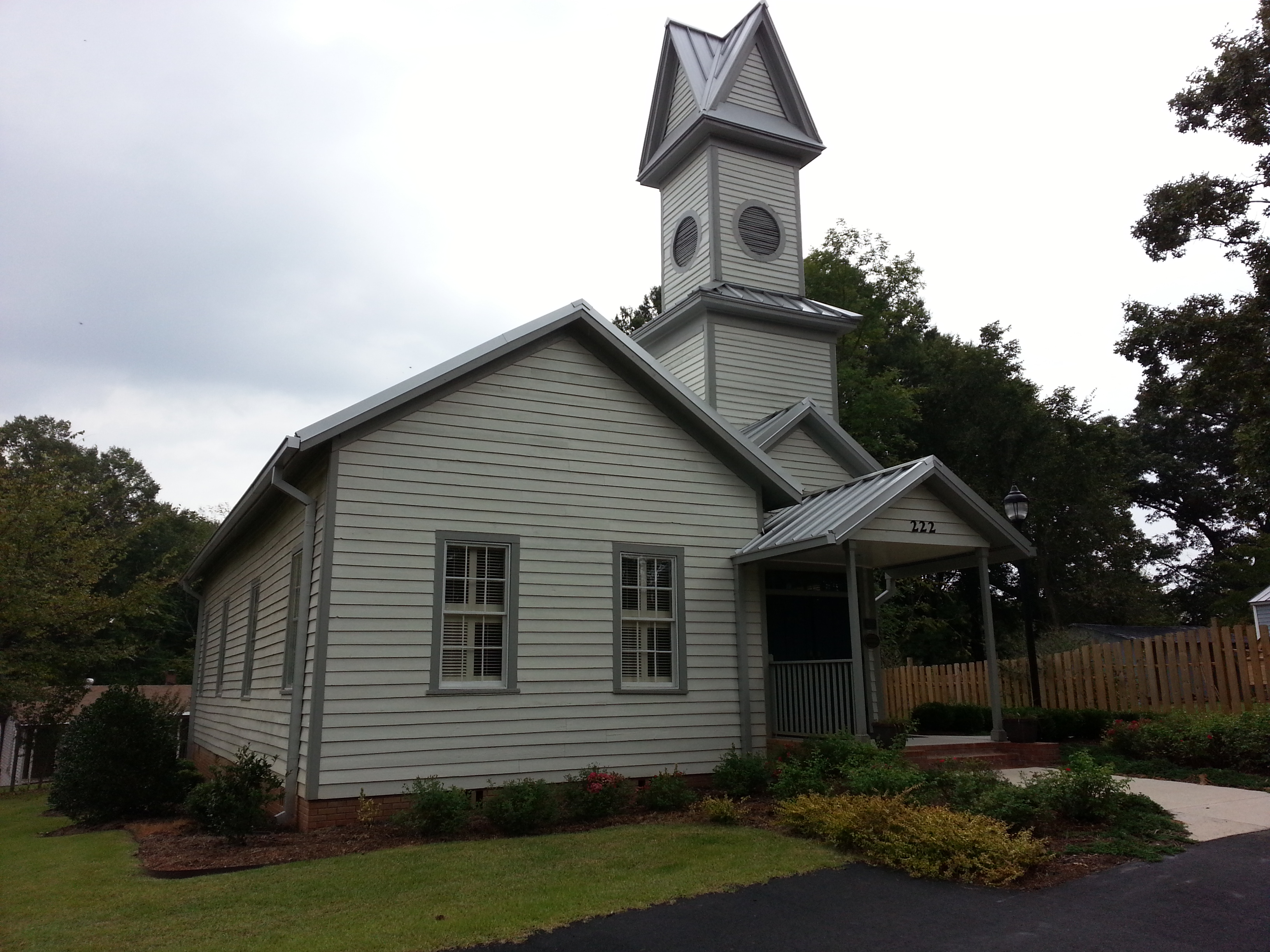
- Morrisville Christian Church, September 2013

- Location within North Carolina Location within the United States
- Location: 222 Church St., Morrisville, North Carolina
- Coordinates: 35°49′30″N 78°49′42″W
- Area: 0.29 acres (0.12 ha)
- Built: 1872-1873
- MPS: Historic and Architectural Resources of Wake County, North Carolina
- NRHP reference No.: 12000913
- Added to NRHP: November 6, 2012

Morrisville Christian Church, also known as Morrisville Church of Christ, is a historic church located at Morrisville, Wake County, North Carolina. It was built in 1872–1873, and is a one-story, three-bay by four bay, vernacular front-gable church. It has a projecting front gable and prominent three-stage corner bell tower, which contains the main entrance, protected by a front-gabled portico. The church retains its original wood flooring, wall and ceiling finishes, and floor plan. The United Church of Christ sold the building to the Town of Morrisville in 1976 and it houses a community center.

It was listed on the National Register of Historic Places in 2012.
