= Williamson Page House =

Historic house in North Carolina, United States

- U.S. National Register of Historic Places
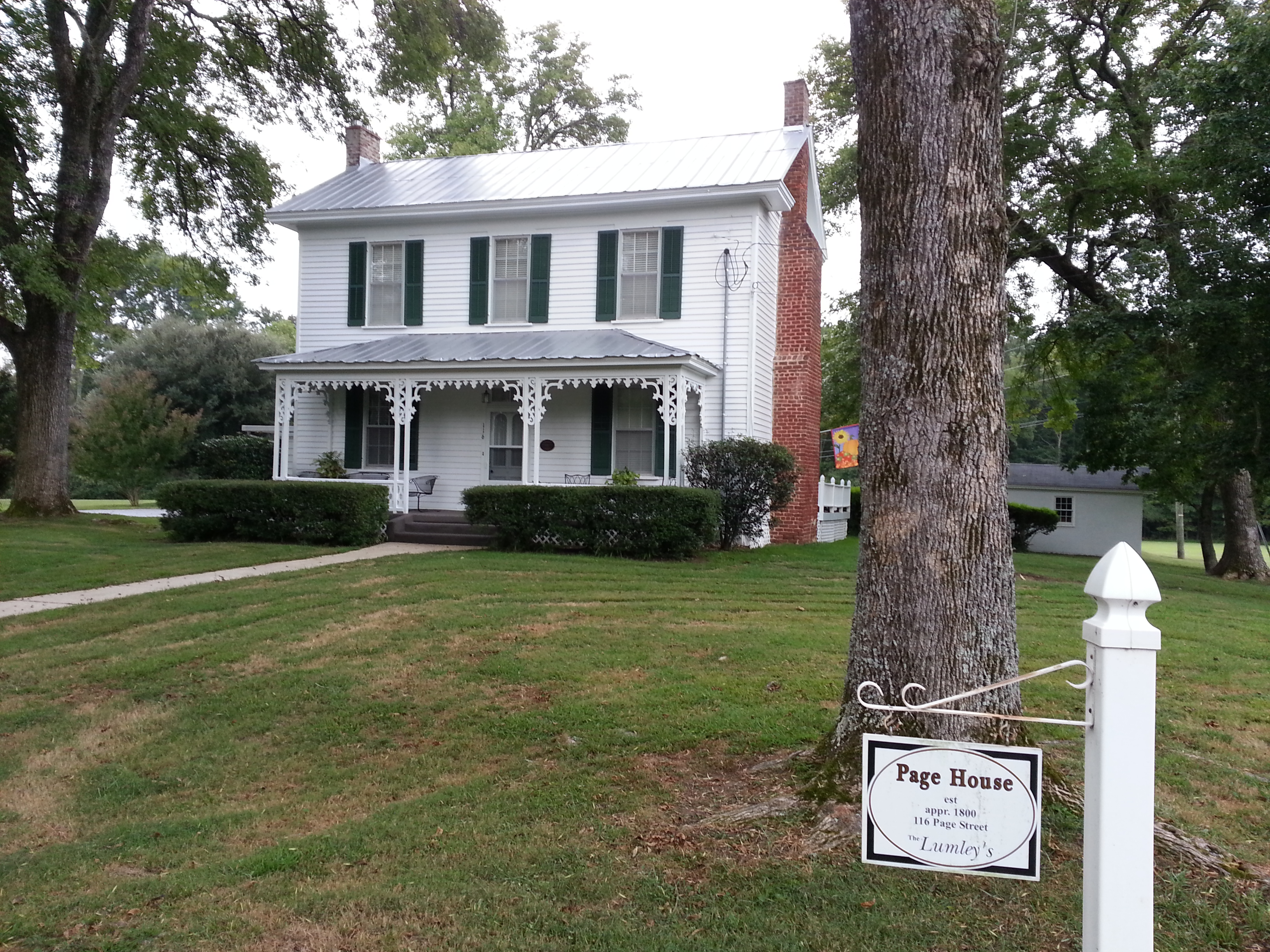
- Williamson Page House, September 2013

- Location within North Carolina Location within the United States
- Location: 16 S. Page St., Morrisville, North Carolina
- Coordinates: 35°49′17″N 78°49′30″W
- Area: 3 acres (1.2 ha)
- Built: c. 1838, c. 1876
- Architectural style: I-house
- NRHP reference No.: 12000218
- Added to NRHP: April 16, 2012

Williamson Page House is a historic home located at Morrisville, Wake County, North Carolina. It is a two-story, three-bay-wide frame I-house. The front section was built about 1838, with a transverse stair hall added about 1876, which connects the front section with a two-story rear ell dated to the mid-19th century. The front section has a side gable roof and one-story hipped-roof porch with jig sawn spandrels and a flat balustrade.

It was listed on the National Register of Historic Places in 2012.
