= Pugh House (Morrisville, North Carolina) =

Historic house in North Carolina, United States

- U.S. National Register of Historic Places
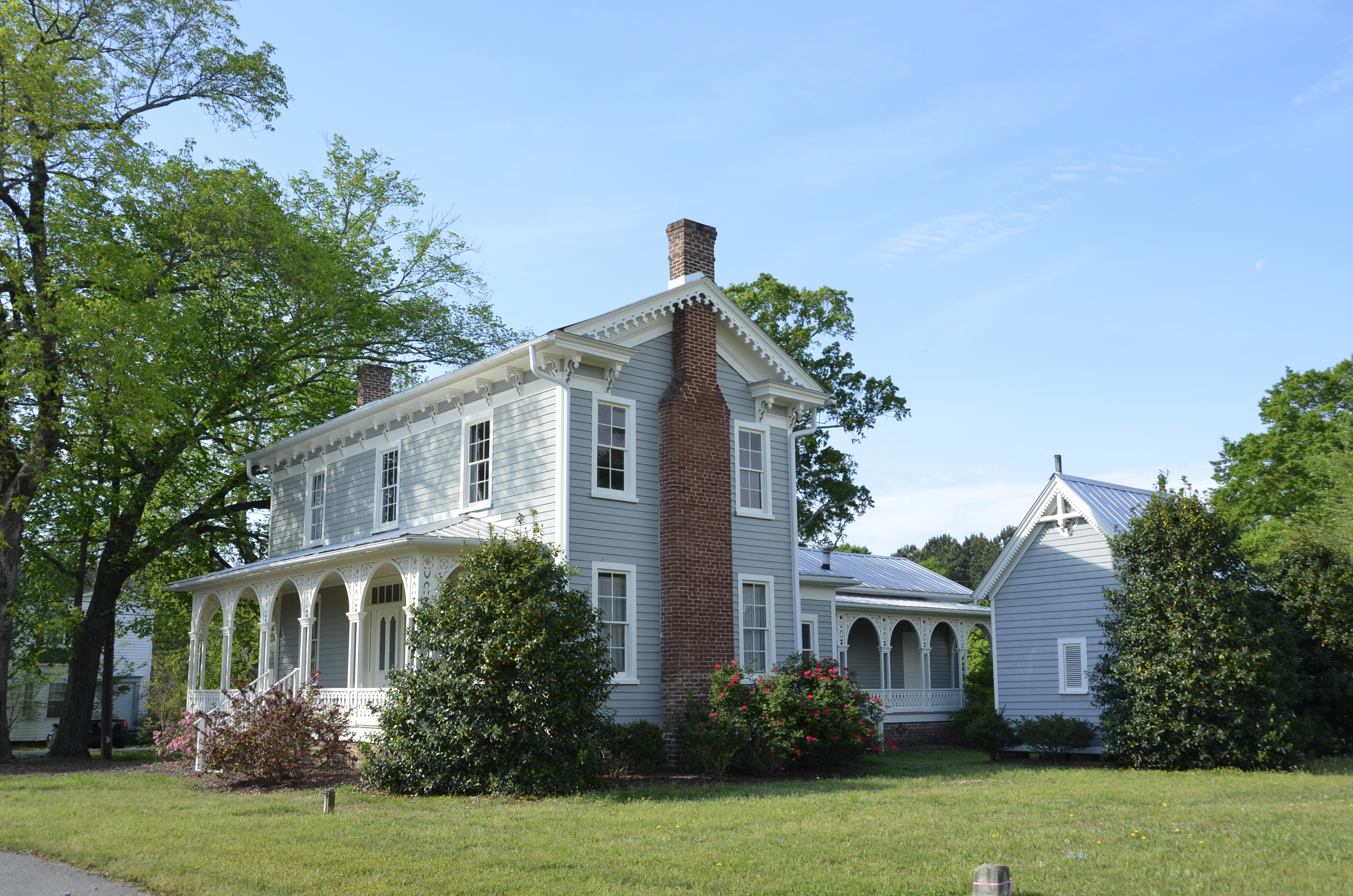

- Location within North Carolina Location within the United States
- Location: 103 Page St., Morrisville, North Carolina
- Coordinates: 35°49′21″N 78°49′34″W
- Area: 0.25 acres (0.10 ha)
- Built: c. 1870, 1923, 1936
- Architectural style: Italianate
- MPS: Historic and Architectural Resources of Wake County, North Carolina
- NRHP reference No.: 03000932 (Original Listing), 14000334
- Added to NRHP: September 11, 2003 (Original Listing); June 19, 2014 (relisting)

Pugh House is a historic home located at Morrisville, Wake County, North Carolina. The house was built about 1870, and is a two-story, three-bay-wide, Italianate style frame I-house with a one-story end-gabled rear ell. It features molded roof cornice brackets with finials, bargeboards with fleur-de-lis-shaped motifs, and a hip roofed front porch. Also on the property is a contributing smokehouse (c. 1880). The house and smokehouse were moved from 10018 Chapel Hill Road to their present location in 2008. It was the home of artist Mabel Pugh (1891–1986), who sold the house in 1958.

It was originally listed on the National Register of Historic Places in 2003, delisted in 2008, then relisted in 2014.
