= Purinosome =

Diagram of the synthesis of IMP enzymes coenzymes substrate names metal ions inorganic molecules

The purinosome is a putative multi-enzyme complex that carries out de novo purine biosynthesis within the cell. It is postulated to include all six of the human enzymes identified as direct participants in this ten-step biosynthetic pathway converting phosphoribosyl pyrophosphate to inosine monophosphate:

Step(s)	Symbol	Description
1	PPAT	phosphoribosylpyrophosphate amidotransferase
2,3,5	GART	trifunctional phosphoribosylglycinamide formyltransferase/phosphoribosylglycinamide synthetase/phosphoribosylaminoimidazole synthetase
4	PFAS	phosphoribosylformylglycinamidine synthase
6,7	PAICS	bifunctional phosphoribosylaminoimidazole carboxylase
8	ADSL	adenylosuccinate lyase
9,10	ATIC	bifunctional 5-aminoimidazole-4-carboxamide ribonucleotide formyltransferase/IMP cyclohydrolase

== History ==
=== Hypothesis ===
The enzymes of the multi-step de novo purine biosynthesis pathway have been postulated to form a multi-enzyme complex to facilitate substrate channeling between each enzyme of the pathway. Slight variations of the pathway exists between phyla; however, there are 13 enzymes that can be considered part of this biosynthetic pathway. Several individual enzymatic functions have consolidated onto single bifunctional or trifunctional polypeptide chains in higher organisms, suggesting stable physical interactions exist between enzymes. The functional consolidation of steps 2,3, and 5 of the pathway into a single enzyme in higher organisms such as humans suggests physical local proximity of the enzyme for step 4 to the trifunctional enzyme.

=== Evidence for a complex ===
The purine biosynthesis enzymes can be co-purified under certain conditions. A complex of two particular pathway enzymes GART and ATIC can be isolated with cofactor production enzyme C1THF synthase and SHMT1. Kinetic studies show evidence of substrate channeling between PPAT and GART, but evidence could not be obtained for their physical protein-protein interaction. Thus far, isolation of a multienzyme complex inclusive of all purine biosynthesis enzymes has not been achieved. In yeast, some enzymes implicated in de novo purine biosynthesis pathway were shown to be able to form mesoscale punctuations in cells. In E. coli, binary protein-protein interaction screening have shown the potential existence of a bacterial purinosome equivalent with a different architecture than in mammalian cells

== Purinosome macrobodies ==
Macrobodies composed of purinosome members. Purine biosynthesis enzymes cluster into discrete intracellular bodies when transiently expressed as fusions to enhanced green fluorescent protein (EGFP) in HeLa cells. FGAMS is an alternate name for PFAS.

Purinosome macrobodies (also may be referred to as bodies, clusters, foci, puncta) describe the assembly of fluorescent-tagged human purine biosynthetic enzymes into bodies visible by fluorescence microscopy. The purinosome body theory states that purinosome bodies are assembled from proteins normally dispersed in the cell, and this assembly manifests when the demand for purines exceeds the amount supplied by the purine salvage pathway, such as when the extracellular medium is depleted of purines. In addition to the 6 purine biosynthesis pathway proteins, purinosome macrobodies are composed of at least 10 additional proteins not involved in purine biosynthesis. Due to the nature of their expression and association with cellular stress response proteins, purinosome macrobodies may actually be aggregated protein bodies.

=== Initial discovery ===
The human purinosome was thought to have been identified in 2008 by the observation that transiently expressed GFP fusion constructs of purine biosynthesis proteins form macrobodies. A folate enzyme not directly involved in the purine biosynthesis pathway, 5,10-methenyltetrahydrofolate synthase (MTHFS), was later found to be part of purinosome macrobodies by the same approach. The biological relevance of this folate enzyme's inclusion to the purinosome macrobody is unclear: while it provides substrate for a trifunctional folate enzyme C1THF synthase to generate a key cofactor for purine biosynthesis, C1THF synthase is not a part of purinosome macrobodies. Curiously, hypoxanthine levels do not alter purinosome macrobodies, but adenosine or guanosine addition suppresses formation of macromolecular bodies formed by the folate enzyme.

=== Aggregation ===
Later studies in 2013 support the interpretation that those macrobodies could be artifacts of aggregated proteins that commonly result from fusion protein expression. Characteristics of purinosome bodies were found to be shared between those of canonical protein aggregates, such as induction by peroxide. While purinosome bodies were also found to be associated with early cell death, it is unclear whether the bodies were a cause of that stress or rather an indicator of stressed cells.

=== Discrepancies ===
Inhibition of microtubule polymerization with nocodazole blocks formation of the purinosome macrobodies, and reduces the flux of de novo purine biosynthesis. However, nocodazole also blocks formation of aggresomes, complicating interpretation of these observations. Partial inhibition of casein kinase 2 by small molecule inhibitors - 4,5,6,7-tetrabromo-1H-benzimidazole (TBI), 2-dimethylamino-4,5,6,7-tetrabromo-1H-benzimidazole (DMAT), tetrabromocinammic acid (TBCA) or ellagic acid - was found to induce purinosome macrobody formation, while another inhibitor, 4,5,6,7-tetrabromobenzotriazole (TBB) induced purinosome macrobody formation at low concentration but not at high concentration, and caused the dissociation of the bodies formed in response to DMAT. Complicating the interpretation of these data, inhibition of casein kinase 2 is also known to disrupt hundreds of cellular processes, among them being protein homeostasis which regulates protein aggregation.

=== Additional members of purinosome macrobodies ===
- methenyltetrahydrofolate synthetase (MTHFS) (provides substrate for C1THF synthase)
- Heat shock protein 70
- Heat shock protein 90
- Ubiquitin
- Bag5
- Stip1/Hop
- p23
- DnaJ-C7
- DnaJ-A1
- Nwd1

=== Proteins excluded from purinosome macrobodies ===
- C1THF synthase (provides single-carbon units for purine biosynthesis steps 3 and 9)
- SHMT1
- DnaJ-C14
- DnaJ-B1
- G3BP
- Aggresome marker GP250 (although its co-localization may be under debate)
