= Metabolite channeling =

Mechanism in enzymes

Metabolite channeling is the passing of the intermediary metabolic product of one enzyme directly to another enzyme or active site without its release into solution. When several consecutive enzymes of a metabolic pathway channel substrates between themselves, this is called a metabolon. Channeling can make a metabolic pathway more rapid and efficient than it would be if the enzymes were randomly distributed in the cytosol, or prevent the release of unstable intermediates. It can also protect an intermediate from being consumed by competing reactions catalyzed by other enzymes.

== Mechanisms for channeling ==
Channeling can occur in several ways. One possibility, which occurs in the pyruvate dehydrogenase complex, is by a substrate being attached to a flexible arm that moves between several active sites (not very likely). Another possibility is by two active sites being connected by a tunnel through the protein and the substrate moving through the tunnel; this is seen in tryptophan synthase. A third possibility is by a charged region on the surface of the enzyme acting as a pathway or "electrostatic highway" to guide a substrate that has the opposite charge from one active site to another. This is seen in the bifunctional enzyme dihydrofolate reductase-thymidylate synthase. The channeling of aminoacyl-tRNA for protein synthesis in vivo has been also reported.

== Controversies ==
=== Channeling of NADH between oxidoreductases ===
Some authors have maintained that direct transfer of NADH from one enzyme as product to another as substrate is a common phenomenon. However others, such as Gutfreund and Chock and Pettersson have argued that the experimental evidence is too weak to support such a conclusion. In a more recent study Svedružić and colleagues conclude that such direct transfer is a real phenomenon, but they sound a note of caution:

Our results also show that it is impossible to design experiments that can conclusively analyze substrate channeling in cells if we do not understand the underlying molecular principles and the properties of the related enzymes.

=== Physiological effects of metabolite channeling ===
It is sometimes suggested, for example by Ovádi, that metabolite channeling decreases the concentration of metabolite in free solution. However, it has also been argued that there is no net effect on the free concentration in steady-state conditions, a claim disputed by others. More recent authors consider this and other questions about channeling to be unresolved: "Substrate channeling in vivo has also been a subject of yet to be resolved debates," or they recognize that an effect on free concentration exists, but is "generally small."

== See also ==
- Enzyme kinetics
- Enzyme assay
- Enzyme catalysis
