= Hill Carrow =

American-born sports tourism executive

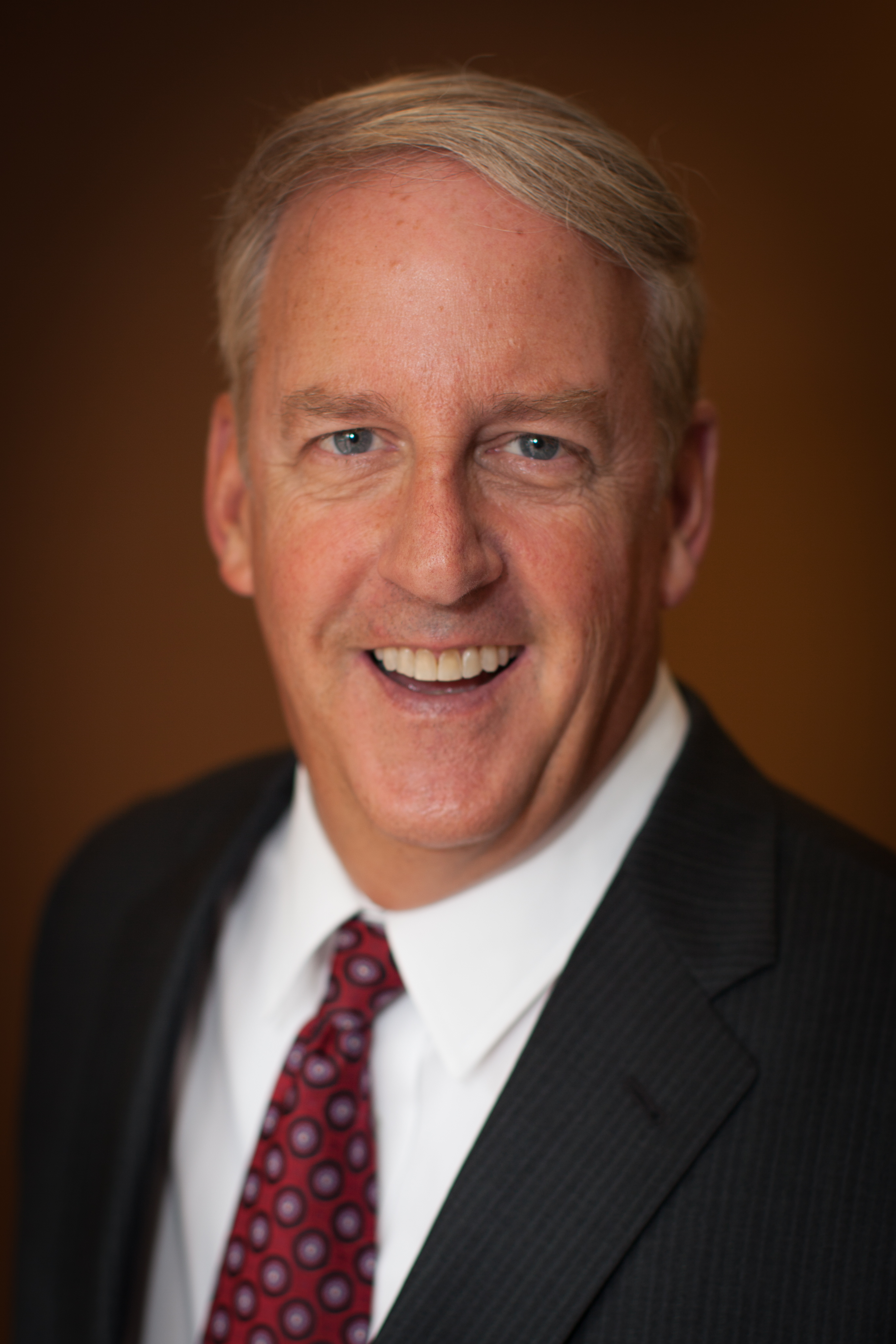
- Born: January 3, 1955 (age 71); Washington, D.C., U.S.
- Education: University of North Carolina at Chapel Hill, 1977; Columbia Law School, 1980
- Occupations: CEO, Sports & Properties, Inc.

Harvey Hill Carrow Jr. (born January 3, 1955) is an American sports tourism executive who has led the development of the sports tourism industry in the United States. He founded the National Association of Sports Commissions, now known as the Sports Events & Tourism Association, the national trade association for the sports tourism industry in the U.S. Carrow also founded the North Carolina Sports Association, the state trade association for the sports tourism industry in North Carolina.

In addition, Carrow founded one of the earliest sports commissions in the country with the establishment of North Carolina Amateur Sports in 1983, an organization that continues today as the owner and operator of the largest multi-sport event in North Carolina, the State Games of North Carolina, one of the longest-running continuous state games programs in the U.S. Carrow founded those Games, developing the event and was the Executive Director for the initial Games in 1986. Business North Carolina magazine deemed Carrow, "a pro at promoting amateur sports."

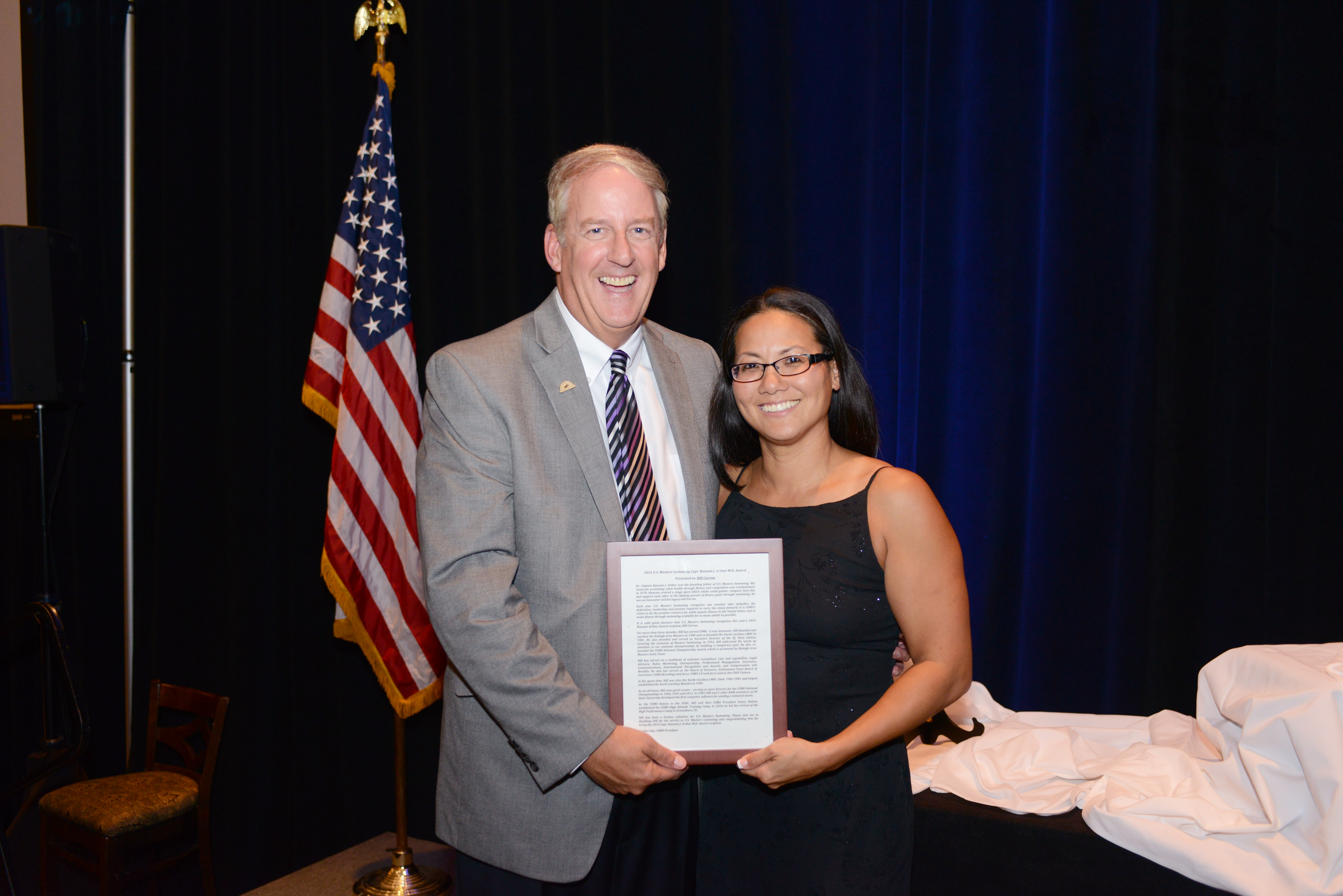
U.S. Masters Swimming President, Nadine Day, presents Ransom Arthur Award to Carrow at the 2014 U.S. Aquatic Sports National Convention in Jacksonville, Florida.

A lifelong athlete in the sport of swimming, from collegiate competition at the University of North Carolina at Chapel Hill to U.S. Masters Swimming today, he was the recipient in 2014 of US Masters Swimming’s Ransom Arthur Award, the governing body’s highest award, often equated to the lifetime achievement award for the sport.

His sports tourism leadership record includes being chairman or president for national and international events from 1986 to present including the 1987 U.S. Olympic Festival, an event of the United States Olympic Committee often referred to as “America’s Olympics” and the second largest event in the southeastern U.S. (behind the Atlanta 1996 Summer Olympics).

He is co-author of the 1987 U.S. Olympic Festival book.

Carrow is CEO of the Triangle Sports Commission, the regional sports commission for the Raleigh, Durham, Chapel Hill, and Cary area of North Carolina.

In this capacity he was responsible for the recruitment of USA Baseball, the sport governing body for Baseball in the U.S., to North Carolina from Arizona and leading the $13 million development of the USA Baseball National Training Complex and Headquarters in Cary and Durham, NC.

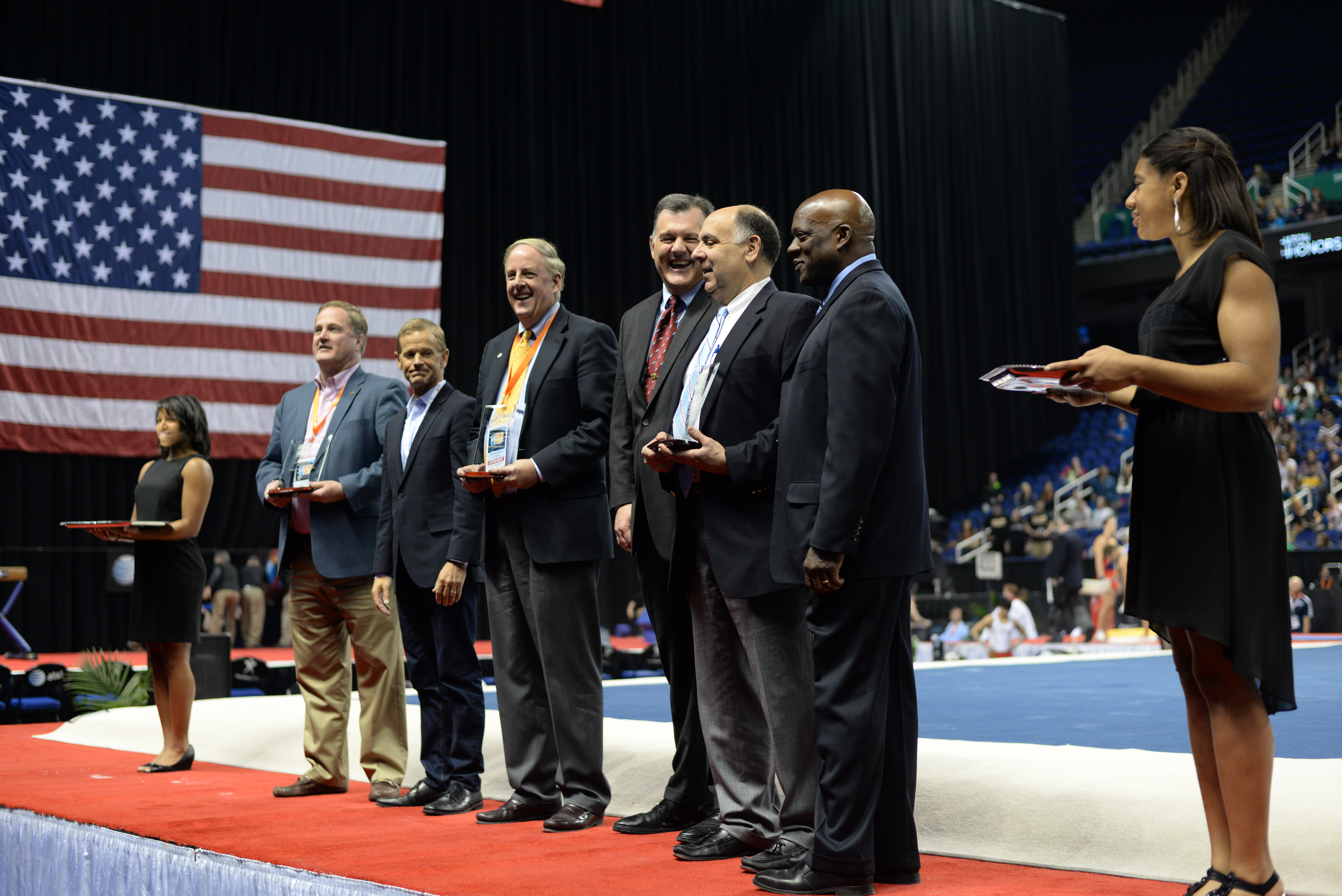
USA Gymnastics accolades at AT&T American Cup for record-setting performance

Additional events led include the 2011 U.S. Figure Skating Championships, the 2012 USA Table Tennis Olympic Trials, the 2012 U.S. Masters Swimming Spring National Championships, the 2012 North America Olympic Trials – Table Tennis, the 2014 AT&T American Cup International Gymnastics Championships, the 2014 Nastia Liukin Cup Gymnastics Championships, the 2014 African Youth Games, the 2015 U.S. Figure Skating Championships, the 2015 North America Caribbean Rugby Association Sevens Championships & Olympic Qualifying Tournament, the 2015 USA Gymnastics Championships, the 2016 Masters Swimming Spring National Championships, and the 2016 U.S. Table Tennis Olympic Trials.

Carrow's production of the 2015 Prudential U.S Figure Skating Championships garnered two international awards, including the top award, at the 2015 SportsTravel Magazine's World Best Sporting Event Awards. The Championship won in the category of Best Amateur Multi-discipline or Multi-sport Event and went on to capture the sport tourism industry's highest award, Event of the Year.

Carrow also founded and led the inaugural USA Masters Games, the National Sports Festival for Adult Athletes, which featured 24 sports and was held July 22–31, 2016 in Greensboro, NC. The second edition of the USA Masters Games were held in San Diego, California. Carrow's production of the USA Masters Games won the Best New Event Award at the World's Best Sports Events Awards presented in Orlando, October, 31. 2017.

For 10 years, from 2011 to 2021, Carrow founded and led the U.S. Masters Swimming High Performance Camp, the only training camp of its kind in the world, drawing national and international adult swimming athletes for elite coaching and specialized training at the Greensboro Aquatic Center.

In March 2017 Carrow was recognized for his longstanding contributions to, and achievements in, the sports tourism industry with his induction into the inaugural class of the National Association of Sports Commissions Sports Tourism Hall of Fame.

Since 2017, Carrow has led the following events: 2018 USA Gymnastics Championships, 2019 & 2020 USA Water Polo Olympic Development Program Eastern Championships, 2019 American Cup International Gymnastics, 2019 Nastia Liukin Cup Gymnastics Championships, 2019 Elite Team Cup Gymnastics Championships, 2019 NBC Sports Network Sticks and Stones Celebrity Curling, 2019 Curling Night in America, 2019 National Collegiate Table Tennis Championships, and the 2020 U.S. Figure Skating Championships. For the U.S. Figure Skating Championships Carrow became the first person in the 106-year history of the event to direct the Local Organizing Committee for the Championships three times within a decade.

More recent events include the Southern Africa Youth Games in December 2020 in Maseru, Lesotho, Africa; the US Masters Swimming Spring National Championships in May 2021 in Greensboro, NC; the USA Masters Games in June of 2021 in Grand Rapids, MI; Major League Cricket in July 2023 in Morrisville, NC; and the USA Track & Field Masters Outdoor National Championships in July 2023 at NC A&T State University in Greensboro, NC.

For his accomplishments both in the pool and for the sport, Carrow was inducted into the North Carolina Swimming Hall of Fame in 2018. In 2020 he was inducted into the George Whitfield Baseball Clinic Hall of Fame. Also in 2020, Carrow’s achievements in sports tourism were recognized with the Sports Event Planners and Industry Professionals Readers Choice Award.

Carrow was the Chairman & CEO of North Carolina's Bid for the World University Games from 2018 to 2023. The World University Games are the largest event for student athletes on the planet and the second-largest (behind only the Summer Olympic Games) global Olympic multi-sport event in the world.

On January 10, 2023, in Lake Placid, NY, just prior to the opening of the 2023 Winter World University Games in that city, the International University Sports Federation (FISU), the international governing body for the World University Games, awarded the 2029 FISU World University Games Summer to North Carolina USA.

The 2029 World University Games in North Carolina will be held in the Triangle and Triad regions of state, with five host cities – Raleigh, Durham, Chapel Hill, Cary, and Greensboro – and as many as 13 or more host universities including Duke University, NC A&T State University, NC State University, North Carolina Central University, University of North Carolina Chapel Hill, and University of North Carolina Greensboro, among others. Carrow is chairman and CEO for the 2029 World University Games.

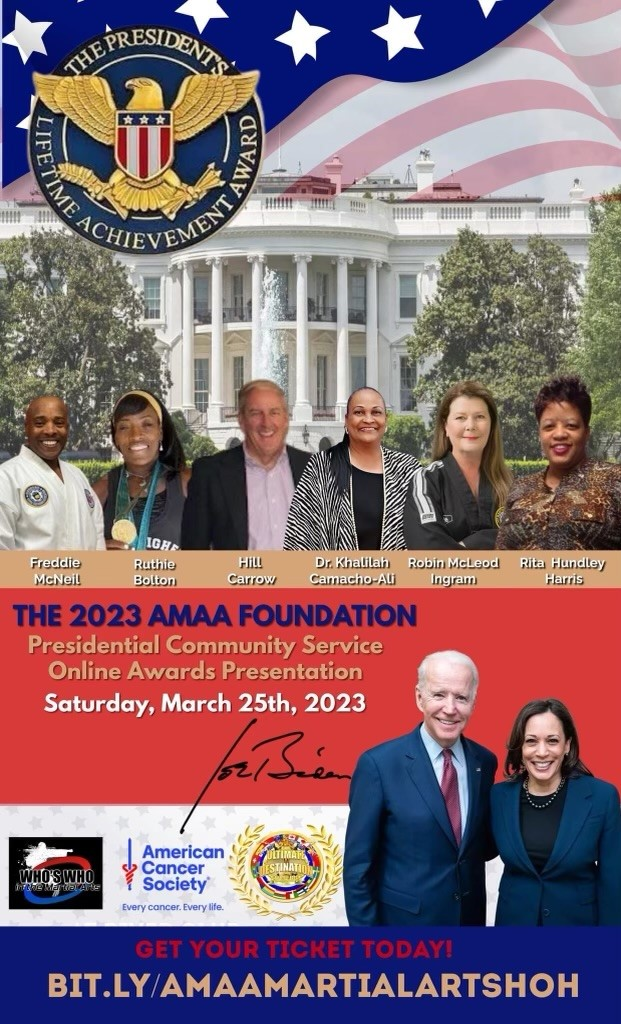
Hill Carrow received the President's Lifetime Achievement Award for Volunteer Service on March 25, 2023.

Carrow has been recognized in 2023 with the Presidents Lifetime Achievement Award, the Morrisville Chamber of Commerce Small Business of the Year Award, the National Sports Events & Tourism All-Star Award, the Cary Chamber of Commerce Small Business of the Year Award, and the Triangle Business Journal Corporate Leadership Award.
