= Metabolon =

Phenomenon in biochemistry

In biochemistry, a metabolon is a temporary structural-functional complex formed between sequential enzymes of a metabolic pathway, held together both by non-covalent interactions and by structural elements of the cell, such as integral membrane proteins and proteins of the cytoskeleton.

The formation of metabolons allows the intermediate product from one enzyme to be passed (channelling) directly into the active site of the next consecutive enzyme of the metabolic pathway. The citric acid cycle is an example of a metabolon that facilitates substrate channeling. Another example is the dhurrin synthesis pathway in sorghum, in which the enzymes assemble as a metabolon in lipid membranes. During the functioning of metabolons, the amount of water needed to hydrate the enzymes is reduced and enzyme activity is increased.

== History ==
The concept of structural-metabolic cellular complexes was first conceived in 1970 by A. M. Kuzin of the USSR Academy of Sciences, and adopted in 1972 by Paul A. Srere of the University of Texas for the enzymes of the citric acid cycle. This hypothesis was well accepted in the former USSR and further developed for the complex of glycolytic enzymes (Embden-Meyerhof-Parnas pathway) by B.I. Kurganov and A.E. Lyubarev. In the mid-1970s, the group of F.M. Clarke at the University of Queensland, Australia also worked on the concept. The name "metabolon" was first proposed in 1985 by Paul Srere during a lecture in Debrecen, Hungary.

== The case of Fatty Acid Synthesis ==
In Chaetomium thermophilum, a complex of a metabolon exists between fatty acid synthase and a MDa carboxylase, and was observed using chemical cross-linking coupled to mass spectrometry and visualized by cryo-electron microscopy. The Fatty acid synthesis metabolon in C. thermophilum is highly flexible, and although a high-resolution structure of Fatty acid synthase was possible, the metabolon was highly flexible, hindering high-resolution structure determination.

== Examples ==
Metabolic pathways in which formation of metabolons occurs
Metabolic pathway	Events supporting metabolon's formation
DNA biosynthesis	A, B, C, E, F
RNA biosynthesis	A, B, C, E, F
Protein biosynthesis	A, B, C, D, E
Glycogen biosynthesis	C, E
Pyrimidine biosynthesis	A, C, D, F
Purine biosynthesis	A, E
Lipid biosynthesis	A, B, C, H
Steroid biosynthesis	A, C, E
Metabolism of amino acids	A, B, D, H
Glycolysis	A, B, C, D, I
Citric acid cycle	B, C, D, E, G
Fatty acids oxidation	A, B, C, D
Electron transport chain	C, I
Antibiotic biosynthesis	A, E
Urea cycle	B, D
cAMP degradation	A, D, E
A – Channeling, B – Specific protein-protein interactions, C – Specific protein – membrane interactions, D – Kinetic effects, E – Multienzyme complexes identified, F – Genetic proofs, G – Operative modeled systems, H – Identified multifunctional proteins, I – Physico-chemical proofs.

== See also ==
- Enzyme kinetics
- Enzyme assay
- Enzyme catalysis
