= National Register of Historic Places listings in Wayne County, North Carolina =

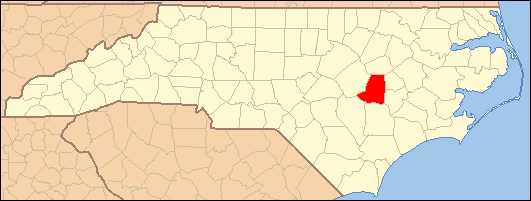

This list includes properties and districts listed on the National Register of Historic Places in Wayne County, North Carolina. Click the "Map of all coordinates" link to the right to view an online map of all properties and districts with latitude and longitude coordinates in the table below.

== Current listings ==
This National Park Service list is complete through NPS recent listings posted April 24, 2026.

	Name on the Register	Image	Date listed	Location	City or town	Description
1	Charles B. Aycock Birthplace		February 26, 1970 (#70000482)	6 miles from jct. of SR 1542 and U.S. 117; 35°31′11″N 77°58′30″W	Fremont	
2	Barnes-Hooks Farm		September 1, 1995 (#95001072)	414 Stuckey Rd. 35°34′15″N 77°59′05″W	Fremont	
3	Borden Manufacturing Company	Borden Manufacturing Company	February 2, 2005 (#04001583)	800 and 801 N. William St. 35°23′32″N 77°59′20″W	Goldsboro	
4	Eureka United Methodist Church		August 26, 1982 (#82003520)	Church St. 35°32′40″N 77°52′47″W	Eureka	
5	First Presbyterian Church	First Presbyterian Church	May 29, 1979 (#79003340)	111 W. Ash St. 35°23′10″N 77°59′50″W	Goldsboro	
6	Former U.S. Post Office		June 2, 1995 (#95000670)	124 W. James St. 35°11′50″N 78°04′01″W	Mount Olive	
7	L. D. Giddens and Son Jewelry Store	L. D. Giddens and Son Jewelry Store	March 19, 1979 (#79001763)	135 S. Center St. 35°22′56″N 77°59′52″W	Goldsboro	
8	Goldsboro Union Station	Goldsboro Union Station	April 13, 1977 (#77001015)	101 North Carolina St. 35°23′05″N 78°00′15″W	Goldsboro	
9	Goldsboro Woman's Club		December 7, 2022 (#100008464)	116 North William St. 35°23′00″N 77°59′35″W	Goldsboro	
10	Harry Fitzhugh Lee House		March 1, 1984 (#84002542)	310 W. Walnut St. 35°23′03″N 78°00′11″W	Goldsboro	
11	Mount Olive High School		October 22, 1998 (#98001266)	100 Wooten St. 35°12′01″N 78°04′23″W	Mount Olive	
12	Mount Olive Historic District		May 27, 1999 (#99000639)	Roughly bounded by Park Ave., Wooten, Nelson, and Johnson Sts. 35°11′42″N 78°04′09″W	Mount Olive	
13	Odd Fellows Lodge	Odd Fellows Lodge	August 3, 1978 (#78001984)	111-115 N. John St. 35°23′00″N 77°59′43″W	Goldsboro	
14	Perry-Cherry House		March 13, 1986 (#86000392)	308 W. Main St. 35°11′50″N 78°04′14″W	Mount Olive	
15	Southerland-Burnette House		February 8, 1988 (#88000057)	201 N. Chesnut St. 35°11′51″N 78°04′04″W	Mount Olive	
16	Uzzell-Best Farm		September 7, 2023 (#100009228)	1361 New Hope Rd. 35°22′12″N 77°52′38″W	La Grange vicinity	
17	Vernon		October 9, 1974 (#74001387)	Address Restricted	Mount Olive	Demolished
18	Solomon and Henry Weil Houses	Solomon and Henry Weil Houses	December 22, 1976 (#76001350)	204 and 200 W. Chestnut St. 35°22′56″N 78°00′00″W	Goldsboro	
19	Dred and Ellen Yelverton House		August 27, 2009 (#09000662)	1979 NC 222 E. 35°33′36″N 78°00′28″W	Fremont	

== See also ==
- National Register of Historic Places listings in North Carolina
- List of National Historic Landmarks in North Carolina
