= John David Gullett =

American architect

John David Gullett (born 1875 or 1880; died 1935) was an American architect based in Goldsboro in Wayne County, North Carolina. He practiced in North Carolina from 1920 until his death in 1935. Several of his works are listed on the National Register of Historic Places (NRHP).

It has been asserted that he "is chiefly remembered for the Colonial- and Classical Revival-style dwellings he designed in Goldsboro." Thirteen works by Gullett in North Carolina, all built of brick between 1922 and 1935, are known to have survived to 2000. "Of these, the former Mount Olive High School remains one of his most significant designs in its utilatarian yet refined treatment of Classical Revival decoration and form." That school has also been described as Gullett's "most ambitious undertaking".

Gullett was born either in 1875 or 1880 in Amite City, Louisiana. Per his 1935 obituary he trained as an architect in Mississippi. By 1908 he was an architect in Birmingham, Alabama, partnering with Daniel Helmich (1854-1917) who designed the 1901 Birmingham City Hall and retired in 1913. Gullett had an office in the Brown-Marx Building in Birmingham in 1910, at which time he was living with Daniel Helmich and Helmich's wife. Gullett married sometime during 1910-1912, and became a draftsman for architect H.B. Wheelock in 1912. He left that employment by 1917 and was again practicing on his own in 1917. The Wheelock Building, a brick Classical Revival style commercial building designed by Wheelock's firm, has exterior details similar to those of Gullett's later non-residential works in North Carolina. Gullett took and passed North Carolina's Architectural Board exam in 1920 in order to practice in North Carolina, which he did until his death in 1935.

Works include:

- John Clifford Grimsley House (c.1916), 432 10th St., Fayette, Alabama, NRHP-listed. Deemed the best (and only) high-style Classical Revival-style house in Fayette County.
- Lee-Gaylor House (by 1922), Goldsboro, NC, Colonial Revival
- John R. Taylor House (by 1922), Goldsboro, NC, Colonial Revival
- Harry Fitzhugh Lee House (1922), 310 W. Walnut St., Goldsboro, NC, NRHP-listed Colonial Revival in style.
- Dillard High School (1922), 431 W. Elm St., Goldsboro, Wayne County, North Carolina, a school for African Americans, was probably but not certainly designed by Gullett.
- Mount Olive High School (Former) (1925), 100 Wooten St., Mount Olive, Wayne County, North Carolina, NRHP-listed
- Jesse S. Claypoole House (1925), New Bern, Craven County, North Carolina
- Nahunta School (1928), Nahunta, Wayne County, North Carolina. Classical Revival in style.
- Eureka Teacherage (1928), a teacherage in Eureka, Wayne County, North Carolina
- Faison Thomson House (1929), Goldsboro, NC
- Herman Weil House (1935), Goldsboro, NC
- New Hope School (1935), outside of Goldsboro, in Wayne County, NC, completed after Gullett's death

Gullett died of a heart attack on October 19, 1935, in North Carolina. His remains were buried in the Woodlawn Cemetery in Birmingham, Alabama. After his death Allen J. Maxwell, Jr., "thought to have been Gullett's protege, took over Gullett's unfinished commissions."
