= Fitzhugh Lee (disambiguation) =

Fitzhugh Lee (1835–1905) was the 40th Governor of Virginia and United States Army general.

Fitzhugh Lee or Fitz Lee may also refer to

- Fitzhugh Lee III (1905–1992), Vice Admiral in the United States Navy, grandson of Fitzhugh Lee
- Fitz Lee (Medal of Honor) (1866–1899), United States Army soldier

== See also ==
- W. H. F. Lee (William Henry Fitzhugh Lee, 1837–1891), general in the American Civil War and congressman from Virginia
- Harry Fitzhugh Lee House in North Carolina, U.S.
