= O'Berry Neuro-Medical Center =

Coordinates: 35.400°N 78.037°W

The O'Berry Neuro-Medical Center is a public hospital in Goldsboro, North Carolina, United States, owned by the North Carolina Department of Health and Human Services. Its original goal was to help the intellectually disabled achieve independence by teaching them self-help skills and productive vocations. It has recently expanded its focus to include those who are either elderly or medically fragile along with having an intellectual disability.

The facility now serves a 23-county South Central Region and handles 144 residents. It is one of three Neuro-Medical Treatment Centers in North Carolina, the others being Longleaf (formerly Wilson) and Black Mountain.

== History ==
The facility traces its origins to a commission created in 1943 by Governor Joseph Broughton to study the "condition, care, treatment and training" of black intellectually disabled citizens at Goldsboro State Hospital (now Cherry Hospital). The facility opened in November 1957 with 150 black intellectually disabled clients. It desegregated in 1966.

== Sources ==
- Official webpage at North Carolina Division of Mental Health
- Phyllis Moore (October 22, 2007). "O'Berry gets set for 50th anniversary celebration". Goldsboro News-Argus.
