= Barber & Kluttz =

American architectural firm

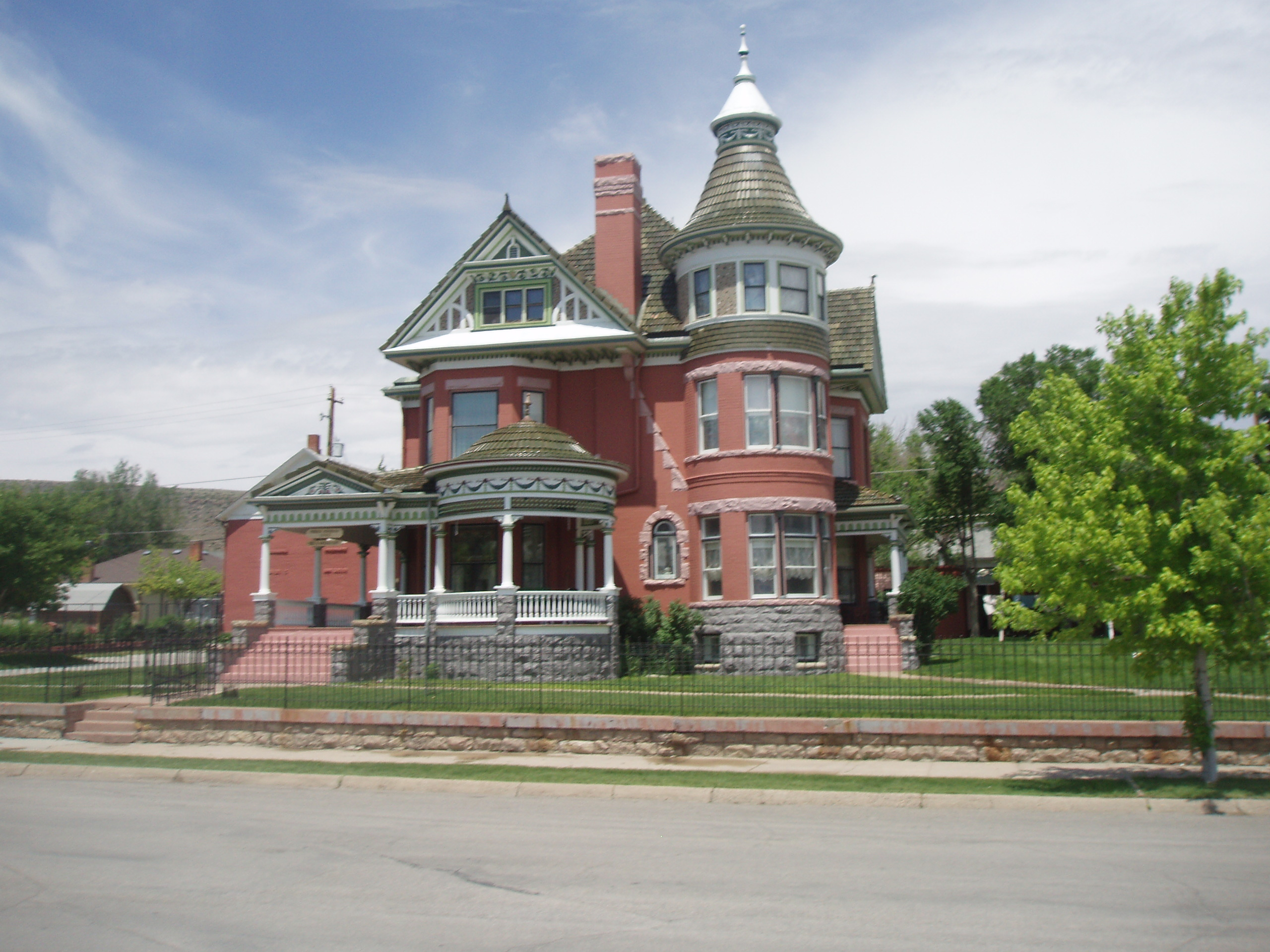
George Ferris Mansion, Rawlins, Wyoming

Barber & Kluttz, spelled often as Barber & Klutz, was an architectural firm of Knoxville, Tennessee that produced pattern books used across the United States. It was a partnership of George Franklin Barber (1854 – 1915) of Tennessee and Thomas A. Kluttz of Georgia.

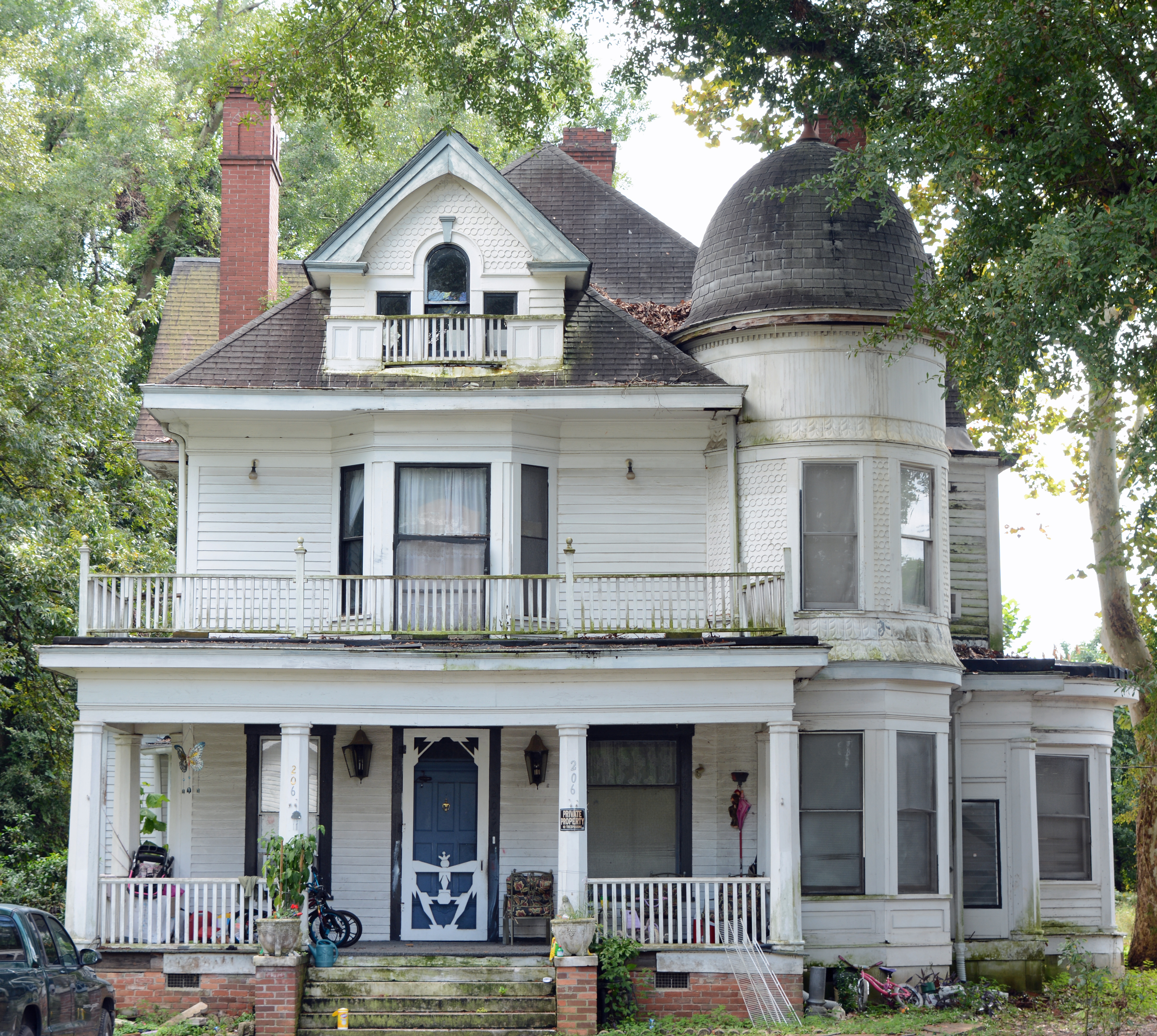
Lonnie A. Pope house, on the NRHP

A number of works using its designs are listed on the U.S. National Register of Historic Places.

Works include:

- George Ferris Mansion, 607 W. Maple St., Rawlins, Wyoming (Barber & Kluttz), NRHP-listed
- James L. Fleming House, 302 S. Greene St., Greenville, North Carolina (Barber & Kluttz), NRHP-listed
- Orth C. Galloway House, 504 Park St., Clarendon, Arkansas (Barber & Kluttz), NRHP-listed
- Dred and Ellen Yelverton House, 1979 NC 222 E., Fremont, North Carolina (Barber & Kluttz), NRHP-listed
- Annamede, RD 1, Box 126, US 19, Walkersville, West Virginia (Barber & Kluttz), NRHP-listed
- Robert L. Covington House, 240 S. Extension St., Hazlehurst, Mississippi (Barber & Kluttz), NRHP-listed
- Fairchild House, 302 S. Main St., Monticello, Kentucky (Barber & Kluttz), NRHP-listed
- First National Bank of Greenville, Main and S. Poplar Sts., Greenville, Mississippi (Barber & Kluttz), NRHP-listed
- Lonnie A. Pope House, Jackson St. and Central of Georgia RR tracks, Douglas, Georgia (Barber & Kluttz), NRHP-listed
- Dr. R.P. Anderson House (1903), 665 N. Main St., in North Main Street Historic District of Mocksville, North Carolina (Barber & Kluttz), NRHP-listed

== See also ==
- List of George Franklin Barber works, which includes some of these and other Barber works not involving partnership with Kluttz, without distinction
