= Mt. Olive Pickle Company =

American food processing company

- Type: Private
- Industry: Food processing
- Founded: 1926
- Founder: Shikrey Baddour and George Moore
- Headquarters: Mount Olive, North Carolina, United States
- Products: pickled cucumbers, mixed pickle, relish, and other pickled products
- Website: www.mtolivepickles.com

The Mt. Olive Pickle Company is an American food processing company located in Mount Olive, North Carolina. The company's primary product is pickled cucumbers, but it also is a large supplier of relish, mixed pickle, and other pickled vegetables. In 2024, the company began producing a gourmet line of pickles, relishes and peppers under its Majestic brand.

The headquarters and production facilities are located in Mount Olive on 250 acres (100 ha) with 1,500,000 square feet (140,000 m^{2}) of production and warehouse space. Mt. Olive sells more than 230 million jars of pickles, peppers and relishes per year and employs more than 1,200 people in North Carolina. The company is privately owned.

An analysis of nationwide pickle consumption in 2024 by the delivery service Instacart found Mt. Olive was the top-selling brand, followed by Vlasic, Claussen and Oh Snap! The analysis found pickle preferences varied regionally, with Mt. Olive most popular in the South and Vlasic on top in the Midwest and most of the West.

== History ==
The company's roots date back to the mid-1920s, when Shikrey Baddour, a Lebanese immigrant from nearby Goldsboro, first saw opportunity in the wasted cucumber crops of area farmers. Baddour came up with the idea of buying the cucumbers, putting them in a brining tank, and selling the brined cucumbers, or brine stock, to other pickle firms. Baddour enlisted the aid of George Moore, who had worked in a pickle plant. But they found no buyers for their product.

In 1926, Mount Olive business leader I.F. Witherington developed a new plan to pack and sell pickles and re-launched the company. Thirty-seven shareholders invested $19,500 to get the company started in what they called a "community proposition."

The 1926 certificate of incorporation filed with the state of North Carolina showed a broad vision for the company: “For the manufacture and sale of pickles of all kinds either wholesale or retail or both, in bulk or packed…For the manufacture and sale of canned fruits and vegetables of all kinds, jams, jellies, preserves and condiments, either wholesale or retail or both, in bulk or packed.” The company could “either grow or purchase the raw product at its discretion.”

The board of directors hired H.M. Cox as president, Moore as factory superintendent and Baddour as salesman and gave them each shares of stock for their initial investments. The board also purchased 1-acre (4,000 m^{2}) of land from farmer J.A. Westbrook for $1,000, which is part of the modern manufacturing site. Westbrook's home still stands across from the plant.

In 1999, farmworkers in the Farm Labor Organizing Committee (FLOC), a trade union, launched a boycott of Mt. Olive products to protest the pay and conditions for cucumber pickers. The boycott ended in 2004 after the company made a commitment to increase the amount it paid for cucumbers and growers pledged to raise wages for workers who picked the vegetables. After the agreement was signed at a Raleigh church, Mt. Olive President Bill Bryan said, “I am one pickle packer who is glad to be out of a pickle today.”

In February 2017, the EPA fined the Mt. Olive Pickle Company $131,856 for violating the Clean Water Act between 1992 and 2016. A consent agreement said the company discharged industrial stormwater through a pipe that emptied onto the roads that were central to the company’s marketing — Cucumber Boulevard and Vine Street.

In the summer of 2026, the company decided to withdraw from the North Carolina exhibit at the Great American State Fair Washington, D.C. after the display of a Confederate flag. "We are proud of our North Carolina roots, and we agreed to be a part of an exhibit, as presented to us, that would represent the best of our great state," Mt. Olive said in a statement. "We were unaware that an image of the Confederate flag was included in a video as part of this exhibit, and we have withdrawn our participation. Our company stands on values of human dignity, opportunity, and freedom." A spokesperson for the North Carolina exhibit said the image was not authorized and was removed.

== Marketing ==
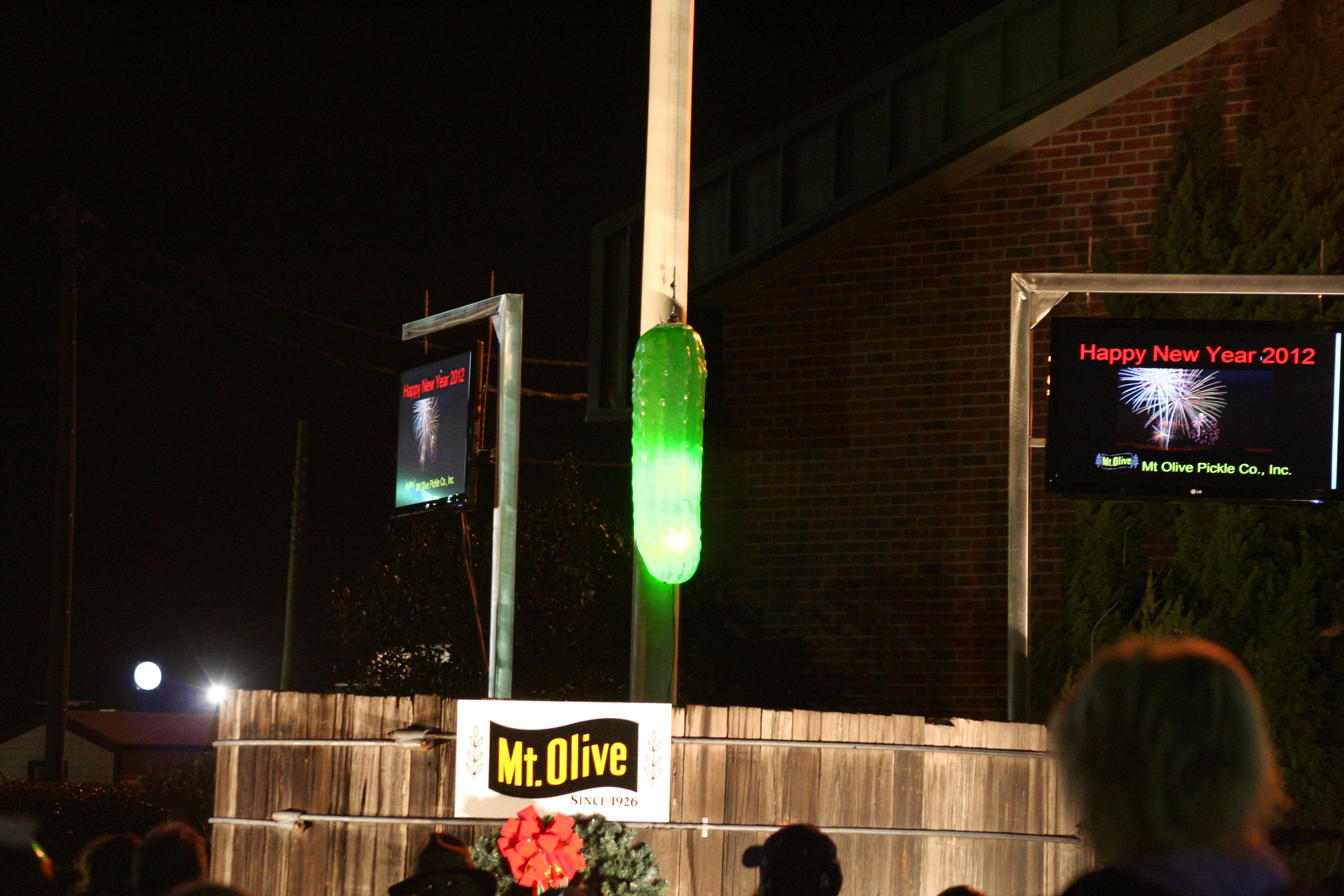
2012 pickle drop

The Mt. Olive Pickle Company uses its hometown as a key element of its marketing. One of its slogans, “From the corner of Cucumber and Vine,” refers to the address of its headquarters.

The company also holds annual events in Mount Olive to promote its pickles. Each year the company is one of the primary sponsors of the North Carolina Pickle Festival. The 2025 event included a car show, a costume contest, a pickle eating contest and a pickleball tournament.

Each New Year's Eve, the company sponsors a “pickle drop” in which a glowing green 3-foot (1 m)-high pickle is lowered on a flagpole at 7 p.m. EST (midnight Greenwich Mean Time). Attendees are encouraged to bring donations for a local food bank.
