= Rachel Darden Davis =

American politician and physician

Member of the North Carolina House of Representatives
- In office 1959–1963

Personal details
- Born: Kathryn Rachel Sarah Rebecca Speight Darden Davis; September 24, 1905 Seven Springs, North Carolina, U.S.
- Died: October 10, 1979 (aged 74) Kinston, North Carolina, U.S.
- Party: Democratic
- Children: 1
- Education: Salem College (BS); Columbia University (MS); Woman's Medical College of Pennsylvania (MD)
- Occupation: politician physician

Kathryn Rachel Sarah Rebecca Speight Darden Davis (September 24, 1905 – October 10, 1979), commonly known as Rachel Darden Davis, was an American politician and physician. She was the first woman from Eastern North Carolina elected to the North Carolina General Assembly, sitting in the North Carolina House of Representatives as a representative of Lenoir County from 1959 to 1963.

== Early life and education ==
Davis was born on September 24, 1905, in Seven Springs, North Carolina, to Herbert W. Davis and Harriette Isler Davis. She attended the James Sprunt Institute and Mount Olive High School.

In 1926, she graduated from Salem College with a Bachelor of Science degree and went onto attend the University of North Carolina from 1927 to 1928. She transferred to Columbia University, obtaining a Master of Science degree in 1928, and earned a medical degree from the Woman's Medical College of Pennsylvania in 1932.

== Career ==
=== Medicine ===
Davis was on staff at Parrott Memorial Hospital in Kinston, North Carolina from 1934 to 1957 and worked at the Lenoir Memorial Hospital in Kinston from 1946 until 1979. She specialized in obstetrics and gynecology.

In 1972, she served as a delegate to the International Cancer Congress in Moscow. She was a member of the American Cancer Society.

=== Politics ===
In 1959, Davis was elected to represent Lenoir County in the North Carolina House of Representatives, becoming the first woman from Eastern North Carolina to sit in the North Carolina General Assembly. She was the thirteenth woman elected to the general assembly. Davis served as a state representative until 1963. During her three terms in office, she backed legislation that supported fertility and reproductive health, food access, cancer research, and adoption rights for single people. She served on the Water and Air Resources Board, the Commission of Correction and Detention, the Lenoir County Welfare Board, the Kinston Recreation Board, and served as chairwoman of the Dobbs Farm Board.

She helped establish Lenoir Community College.

Davis was the only Democrat invited to attend the inauguration of Republican Governor James Holshouser in 1973.

== Personal life ==
Davis had been raised in the Baptist tradition and served as a deacon before converting to Episcopalianism.

She adopted a daughter, Harriette Elizabeth Davis, and raised her as a single mother.

Davis was a member of the Business and Professional Women's Club, the Daughters of the American Revolution, the Daughters of the American Colonists, the United Daughters of the Confederacy, and the Magna Charta Dames. She was also a supporter of the North Carolina Arts Council.
