= Eureka, North Carolina =

- Town
- Location within the state of North Carolina
- Coordinates: 35°32′29″N 77°52′35″W
- Country: United States
- State: North Carolina
- County: Wayne

Area
  - Total: 0.34 sq mi (0.89 km^{2})
  - Land: 0.34 sq mi (0.89 km^{2})
  - Water: 0 sq mi (0.00 km^{2})
- Elevation: 125 ft (38 m)

Population (2020)
  - Total: 214
  - Density: 626.1/sq mi (241.74/km^{2})
- Time zone: UTC-5 (Eastern (EST))
  - Summer (DST): UTC-4 (EDT)
- ZIP code: 27830
- Area code: 919
- FIPS code: 37-21960
- GNIS feature ID: 2406469

Eureka is a town in Wayne County, North Carolina, United States. As of the 2020 census, Eureka had a population of 214. It is included in the Goldsboro, North Carolina Metropolitan Statistical Area.

== History ==
The Town of Eureka, NC was originally incorporated in 1879 as the Town of Saul's Cross Roads (PrL 1879-90) and the name was changed to Town of Eureka in 1901 (PrL 1901-186).

The Eureka United Methodist Church was listed on the National Register of Historic Places in 1982.

On January 24, 1961, a B-52 bomber transporting two extremely powerful nuclear bombs crashed 3 miles south from the center of the city. The bombs were all recovered, however, one uranium component of the second bomb was lost in the crash. It is still buried in the ground today. A sign was erected in the center of the city recounting the story.

In 2019, the NC General Assembly suspended the charter for the town in order for the State to come in and assist it with problems including upgrades to the local sewer system. The finances and administration of the Town currently fall under the duties of the State Treasurer. The suspension of the charter runs through June 30, 2024, but is subject to extension, if needed.

== Geography ==
According to the United States Census Bureau, the town has a total area of 0.4 square miles (1.0 km^{2}), all of it land.

== Demographics ==
Historical population
Census	Pop.	Note	%±
1900	123		—
1910	162		31.7%
1920	187		15.4%
1930	198		5.9%
1940	194		−2.0%
1950	192		−1.0%
1960	246		28.1%
1970	263		6.9%
1980	303		15.2%
1990	282		−6.9%
2000	244		−13.5%
2010	197		−19.3%
2020	214		8.6%
U.S. Decennial Census

As of the census of 2000, there were 244 people, 108 households, and 72 families residing in the town. The population density was 683.5 inhabitants per square mile (263.9/km^{2}). There were 124 housing units at an average density of 347.3 per square mile (134.1/km^{2}). The racial makeup of the town was 76.23% White and 23.77% African American. Hispanic or Latino of any race were 3.69% of the population.

There were 108 households, out of which 21.3% had children under the age of 18 living with them, 50.9% were married couples living together, 12.0% had a female householder with no husband present, and 33.3% were non-families. 32.4% of all households were made up of individuals, and 18.5% had someone living alone who was 65 years of age or older. The average household size was 2.24 and the average family size was 2.79.

In the town, the population was spread out, with 19.3% under the age of 18, 7.0% from 18 to 24, 23.4% from 25 to 44, 26.2% from 45 to 64, and 24.2% who were 65 years of age or older. The median age was 45 years. For every 100 females, there were 95.2 males. For every 100 females age 18 and over, there were 80.7 males.

The median income for a household in the town was $29,545, and the median income for a family was $36,250. Males had a median income of $26,500 versus $31,875 for females. The per capita income for the town was $14,396. About 9.1% of families and 11.6% of the population were below the poverty line, including 10.8% of those under the age of eighteen and 13.0% of those 65 or over.

== Education ==
Education in Eureka is administered by the Wayne County Public Schools system with children attending schools in nearby townships. Higher education is offered through Wayne Community College in Goldsboro.

== Transportation ==
=== Passenger ===
- Air: Eureka is served through nearby Kinston Regional Jetport (IATA: ISO, ICAO: KISO) with service to Orlando, Florida. Raleigh-Durham International Airport is the closest major airport with service to more than 45 domestic and international destinations. Goldsboro-Wayne Municipal Airport is an airport located nearby, but is only used for general aviation.
- Eureka is not served directly by passenger trains. The closest Amtrak station is located in Wilson.
- Bus: The area is served by Greyhound with a location in nearby Goldsboro.

=== Roads ===
- The main highways in Eureka are NC 111 and NC 222.
- Interstate Highway: I-795 is the closest Interstate to Eureka, which is located 6.5 miles west in Fremont.
