= Annamede =

Historic house in West Virginia, United States

- U.S. National Register of Historic Places
- Location within West Virginia Location within the United States
- Location: RD 1, Box 126, U.S. Route 19, near Walkersville, West Virginia
- Coordinates: 38°52′35″N 80°26′35″W
- Area: 120 acres (49 ha)
- Built: 1901
- Architect: Barber & Kluttz
- Architectural style: Classical Revival
- NRHP reference No.: 87000218
- Added to NRHP: March 11, 1987

"Annamede", also known as Davisson-Blair Farm, is a historic home located near Walkersville, Lewis County, West Virginia. It was built in 1901 and is a 2 1/2-story 17-room red-brick mansion in the Classical Revival style. The front facade features a massive two-story portico supported by large fluted Corinthian order columns. It also has a one-story front porch that extends 3/4 of the way around each side. Also on the property are a contributing carriage house, smoke house, caretaker's cottage, stone grotto and goldfish pond, and three farm outbuildings.

It was listed on the National Register of Historic Places in 1987.
