= Perry-Cherry House =

Historic house in North Carolina, United States

- U.S. National Register of Historic Places
- U.S. Historic district – Contributing property
- Location within North Carolina Location within the United States
- Location: 308 W. Main St., Mount Olive, North Carolina
- Coordinates: 35°11′50″N 78°4′14″W
- Area: less than one acre
- Built: c. 1904, c. 1933-1936
- Architectural style: Colonial Revival, Classical Revival
- NRHP reference No.: 86000392
- Added to NRHP: March 13, 1986

Perry-Cherry House is a historic home located at Mount Olive, Wayne County, North Carolina. It was built about 1904 and altered in 1933–1936. It is a two-story, three-bay, frame dwelling with Classical Revival and Colonial Revival style elements. It has a nearly pyramidal hip roof and hip roofed rear two-story ell. The front facade features a two-story Classical semi-circular portico which is supported by monumental Ionic order columns. It was the home of L. G. and Bessie Welling Geddie, original investors in the Mt. Olive Pickle Company.

It was listed on the National Register of Historic Places in 1986. It is located in the Mount Olive Historic District.
