= Fairchild House (Monticello, Kentucky) =

- U.S. National Register of Historic Places
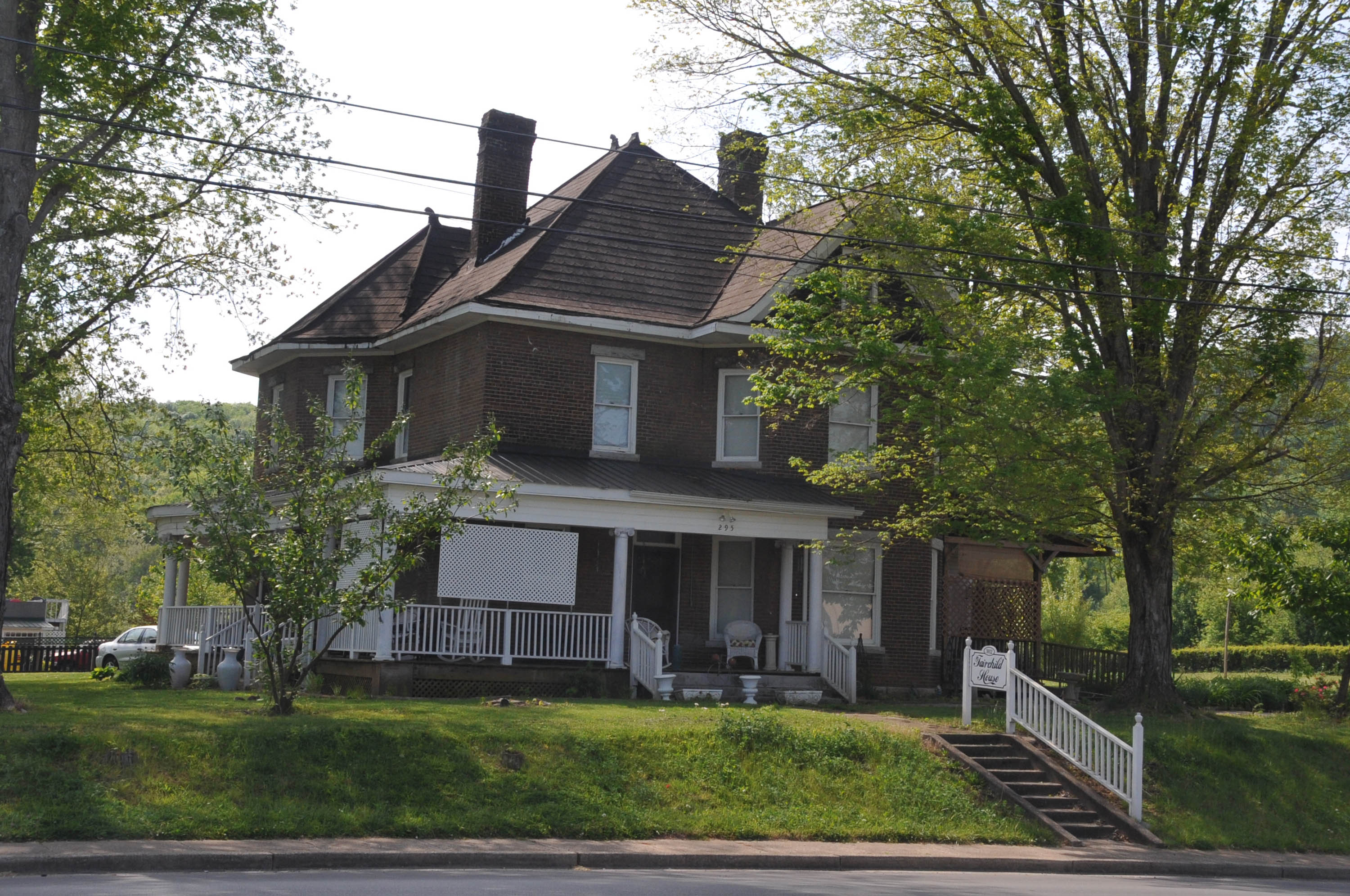
- Photographed in 2012

- Location within Kentucky Location within the United States
- Location: 302 S. Main St., Monticello, Kentucky
- Coordinates: 36°49′33″N 84°51′09″W
- Area: 1.2 acres (0.49 ha)
- Built: 1906
- Architect: Barber & Kluttz
- Architectural style: Queen Anne
- NRHP reference No.: 08000215
- Added to NRHP: March 25, 2008

The Fairchild House on S. Main Street in Monticello, Kentucky, United States, is a Queen Anne-style house built in 1905-06 for Wilburn Fillmore Fairchild, a banker and prominent local merchant. It was listed on the National Register of Historic Places in 2008.

It is a two-story brick house, in Queen Anne style with elements of Free Classic substyle, based on plans of Barber & Kluttz, architects of Knoxville, Tennessee who published pattern books that were distributed widely.

It has been operated as a bed and breakfast, as Fairchild's Bed & Breakfast.
