= John Clifford Grimsley House =

- U.S. National Register of Historic Places
- Interactive map of John Clifford Grimsley House
- Location: 432 10th St., Fayette, Alabama
- Built: 1916
- Architectural style: Neoclassical
- NRHP reference No.: 16000834
- Added to NRHP: August 3, 2018

The John Clifford Grimsley House is a historic residence in Fayette, Alabama, United States. It was listed on the National Register of Historic Places in 2018.

== History ==
John Clifford Grimsley was born in Henry County, Alabama, in 1872. He went into business with his brothers working in the naval stores in south Alabama and the Florida Panhandle. In 1909 while living in Falco, Alabama, Grimsley and his brothers purchased the Fayette County Bank and relocated to the town of Fayette. They built a new bank building, which was destroyed in a fire in 1911 that also destroyed most of downtown Fayette. In addition to the bank, the Grimsleys owned a horse and mule trading business and a mill, gin, and ice company.

In 1915, Grimsley purchased 19 acres (7.7 ha) of land north of town and built a house that was completed the following year. Grimsley died in 1959, and his wife gave the property to their daughter, Emily, in 1971. Emily died in 2013, and as of 2018, the property was owned by her two daughters.

== Architecture ==
The house was designed by North Carolina architect John David Gullett in Classical Revival style. It is a two story brick veneer structure with a hipped roof and large dormers on the front and rear. The façade has a full-height recessed porch, supported by four fluted Ionic columns. The windows on the first floor have limestone lintels topped with arched stucco panels and keystones. A second-floor balcony sits above the central entrance, which has sidelights and a fan light.

The entrance opens into a large living room, with a dining room, bedroom, breakfast room, kitchen, and a small pantry on also on the first floor. The second floor has a has a center-hall plan, with three bedrooms and a bathroom. The house retains most of its original detailing, including wooden crown moulding, baseboards, and door and window surrounds, and varnished single-panel doors. The living room, dining room, and first floor bedroom have original fireplace mantels with tile inserts.
