= First Presbyterian Church (Goldsboro, North Carolina) =

Historic church in North Carolina, United States

- U.S. National Register of Historic Places
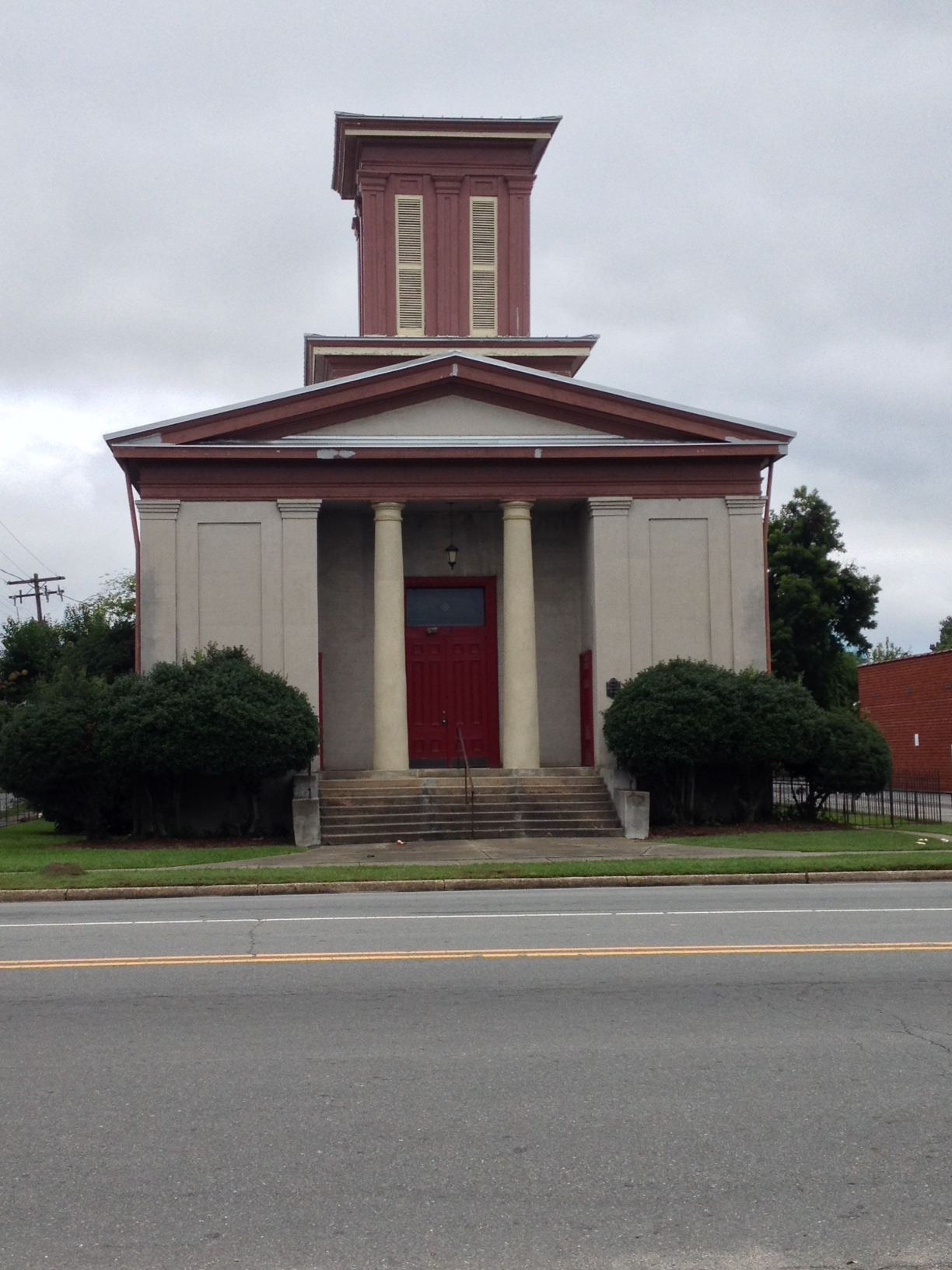

- Location within North Carolina Location within the United States
- Location: 111 W. Ash St., Goldsboro, North Carolina
- Coordinates: 35°23′10″N 77°59′50″W
- Area: less than one acre
- Built: 1856
- Architectural style: Greek Revival
- NRHP reference No.: 79003340
- Added to NRHP: May 29, 1979

First Presbyterian Church, also known as the Church of Christ, Scientist, is a historic Presbyterian church located at 111 W. Ash Street in Goldsboro, Wayne County, North Carolina. It was built in 1856, and is a one-story, stuccoed, temple form Greek Revival architecture style church. It features an in antis portico with Tuscan order columns and low pitched roof with a painted wooden cupola. In 1953, the building was sold to the Christian Science Society.

It was listed on the National Register of Historic Places in 1979.
