= Vernon (Mount Olive, North Carolina) =

Historic house in North Carolina, United States

- U.S. National Register of Historic Places
- Nearest city: Mt. Olive, North Carolina
- Area: 9 acres (3.6 ha)
- Architectural style: Federal
- NRHP reference No.: 74001387
- Added to NRHP: October 9, 1974

Vernon, also known as the Anna Maria Ward House, was a historic plantation house located near Mount Olive, Wayne County, North Carolina. It was built about 1837, and was a two-story, five bay by two bay, Federal style frame dwelling. It sat on a brick pier foundation and one-story shed porch that replaced a mid-19th century two-story porch of Italianate design. It has been demolished.

It was listed on the National Register of Historic Places in 1974.
