= Aycock Birthplace =

Historic house in North Carolina, United States

- Charles B. Aycock Birthplace
- U.S. National Register of Historic Places
- Location within North Carolina Location within the United States
- Location: 6 miles from jct. of SR 1542 and U.S. 117, near Fremont, North Carolina
- Coordinates: 35°31′13.7″N 77°58′36.5″W
- Built: ca. 1840
- MPS: Wayne County MRA (AD)
- NRHP reference No.: 70000482
- Added to NRHP: February 26, 1970

The Aycock Birthplace, also known as the Charles B. Aycock Birthplace, is a historic home in Wayne County, North Carolina, and a historic site belonging to the North Carolina Department of Natural and Cultural Resources' Historic Sites division. The property was the location of the birth of Governor Charles Brantley Aycock in 1859, and exhibits at the historic site serve to tell the story of the Governor's political career and the education reforms he enacted while in office. It was built about 1840, and is a one-story weatherboard dwelling on a brick pier foundation. It has a gable roof and exterior end chimneys.

It was listed on the National Register of Historic Places in 1970.
