= Southerland-Burnette House =

Historic house in North Carolina, United States

- U.S. National Register of Historic Places
- U.S. Historic district – Contributing property
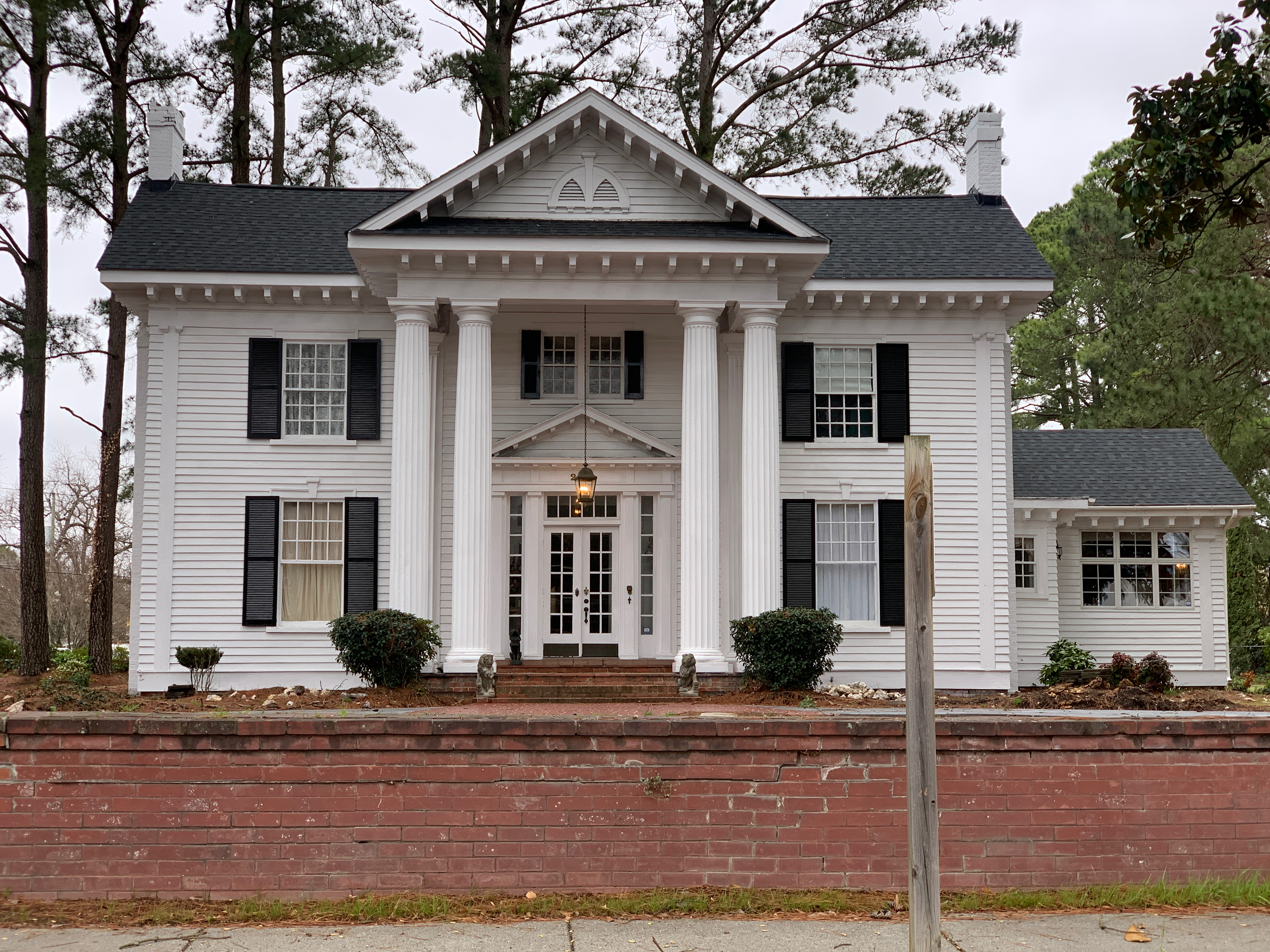
- Front of the house in 2022

- Location within North Carolina Location within the United States
- Location: 201 N. Chestnut St., Mount Olive, North Carolina
- Coordinates: 35°11′51″N 78°4′4″W
- Area: 0.8 acres (0.32 ha)
- Built: c. 1874, 1924
- Architectural style: Classical Revival
- NRHP reference No.: 88000057
- Added to NRHP: February 8, 1988

Southerland-Burnette House is a historic home in the Mount Olive Historic District in Mount Olive, Wayne County, North Carolina. It was built about 1874 and extensively altered in 1924 in the Classical Revival style. It is a two-story, three-bay, frame dwelling with a gable roof. The front facade features a two-story tetra-style portico with Tuscan order columns.

It was listed on the National Register of Historic Places in 1988.
