= Solomon and Henry Weil Houses =

Historic houses in North Carolina, United States

- U.S. National Register of Historic Places
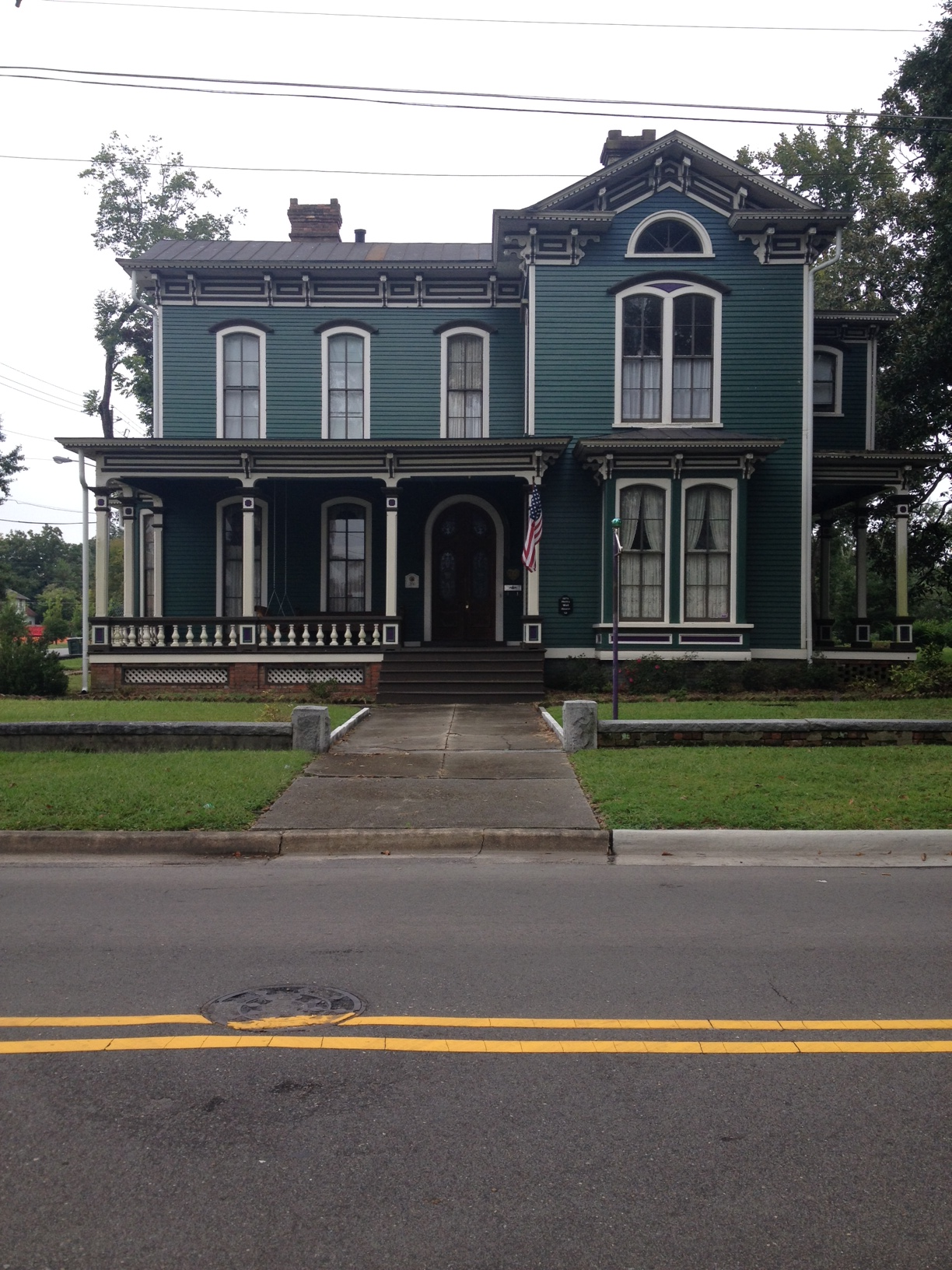
- Henry Weil house, September 2014

- Location within North Carolina Location within the United States
- Location: 204 and 200 W. Chestnut St., Goldsboro, North Carolina
- Coordinates: 35°22′54″N 78°59′58″W
- Area: less than one acre
- Built: 1875
- Architectural style: Late Victorian
- NRHP reference No.: 76001350
- Added to NRHP: December 22, 1976

The Solomon and Henry Weil Houses are two historic homes located at Goldsboro, Wayne County, North Carolina. They were built in 1875 for two brothers, and are nearly identical two-story, rectangular, Late Victorian frame dwellings. They feature projecting bays, bay windows, porches, and verandahs. Social activist Gertrude Weil, Henry's daughter, grew up in the house at 200 W. Chestnut St.

They were listed on the National Register of Historic Places in 1976.
