= L. D. Giddens and Son Jewelry Store =

Historic building in North Carolina, US

- U.S. National Register of Historic Places
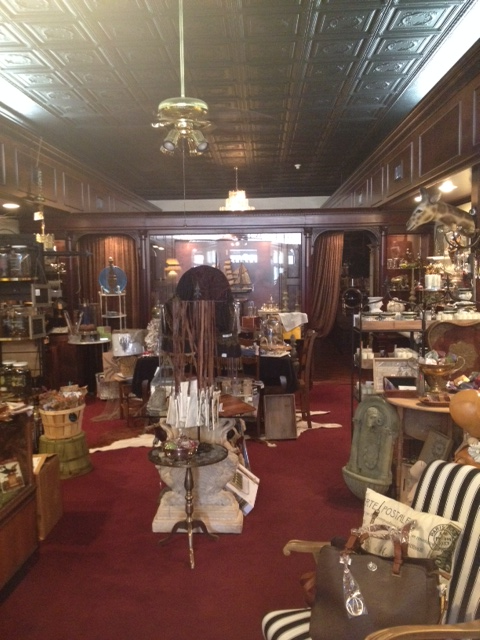
- L. D. Giddens and Son Jewelry Store interior, September 2014

- Location within North Carolina Location within the United States
- Location: 135 S. Center St., Goldsboro, North Carolina
- Coordinates: 35°22′56.3″N 77°59′51.8″W
- Area: less than one acre
- Built: 1839-1847, c. 1870, 1926, 1959
- Architectural style: Early Commercial
- NRHP reference No.: 79001763
- Added to NRHP: March 19, 1979

L. D. Giddens and Son Jewelry Store is a historic commercial building located at Goldsboro, Wayne County, North Carolina. It was built between 1839 and 1847, and is a two-story, three-bay, brick building. It measures 104 feet long and 23 feet, 6 inches wide. It features cast iron ornamentation and a freestanding clock (1877) at the street measuring 14 feet high. L. D. Giddens and Son was founded in 1859 and may be the oldest jewelry store in North Carolina.

It was listed on the National Register of Historic Places in 1979.
