= Odd Fellows Lodge (Goldsboro, North Carolina) =

Historic building in North Carolina, US

- U.S. National Register of Historic Places
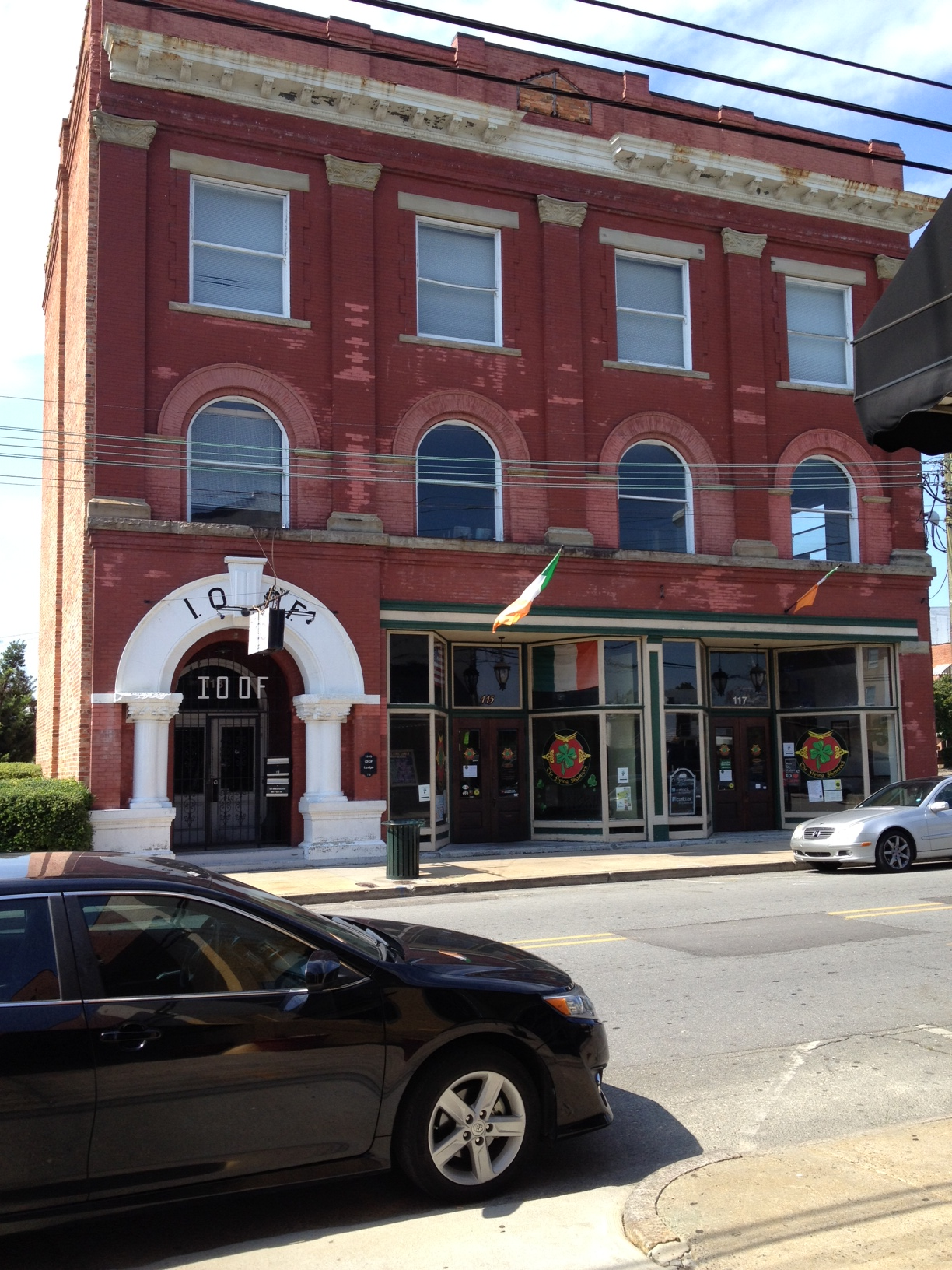

- Location within North Carolina Location within the United States
- Location: 111--115 N. John St., Goldsboro, North Carolina
- Coordinates: 35°22′59″N 77°59′27″W
- Area: less than one acre
- Built: 1906
- Architect: Porter, E.G.
- Architectural style: Classical Revival, Romanesque
- NRHP reference No.: 78001984
- Added to NRHP: August 3, 1978

The Odd Fellows Lodge is a historic Odd Fellows clubhouse located at Goldsboro, Wayne County, North Carolina. It was designed by E.G. Porter in Classical Revival and Romanesque styles. It was built in 1906, and is a three-story brick building. It served historically as a clubhouse and as a specialty store.

It was listed on the National Register of Historic Places in 1978.

== Gallery ==
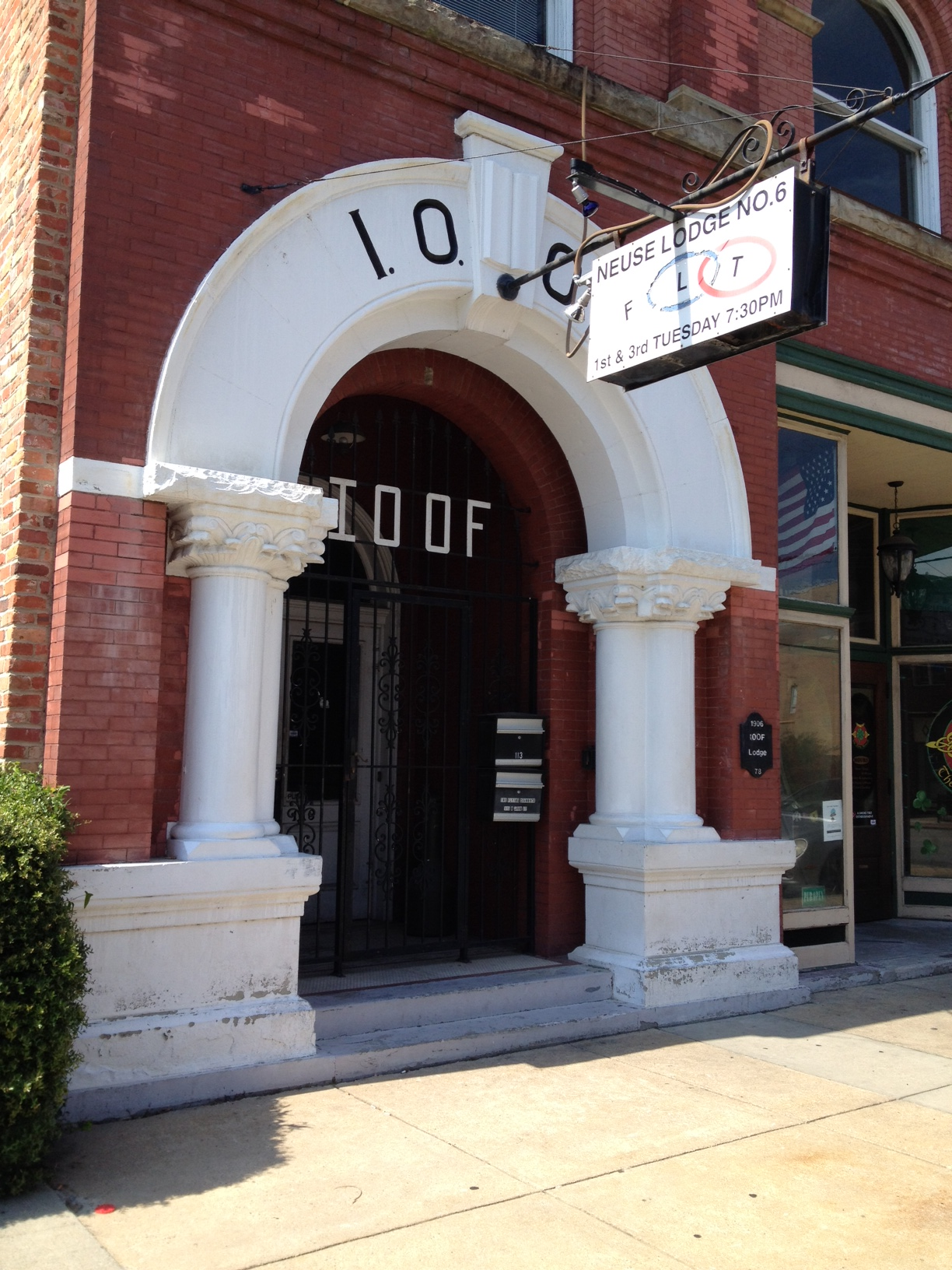
Front entrance to the building

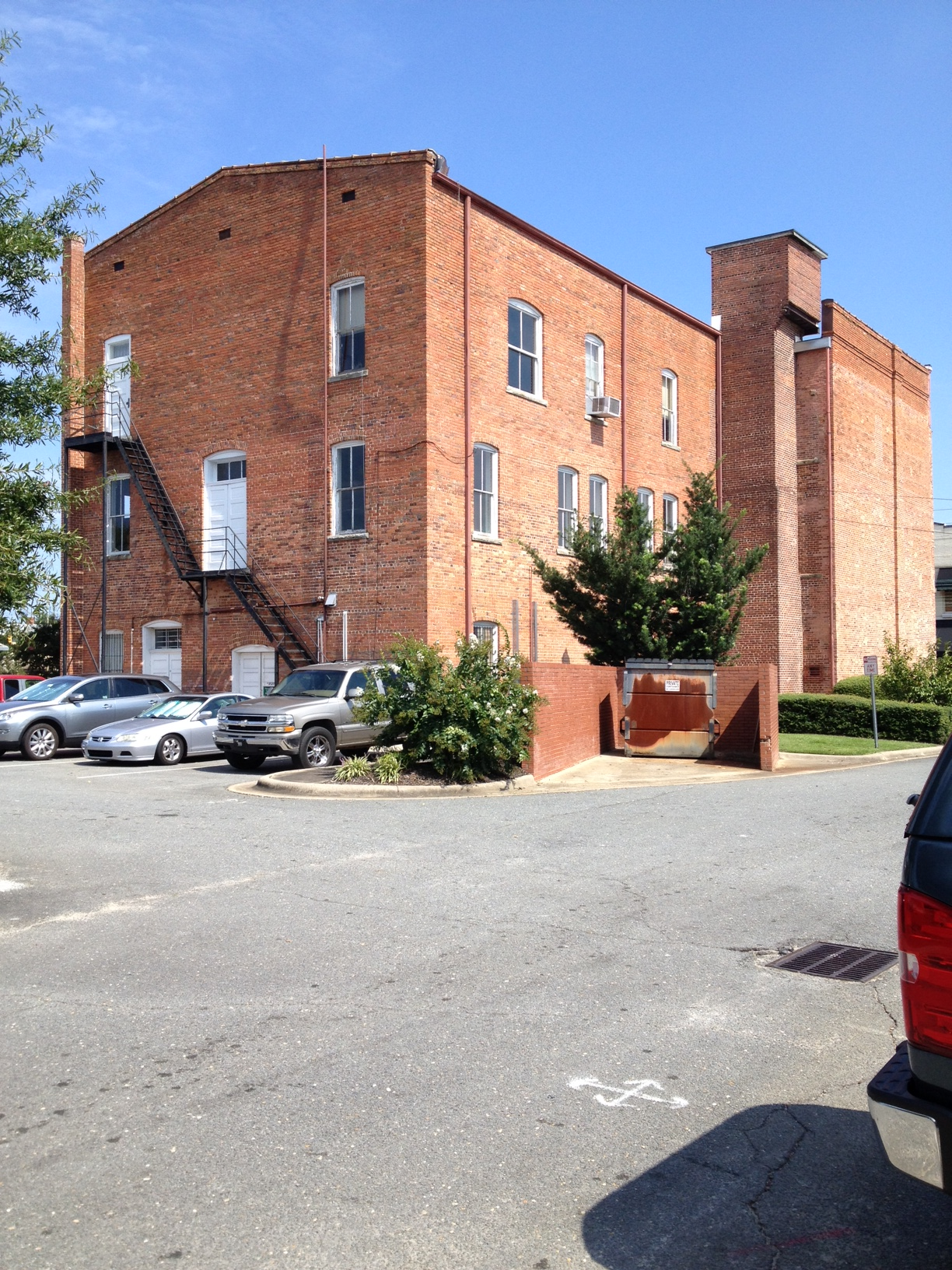
Back of the building
