= Mount Olive, North Carolina =

- Town
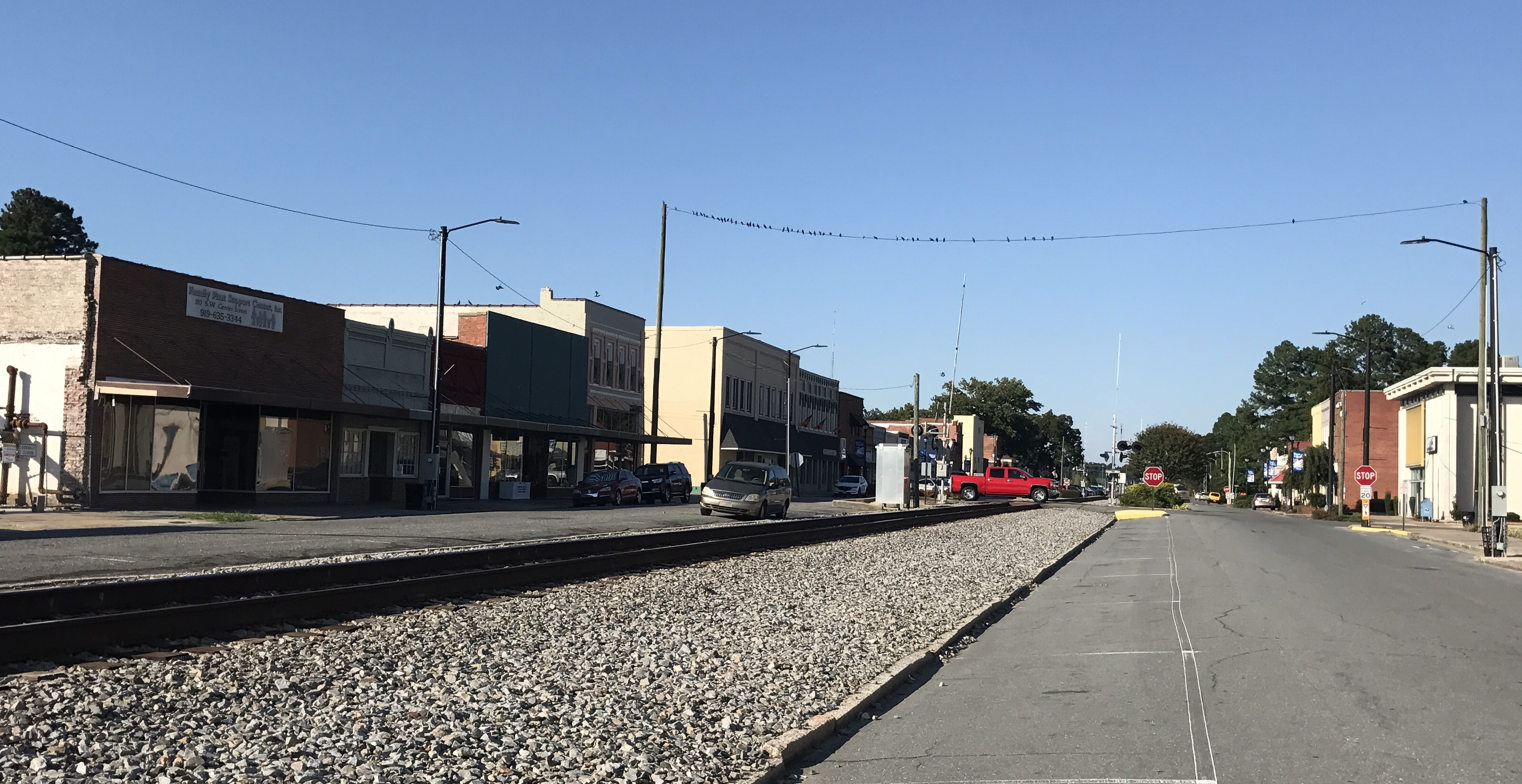
- Downtown Mount Olive in August 2019

- Flag Seal
- Motto: "We Value Hometown Tradition"
- Location within the state of North Carolina
- Coordinates: 35°11′59″N 78°03′58″W
- Country: United States
- State: North Carolina
- Counties: Wayne, Duplin

Area
  - Total: 2.74 sq mi (7.09 km^{2})
  - Land: 2.74 sq mi (7.09 km^{2})
  - Water: 0 sq mi (0.00 km^{2})
- Elevation: 164 ft (50 m)

Population (2020)
  - Total: 4,198
  - Density: 1,533.1/sq mi (591.92/km^{2})
- Time zone: UTC-5 (Eastern (EST))
  - Summer (DST): UTC-4 (EDT)
- ZIP code: 28365
- Area code: 919
- FIPS code: 37-45100
- GNIS feature ID: 2406209
- Website: www.townofmountolivenc.org

Mount Olive is a town in Duplin and Wayne counties in the U.S. state of North Carolina. At the 2020 census, the population was 4,198. It is included in the Goldsboro metropolitan area. The town is home to the Mt. Olive Pickle Company and the University of Mount Olive.

== History ==
The Mount Olive High School (Former), Mount Olive Historic District, Perry-Cherry House, Southerland-Burnette House, former United States Post Office, and Vernon are listed on the National Register of Historic Places.

The Wilmington & Raleigh Railroad (which was renamed the Wilmington & Weldon Railroad in 1855) completed in 1840 ran through Mt. Olive on land sold to the railroad by Adam Winn Sr., a prominent free black landowner. Today the line is part of the CSX W&W Subdivision.

== Geography ==
Mount Olive is located in southern Wayne County with a small portion of the town extending south into Duplin County.

U.S. Route 117, a four-lane highway, runs along the western edge of Mount Olive, leading north 14 miles (23 km) to Goldsboro and south 15 miles (24 km) to Warsaw. North Carolina Highway 55, which crosses US 117 at the northern end of town, leads east 31 miles (50 km) to Kinston and west 17 miles (27 km) to Newton Grove.

According to the United States Census Bureau, the town of Mount Olive has a total area of 2.7 square miles (6.9 km^{2}), all land.

== Demographics ==
Historical population
Census	Pop.	Note	%±
1890	393		—
1900	617		57.0%
1910	1,071		73.6%
1920	2,297		114.5%
1930	2,685		16.9%
1940	2,929		9.1%
1950	3,732		27.4%
1960	4,673		25.2%
1970	4,914		5.2%
1980	4,876		−0.8%
1990	4,582		−6.0%
2000	4,567		−0.3%
2010	4,589		0.5%
2020	4,198		−8.5%
U.S. Decennial Census

=== Racial and ethnic composition ===
Mount Olive town, North Carolina – Racial and ethnic composition Note: the US Census treats Hispanic/Latino as an ethnic category. This table excludes Latinos from the racial categories and assigns them to a separate category. Hispanics/Latinos may be of any race.
Race / Ethnicity (NH = Non-Hispanic)	Pop 2000	Pop 2010	Pop 2020	% 2000	% 2010	% 2020
White alone (NH)	1,907	1,769	1,463	41.76%	38.55%	34.85%
Black or African American alone (NH)	2,465	2,306	2,060	53.97%	50.25%	49.07%
Native American or Alaska Native alone (NH)	7	18	14	0.15%	0.39%	0.33%
Asian alone (NH)	6	12	14	0.13%	0.26%	0.33%
Native Hawaiian or Pacific Islander alone (NH)	1	1	0	0.02%	0.02%	0.00%
Other race alone (NH)	1	8	19	0.02%	0.17%	0.45%
Mixed race or Multiracial (NH)	35	52	93	0.77%	1.13%	2.22%
Hispanic or Latino (any race)	145	423	535	3.17%	9.22%	12.74%
Total	4,567	4,589	4,198	100.00%	100.00%	100.00%

=== 2020 census ===
As of the 2020 census, Mount Olive had a population of 4,198. The median age was 39.3 years. 19.9% of residents were under the age of 18 and 20.3% of residents were 65 years of age or older. For every 100 females there were 86.9 males, and for every 100 females age 18 and over there were 82.9 males age 18 and over.

0.0% of residents lived in urban areas, while 100.0% lived in rural areas.

There were 1,624 households in Mount Olive, including 985 families. Of all households, 28.4% had children under the age of 18 living in them. Of all households, 27.6% were married-couple households, 22.8% were households with a male householder and no spouse or partner present, and 44.2% were households with a female householder and no spouse or partner present. About 38.0% of all households were made up of individuals and 19.8% had someone living alone who was 65 years of age or older.

There were 1,969 housing units, of which 17.5% were vacant. The homeowner vacancy rate was 1.5% and the rental vacancy rate was 6.5%.

=== 2000 census ===
As of the census of 2000, there were 4,567 people, 1,770 households, and 1,125 families residing in the town. The population density was 1,819.3 inhabitants per square mile (702.4/km^{2}). There were 2,012 housing units at an average density of 801.5 units per square mile (309.5 units/km^{2}). The racial makeup of the town was 82.98% White, 12.30% African American, 0.15% Native American, 0.15% Asian, 0.11% Pacific Islander, 1.34% from other races, and 0.96% from two or more races. Hispanic or Latino of any race were 3.17% of the population.

There were 1,770 households, out of which 25.9% had children under the age of 18 living with them, 36.8% were married couples living together, 22.9% had a female householder with no husband present, and 36.4% were non-families. 32.3% of all households were made up of individuals, and 15.8% had someone living alone who was 65 years of age or older. The average household size was 2.38 and the average family size was 3.01.

In the town, the population was spread out, with 22.9% under the age of 18, 14.0% from 18 to 24, 22.8% from 25 to 44, 21.1% from 45 to 64, and 19.2% who were 65 years of age or older. The median age was 38 years. For every 100 females, there were 77.3 males. For every 100 females age 18 and over, there were 71.5 males.

The median income for a household in the town was $23,984, and the median income for a family was $31,176. Males had a median income of $26,814 versus $19,224 for females. The per capita income for the town was $12,184. About 16.4% of families and 22.8% of the population were below the poverty line, including 29.6% of those under age 18 and 21.6% of those age 65 or over.

=== Haitian immigration wave ===
Jim Johnson, a professor at the Kenan-Flagler Business School at University of North Carolina at Chapel Hill, said the new wave of Haitians in Eastern North Carolina is the classic immigrant labor story. "The jobs at Butterball are what we can call 3D: dirty, difficult and dangerous," Johnson said. "Nobody wants to do them, and the immigrants fill the gap."

== Pickles ==
The Mt. Olive Pickle Company, established in 1926, is located on the corner of Cucumber and Vine streets.

The North Carolina Pickle Festival is held the last full weekend of April each year. The annual celebration is put on by both the community of Mount Olive and the Mt. Olive Pickle Company.

On New Year's Eve, the Mt. Olive Pickle Company celebrates in unusual fashion by dropping a three-foot pickle down a flagpole into a pickle tank. However, instead of midnight local time, the drop takes place at 7 p.m. The event first took place on New Year's Eve 1999.

== Area landscape ==
Mount Olive is part of the Atlantic coastal plain.

== Education ==
Education in Mount Olive is administered by the Wayne County Public Schools system. Schools located in the town include Carver Elementary School and Mount Olive Middle School. On the outskirts of town is Southern Wayne High School in Dudley. Higher education is offered through Wayne Community College in Goldsboro and the private, liberal arts institution University of Mount Olive.

== Transportation ==
=== Passenger ===
- Air: Mount Olive is served through Mount Olive Municipal Airport for corporate and general aviation aircraft and nearby Kinston Regional Jetport (IATA: ISO, ICAO: KISO) with service to Orlando, Florida. Raleigh-Durham International Airport is the closest major airport with service to more than 45 domestic and international destinations.
- Mount Olive is not served directly by passenger trains. The closest Amtrak station is located in Selma. CSX freight rail goes through Mount Olive.
- Bus: The area is served by Greyhound with a location in nearby Goldsboro.

=== Roads ===
- The main highways in Mount Olive are US 117 and NC 55.
- Interstate Highway: I-40 is the closest Interstate to Mount Olive, which is located 9 miles south near Faison.

== Notable people ==
- Morrie Aderholt, former MLB player
- Leora Jones, former Team USA handball player who competed at the 1984 Summer Olympics, 1988 Summer Olympics, and 1992 Summer Olympics
- Greg Warren, former NFL long snapper and 2x Super Bowl champion with the Pittsburgh Steelers
