= Dred and Ellen Yelverton House =

Historic house in North Carolina, United States

- U.S. National Register of Historic Places
- Location within North Carolina Location within the United States
- Location: 1979 NC 222 E., near Fremont in Wayne County, North Carolina
- Coordinates: 35°31′58″N 77°54′47″W
- Area: 8.4 acres (3.4 ha)
- Built: c. 1913
- Built by: Dickerson, Claude
- Architect: Barber & Klutz
- Architectural style: Colonial Revival, Queen Anne
- NRHP reference No.: 09000662
- Added to NRHP: August 27, 2009

The Dred and Ellen Yelverton House is a historic home located near Fremont, Wayne County, North Carolina. It was designed by architect George Franklin Barber, is one of the most intact Barber houses in North Carolina. It was built about 1913, and is a two-story, weatherboarded frame dwelling with elements of Queen Anne and Colonial Revival style architecture. It has a steep deck-on-hip slate roof, one-story rear ell, and one- and two-story wraparound verandah. Also on the property is a contributing Carbide House (c. 1913).

The building was listed on the U.S. National Register of Historic Places in 2009.
