= Mount Olive High School (North Carolina) =

Historic school building in North Carolina, United States

- Mount Olive High School (Former)
- U.S. National Register of Historic Places
- U.S. Historic district – Contributing property
- Location within North Carolina Location within the United States
- Location: 100 Wooten St., Mount Olive, North Carolina
- Coordinates: 35°12′1″N 78°4′23″W
- Area: 2.2 acres (0.89 ha)
- Built: 1925
- Architect: B.R. Lucas, John David Gullett
- Architectural style: Classical Revival
- Part of: Mount Olive Historic District (ID99000639)
- NRHP reference No.: 98001266
- Added to NRHP: October 22, 1998

Mount Olive High School is a historic former high school building located at Mount Olive, Wayne County, North Carolina. It was built in 1925, and is a three-story, T-shaped, multicolored tapestry brick school building in the Classical Revival style. It features terra cotta and cast stone exterior details and arched doorways and windows. A two-room brick cafeteria addition was made in 1945–1946. It housed Mount Olive Junior High from 1965 to 1979, after construction of the Southern Wayne High School.

It was probably the most important work by architect John David Gullett.

It was listed on the National Register of Historic Places in 1998 as "Mount Olive High School (Former)". It is also a contributing building in the Mount Olive Historic District, National Register-listed in 1999.

== Notable alumni ==
- Rachel Darden Davis, physician and politician
