= Eureka United Methodist Church =

Historic church in North Carolina, United States

- U.S. National Register of Historic Places
- Location within North Carolina Location within the United States
- Location: Church St., Eureka, North Carolina
- Coordinates: 35°32′40″N 77°52′47″W
- Area: 1 acre (0.40 ha)
- Built: 1884
- Architectural style: Carpenter Gothic
- NRHP reference No.: 82003520
- Added to NRHP: August 26, 1982

Eureka United Methodist Church is a historic Methodist church located on Church Street in Eureka, Wayne County, North Carolina. It was built in 1884, and is a one-story, three bays wide and four bays deep, vernacular Carpenter Gothic style church. It has steeply pitched gable front roof and bell tower with lancet windows.

It was listed on the National Register of Historic Places in 1982.
