= The Goldsboro News-Argus =

Daily U.S. newspaper located in Goldsboro, North Carolina

The Goldsboro News-Argues
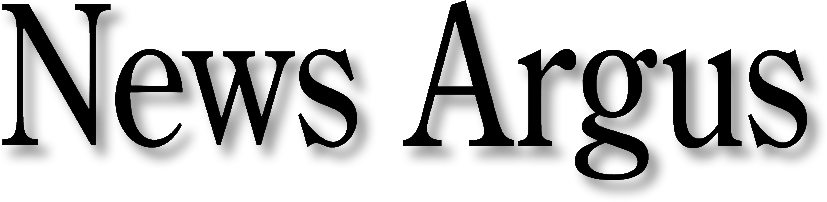
- Type: Daily newspaper
- Format: Broadsheet
- Owner: Paxton Media Group
- Publisher: John McClure
- Editor: Rochelle Moore
- Founded: April 7, 1885; 141 years ago
- Language: American English
- Headquarters: 109 E. Ash St., Goldsboro, North Carolina 27530
- City: Goldsboro, North Carolina
- Country: United States of America
- Circulation: 16,500 Daily; 18,500 Sunday (as of 2020)
- OCLC number: 10454274
- Website: newsargus.com

The Goldsboro News-Argus is an American, English language daily newspaper located in Goldsboro, North Carolina, serving the citizens of Wayne County. The newspaper started in 1885 as the Daily Argus, merging in 1929 with the Goldsboro News, thus combining the title to the Goldsboro News-Argus.

The company also has a telephone directory business, which publishes the Community Yellow Pages of Eastern North Carolina and the Community Phone Book of Wayne County. Additionally, the paper (although officially the Wayne Publishing Company) also publishes the Wright Times, written by and for the inhabitants of the Seymour Johnson Air Force Base and the Roanoke Beacon, a smaller newspaper for Plymouth, North Carolina, which was purchased by the News-Argus in January 2006.

The following quote is associated with the newspaper: "This Argus o'er the people's rights doth an eternal vigil keep. No soothing strains o'Maia's son can lull its hundred eyes to sleep."

== History ==
The Daily Argus was founded on April 7, 1885, in downtown Goldsboro by J.W. Nash and S.O. Kelly. It started as a morning paper with four pages, using a second-hand press. Both Nash and Kelly were the paper's page compositors, as well as the only carriers, delivering the papers on foot. The paper has had the following names:

- Goldsboro News-Argus (Goldsboro, N.C.), 1929–present
- Goldsboro Daily Argus (Goldsboro, N.C.), 1885–1929
- The Goldsboro News (Goldsboro, N.C.), 1922–1929

In 1922, the Argus became an afternoon publication, and in the same year another newspaper, The Goldsboro News was founded. The News was a morning paper, initiated by Roland Beasley, John Beasley, Matt H. Allen, R.E. Powell, W.W. Minton and John D. Langston.

After a man named Talbot Patrick obtained controlling interest over both newspapers in 1929, both papers were merged. During the winter of 1933, the Goldsboro News-Argus completed negotiations to move to a new location, a brick building formerly belonging to the Goldsboro Grocery Company. By May 1934, the new building was put to use, and later in 1964 it underwent renovation and expansion. Patrick continued serving as the paper's publisher until October 1, 1953.

Having outgrown the previous building and its publication capacity, the newspaper had a new building designed by architect Conrad Wessell, which was occupied by 1970.

In October 1953, a North Carolina printing company named Wayne Printing Co., Inc. bought the Goldsboro News-Argus from Patrick and other stockholders. The new publisher and president of the company was Hal H. Tanner Sr, who in turn was succeeded in these roles in 1984 by his son, Hal Tanner Jr., and grandson, Hal H. Tanner III.

In November 2018 Paxton Media Group acquired the Goldsboro News-Argus.

== Changes in the digital age ==
As of July 7, 2009, the newspaper began to charge money for full access to online content. Charging for content was described by General Manager Hal Tanner Jr. as necessary for the newspaper to remain competitive. The announcement that the newspaper would charge for content online was announced by the manager in an open letter posted prominently on the Web site. The newspaper also has a Facebook page for posting news and interacting with readers.

== See also ==
- List of newspapers in North Carolina
