= Mount Olive Historic District =

Historic district in North Carolina, United States

- U.S. National Register of Historic Places
- U.S. Historic district
- Location within North Carolina Location within the United States
- Location: Roughly bounded by Park Ave., Wooten, Nelson, and Johnson Sts., Mount Olive, North Carolina
- Coordinates: 35°11′42″N 78°04′09″W
- Area: 200 acres (81 ha)
- Built: 1838
- Architect: Multiple
- Architectural style: Italianate, Queen Anne, et al.
- NRHP reference No.: 99000639
- Added to NRHP: May 27, 1999

Mount Olive Historic District is a national historic district located at Mount Olive, Wayne County, North Carolina. The district encompasses 465 contributing buildings, 2 contributing structures, and 1 contributing object in the central business district and surrounding residential sections of Mount Olive. It developed between about 1838 and 1949, and includes notable examples of Italianate and Queen Anne style architecture. Located in the district are the separately listed former United States Post Office, Mount Olive High School (Former), Southerland-Burnette House, and Perry-Cherry House. Other notable contributing buildings are the Elms (c. 1849), Mount Olive Presbyterian Church (1916), Carver High School (1941), Wooten & Brothers Building (c. 1903), DeBrutz English House (c. 1900), Center Theatre (1947), Mount Olive Manufacturing Company (1914), Farrior-Wooten House (c. 1900), Mount Olive First United Methodist Church (1911-1913), Mt. Olive Pickle Co. Office (1920), Mount Olive Passenger Depot (c. 1910), and Ebenezer Apostolic Holiness Church (1850).

It was listed on the National Register of Historic Places in 1999.
