= Barnes–Hooks Farm =

Historic farm in North Carolina, United States

- U.S. National Register of Historic Places
- U.S. Historic district
- Location within North Carolina Location within the United States
- Location: 414 Stuckey Rd., near Fremont, North Carolina
- Coordinates: 35°34′15″N 77°59′05″W
- Area: 86 acres (35 ha)
- Built: 1874
- Architectural style: Greek Revival
- NRHP reference No.: 95001072
- Added to NRHP: September 1, 1995

Barnes–Hooks Farm is a historic farm and national historic district located near Fremont, Wayne County, North Carolina. The Hooks House was built about 1874 and is a two-story frame dwelling with Italianate / Greek Revival style detailing. It was built in front of the early-19th century Barnes House and connected to it until the 1920s. The Barnes House is located about 100 feet from the main house and is a hall and parlor house with rear shed rooms. Also on the property is the contributing mule stable and feed barn (c. 1920), tenant house (c. 1920), and tobacco barn (c. 1930).

It was listed on the National Register of Historic Places in 1995.
