= Borden Manufacturing Company =

Historic mill complex in North Carolina, US

- U.S. National Register of Historic Places
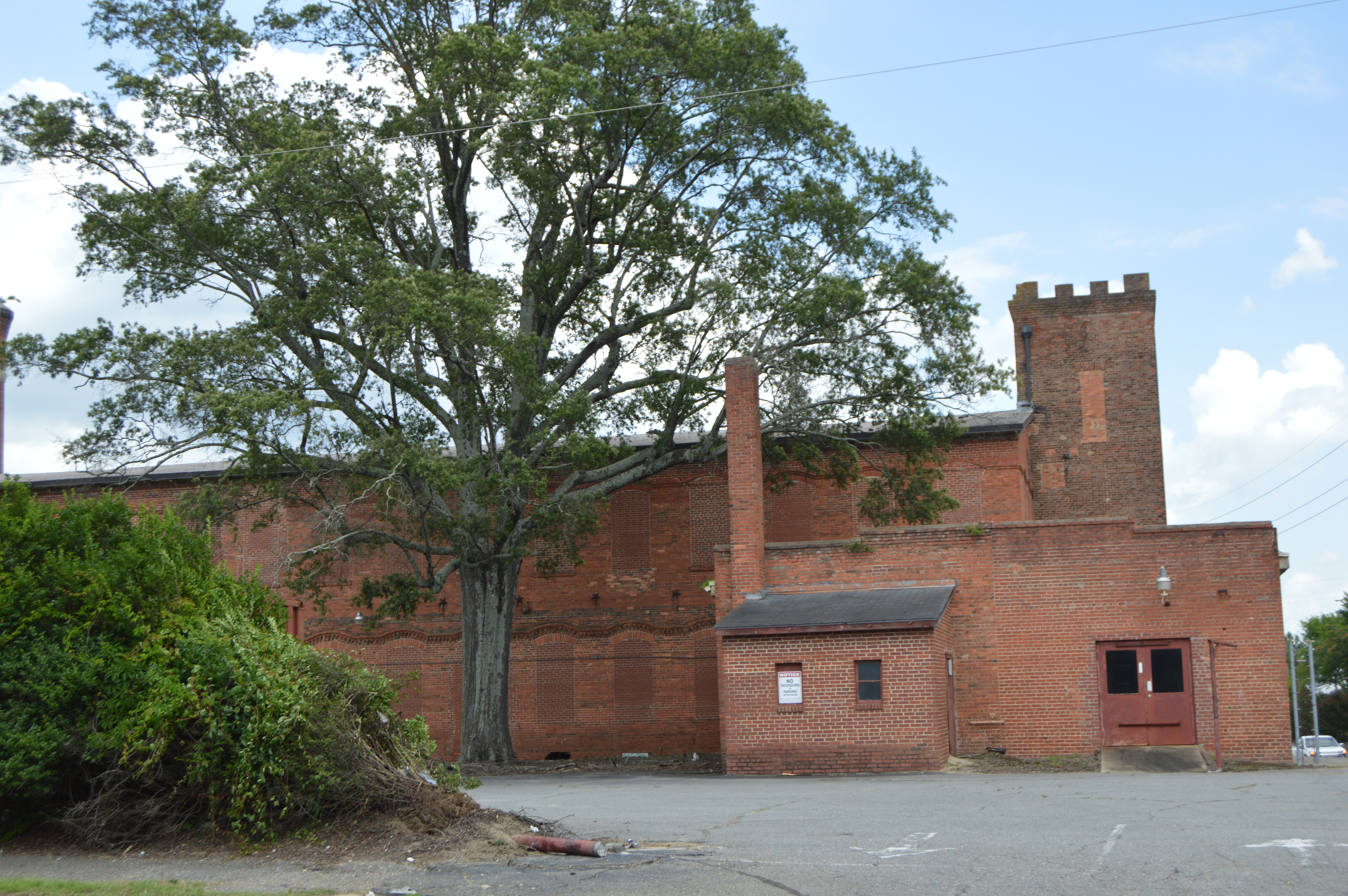
- Southern part of the complex

- Location within North Carolina Location within the United States
- Location: 800 and 801 N. William St., Goldsboro, North Carolina
- Coordinates: 35°23′34″N 77°59′21″W
- Area: 11.8 acres (4.8 ha)
- Built: 1892, 1900, 1904
- Architect: Rose, David J.,
- Architectural style: Italianate, Slow burn construction
- NRHP reference No.: 04001583
- Added to NRHP: February 2, 2005

Borden Manufacturing Company, also known as Goldsboro Cotton Mills and Wayne Cotton Mills, is a historic factory complex located at Goldsboro, Wayne County, North Carolina. The complex includes the Goldsboro Cotton Mills (1892), Goldsboro Smokestack (1905), Goldsboro Boiler Room (c. 1940), Borden-Goldsboro Pedestrian Bridge (c. 1940), Borden Manufacturing Company (1900), Borden Water Tank (c. 1930), Borden Auto Garage (c. 1915), Borden Reservoir (c. 1900), Borden Reservoir Pump House (c. 1920), Borden Railroad Siding Tracks (c. 1900), Borden Conditioning Room (c. 1915), and Borden Storage Building (c. 1920). The Goldsboro Cotton Mills is a two-story, 16 bays long, gable-front, brick building with Italianate style detailing. It features a central three-story square tower, three bays in width.

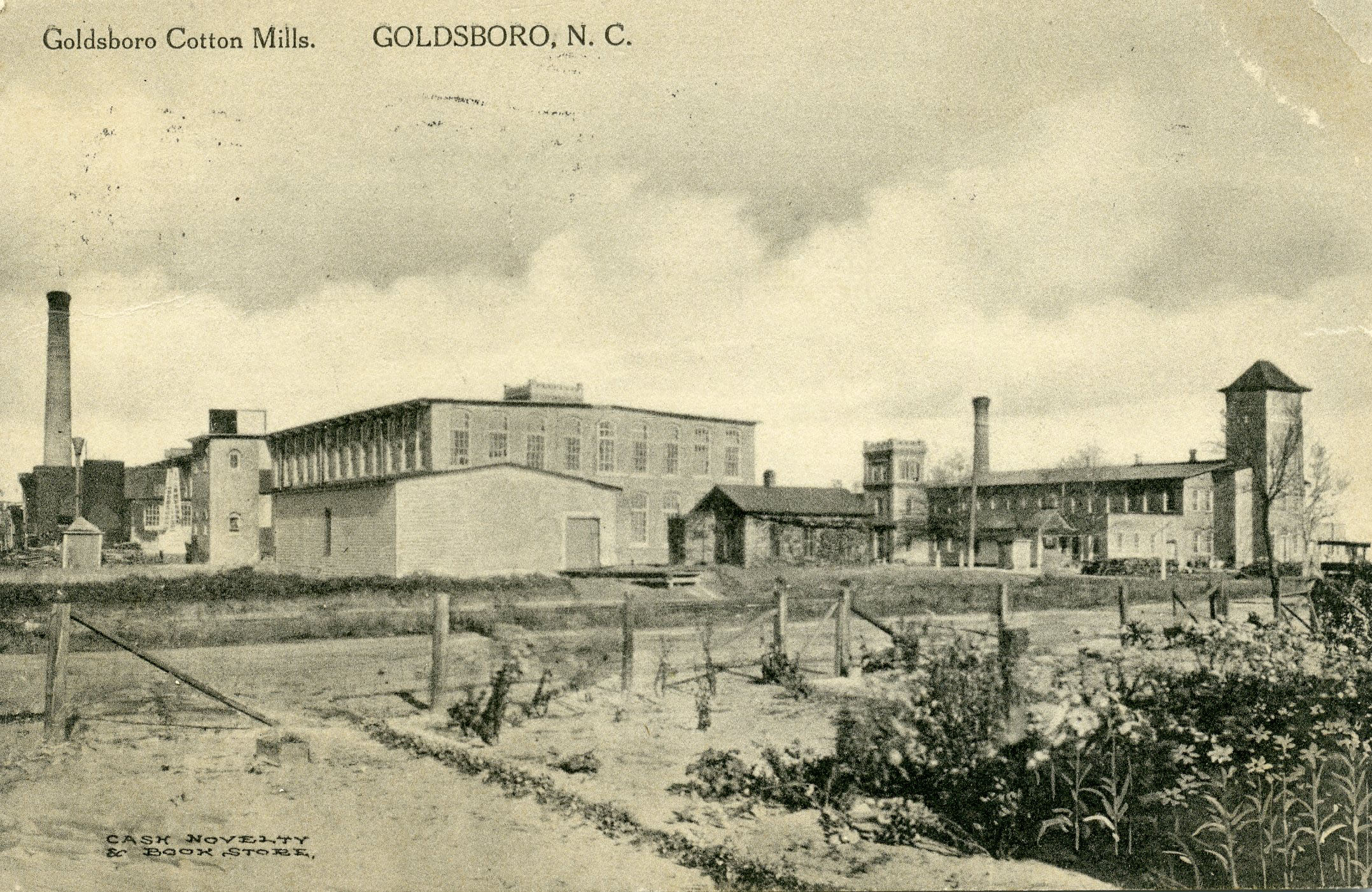
1910 postcard depicting the Goldsboro Cotton Mills

It was listed on the National Register of Historic Places in 2005.
