= United States Post Office (Mount Olive, North Carolina) =

Historic building in North Carolina, US

- US Post Office, Former
- U.S. National Register of Historic Places
- U.S. Historic district – Contributing property
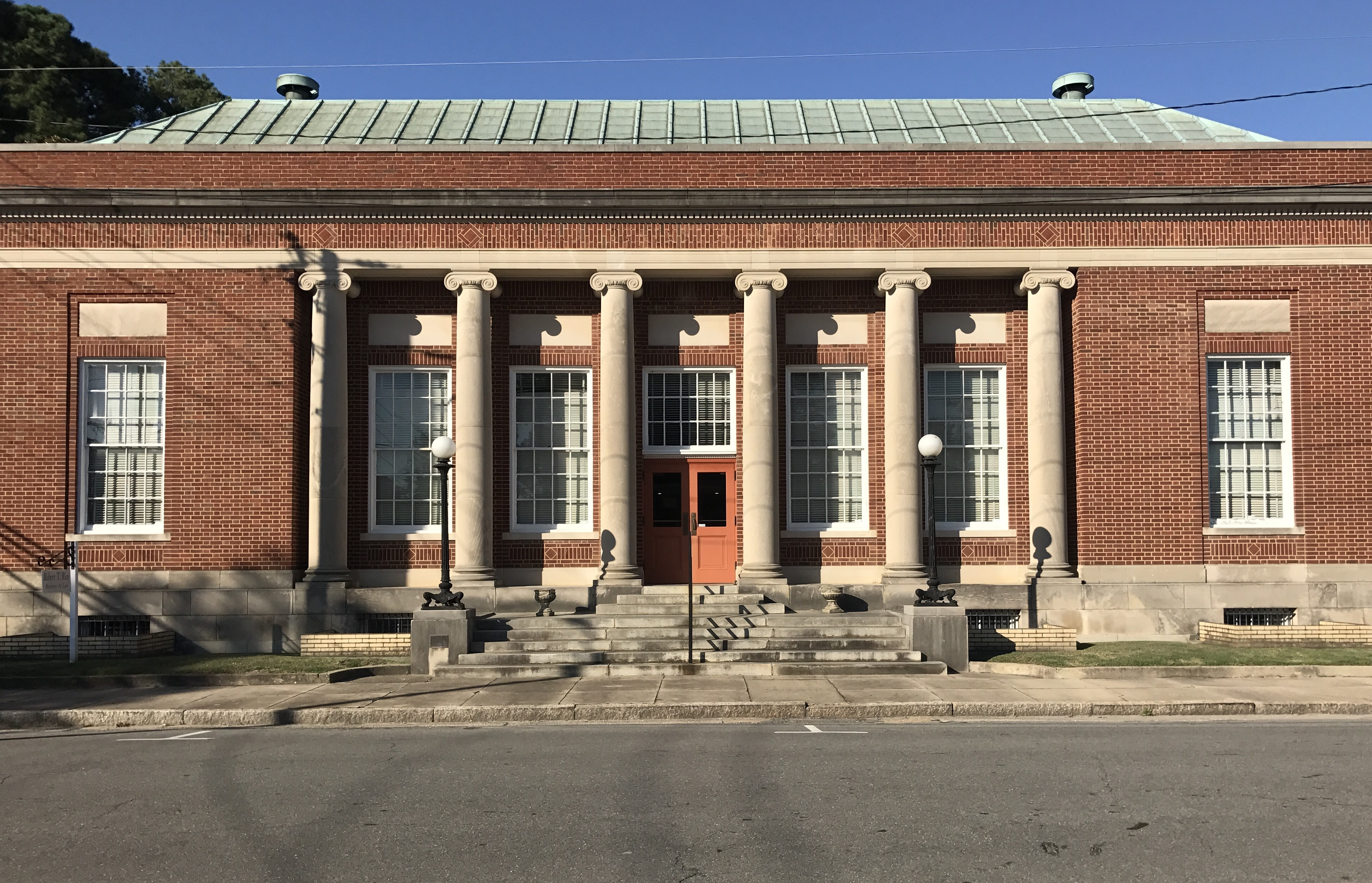

- Location within North Carolina Location within the United States
- Location: 124 W. James St., Mount Olive, North Carolina
- Coordinates: 35°11′50″N 78°4′1″W
- Area: less than one acre
- Built: 1931-1933
- Built by: General Engineering Corporation
- Architect: Office of the Supervising Architect under James A. Wetmore
- Architectural style: Classical Revival
- NRHP reference No.: 95000670
- Added to NRHP: June 2, 1995

The former United States Post Office is a historic post office building located at Mount Olive, Wayne County, North Carolina. It was designed by the Office of the Supervising Architect under James A. Wetmore and built in 1931–1933. It is a two-story, seven-bay, T-shaped, brick building in the Classical Revival style. The central five bays of the front facade features a colonnade of six unfluted Roman Ionic order columns in antis. The building has been converted to office space.

It was listed on the National Register of Historic Places in 1995. It is located in the Mount Olive Historic District.
