= Fremont, North Carolina =

- Town
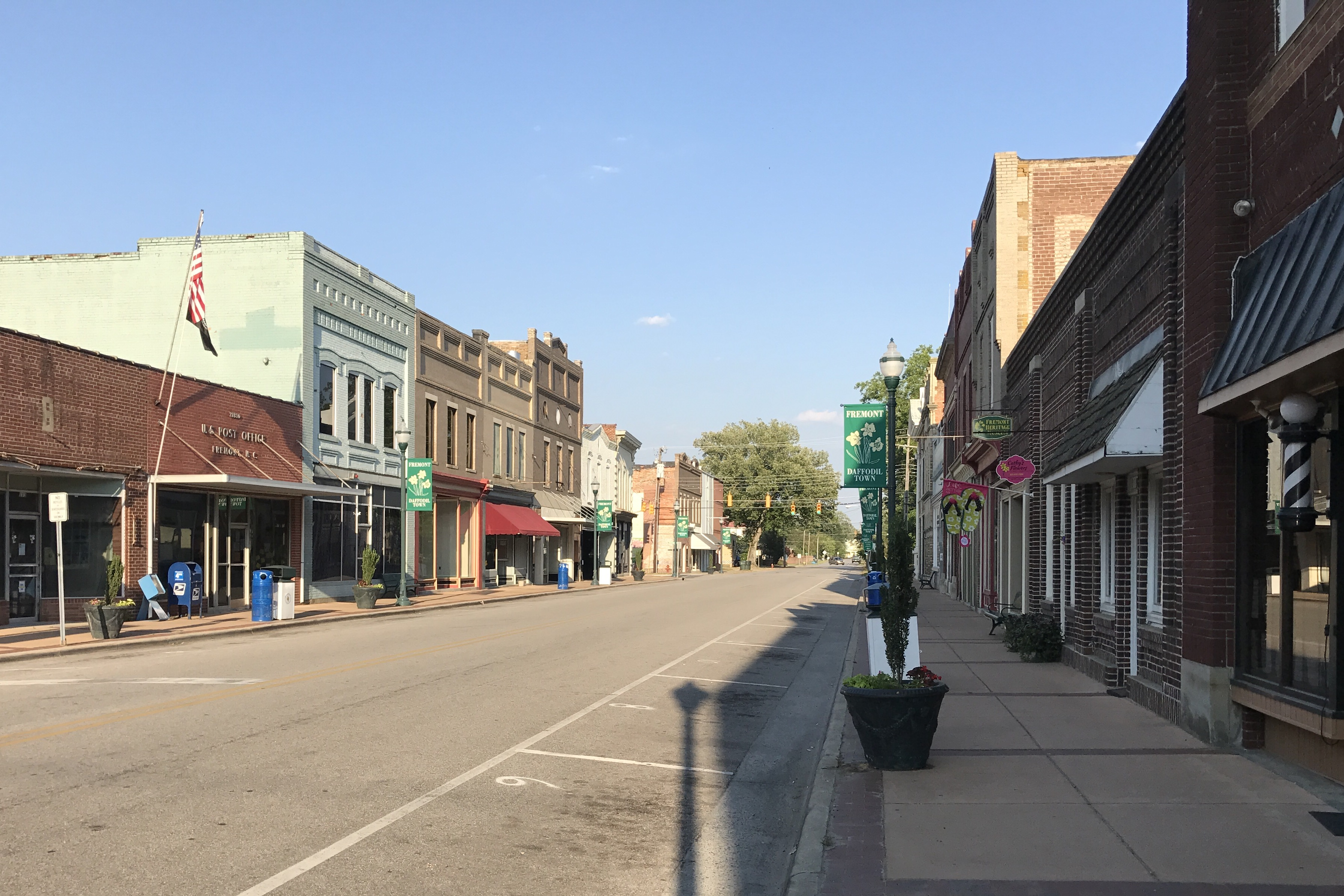

- Location within the state of North Carolina
- Coordinates: 35°32′37″N 77°58′30″W
- Country: United States
- State: North Carolina
- County: Wayne

Area
  - Total: 1.36 sq mi (3.51 km^{2})
  - Land: 1.36 sq mi (3.51 km^{2})
  - Water: 0 sq mi (0.00 km^{2})
- Elevation: 148 ft (45 m)

Population (2020)
  - Total: 1,196
  - Density: 881.9/sq mi (340.49/km^{2})
- Time zone: UTC-5 (Eastern (EST))
  - Summer (DST): UTC-4 (EDT)
- ZIP code: 27830
- Area code: 919
- FIPS code: 37-24900
- GNIS feature ID: 2406524
- Website: Town of Fremont

Fremont is a town in Wayne County, North Carolina, United States. As of the 2020 census, Fremont had a population of 1,196. It is included in the Goldsboro, North Carolina Metropolitan Statistical Area.

== History ==
Originally named Nahunta, it was renamed Fremont in 1869 after Col. Sewall Lawrence Fremont, a former U.S. Army artilleryman and chief engineer of the Wilmington and Weldon Railroad from 1854 to 1871.

The Aycock Birthplace, Barnes-Hooks Farm, and Dred and Ellen Yelverton House are listed on the National Register of Historic Places.

== Geography ==
According to the United States Census Bureau, the town has a total area of 1.4 square miles (3.6 km^{2}), all of it land.

== Demographics ==
Historical population
Census	Pop.	Note	%±
1880	246		—
1890	377		53.3%
1900	435		15.4%
1910	951		118.6%
1920	1,294		36.1%
1930	1,316		1.7%
1940	1,264		−4.0%
1950	1,395		10.4%
1960	1,609		15.3%
1970	1,596		−0.8%
1980	1,736		8.8%
1990	1,710		−1.5%
2000	1,463		−14.4%
2010	1,255		−14.2%
2020	1,196		−4.7%
U.S. Decennial Census

=== Racial and ethnic composition ===
Fremont town, North Carolina – Racial and ethnic composition Note: the US Census treats Hispanic/Latino as an ethnic category. This table excludes Latinos from the racial categories and assigns them to a separate category. Hispanics/Latinos may be of any race.
Race / Ethnicity (NH = Non-Hispanic)	Pop 2000	Pop 2010	Pop 2020	% 2000	% 2010	% 2020
White alone (NH)	667	587	534	45.59%	46.77%	44.65%
Black or African American alone (NH)	741	586	551	50.65%	46.69%	46.07%
Native American or Alaska Native alone (NH)	3	8	0	0.21%	0.64%	0.00%
Asian alone (NH)	5	3	3	0.34%	0.24%	0.25%
Native Hawaiian or Pacific Islander alone (NH)	0	0	0	0.00%	0.00%	0.00%
Other race alone (NH)	0	1	1	0.00%	0.08%	0.08%
Mixed race or Multiracial (NH)	8	26	43	0.55%	2.07%	3.60%
Hispanic or Latino (any race)	39	44	64	2.67%	3.51%	5.35%
Total	1,463	1,255	1,196	100.00%	100.00%	100.00%

=== 2020 census ===
As of the 2020 United States census, there were 1,196 people, 426 households, and 212 families residing in the town.

=== 2000 census ===
As of the census of 2000, there were 1,463 people, 591 households, and 369 families residing in the town. The population density was 1,074.6 inhabitants per square mile (414.9/km^{2}). There were 671 housing units at an average density of 492.9 per square mile (190.3/km^{2}). The racial makeup of the town was 45.86% White, 50.72% African American, 0.21% Native American, 0.34% Asian, 2.32% from other races, and 0.55% from two or more races. Hispanic or Latino of any race were 2.67% of the population.

There were 591 households, out of which 27.4% had children under the age of 18 living with them, 39.1% were married couples living together, 19.8% had a female householder with no husband present, and 37.4% were non-families. 35.0% of all households were made up of individuals, and 18.6% had someone living alone who was 65 years of age or older. The average household size was 2.39 and the average family size was 3.11.

In the town, the population was spread out, with 25.8% under the age of 18, 6.1% from 18 to 24, 24.0% from 25 to 44, 24.1% from 45 to 64, and 20.0% who were 65 years of age or older. The median age was 41 years. For every 100 females, there were 81.3 males. For every 100 females age 18 and over, there were 77.0 males.

The median income for a household in the town was $25,167, and the median income for a family was $34,375. Males had a median income of $31,250 versus $18,869 for females. The per capita income for the town was $16,892. About 15.6% of families and 21.4% of the population were below the poverty line, including 34.6% of those under age 18 and 17.7% of those age 65 or over.

== Education ==
Education in Fremont is administered by the Wayne County Public Schools system. Schools located in Fremont include Fremont STARS Elementary School, Norwayne Middle School and Charles B. Aycock High School. Higher education is offered through Wayne Community College in Goldsboro.

== Transportation ==
=== Passenger ===
- Air: Raleigh-Durham International Airport is the closest major airport with service to more than 45 domestic and international destinations. Goldsboro-Wayne Municipal Airport is an airport located nearby, but is only used for general aviation.
- Fremont is not served directly by passenger trains. The closest Amtrak station is located in Wilson.
- Bus: The area is served by Greyhound with a location in nearby Goldsboro.

=== Roads ===
- The main highways in Fremont are US 117 and NC 222.
- I-795 is the closest Interstate Highway on the outskirts of Fremont intersecting with NC 222, while Interstate 95 is located 15 miles west in Kenly.
