= Harry Fitzhugh Lee House =

Historic house in North Carolina, United States

- U.S. National Register of Historic Places
- Location within North Carolina Location within the United States
- Location: 310 W. Walnut St., Goldsboro, North Carolina
- Coordinates: 35°23′3″N 78°0′11″W
- Area: less than one acre
- Built: 1922
- Architect: John David Gullett
- Architectural style: Colonial Revival
- NRHP reference No.: 84002542
- Added to NRHP: March 1, 1984

Harry Fitzhugh Lee House is a historic home located at Goldsboro, Wayne County, North Carolina. It was built in 1922, and is a two-story, five-bay, Colonial Revival-style brick dwelling with a gambrel roof and frame shed-roof dormers. A 1 1/2-story gambrel roofed addition was built in 1939. It features a covered porch supported by paired Doric order pillars. It was the home of Harry Fitzhugh Lee, a prominent Goldsboro businessman and a great-nephew of General Robert E. Lee.

It was designed by local architect John David Gullett.

The building was listed on the U.S. National Register of Historic Places in 1984.
