= Goldsboro, North Carolina =

- City
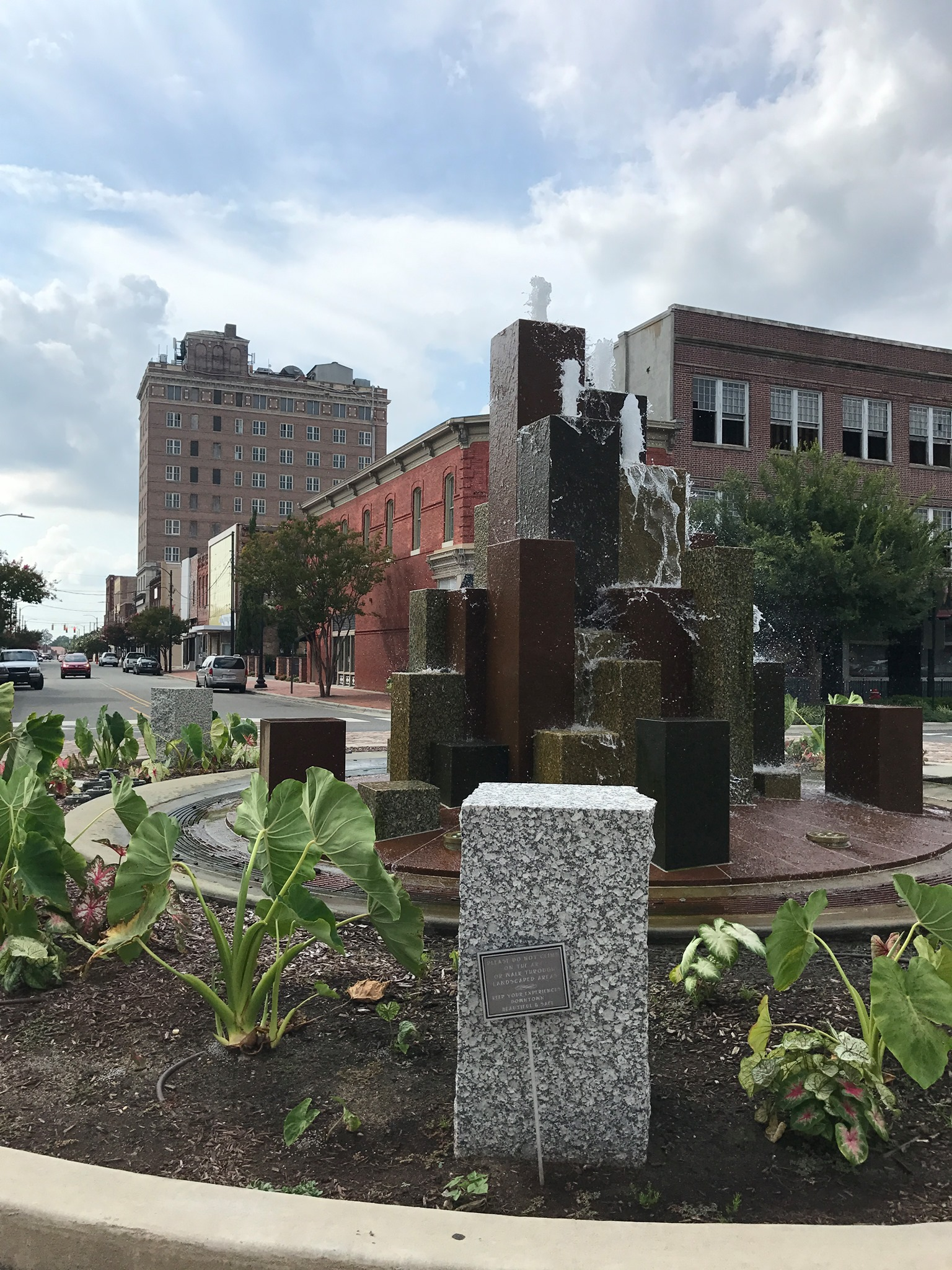
- A Center Street traffic circle in Goldsboro

- Flag Seal
- Motto(s): "Be More, Do More, Seymour"
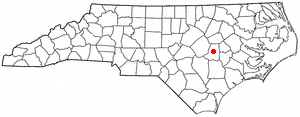
- Location of Goldsboro in North Carolina

- Location within North Carolina Location within the United States
- Coordinates: 35°23′2″N 77°59′42″W
- Country: United States
- State: North Carolina
- County: Wayne
- Founded / Incorporated: 1787 / 1847

Government
  - Mayor: Charles Gaylor

Area
  - City: 28.75 sq mi (74.45 km^{2})
  - Land: 28.59 sq mi (74.05 km^{2})
  - Water: 0.15 sq mi (0.40 km^{2})
- Elevation: 108 ft (33 m)

Population (2020)
  - City: 33,657
  - Density: 1,177.2/sq mi (454.52/km^{2})
  - Urban: 54,456 (US: 478th)
  - Urban density: 1,024/sq mi (395.5/km^{2})
  - Metro: 117,333 (US: 334th)
- Time zone: UTC−5 (EST)
  - Summer (DST): UTC−4 (EDT)
- ZIP codes: 27530-27534
- Area codes: 919, 984
- FIPS code: 37-26880
- Website: goldsboronc.gov

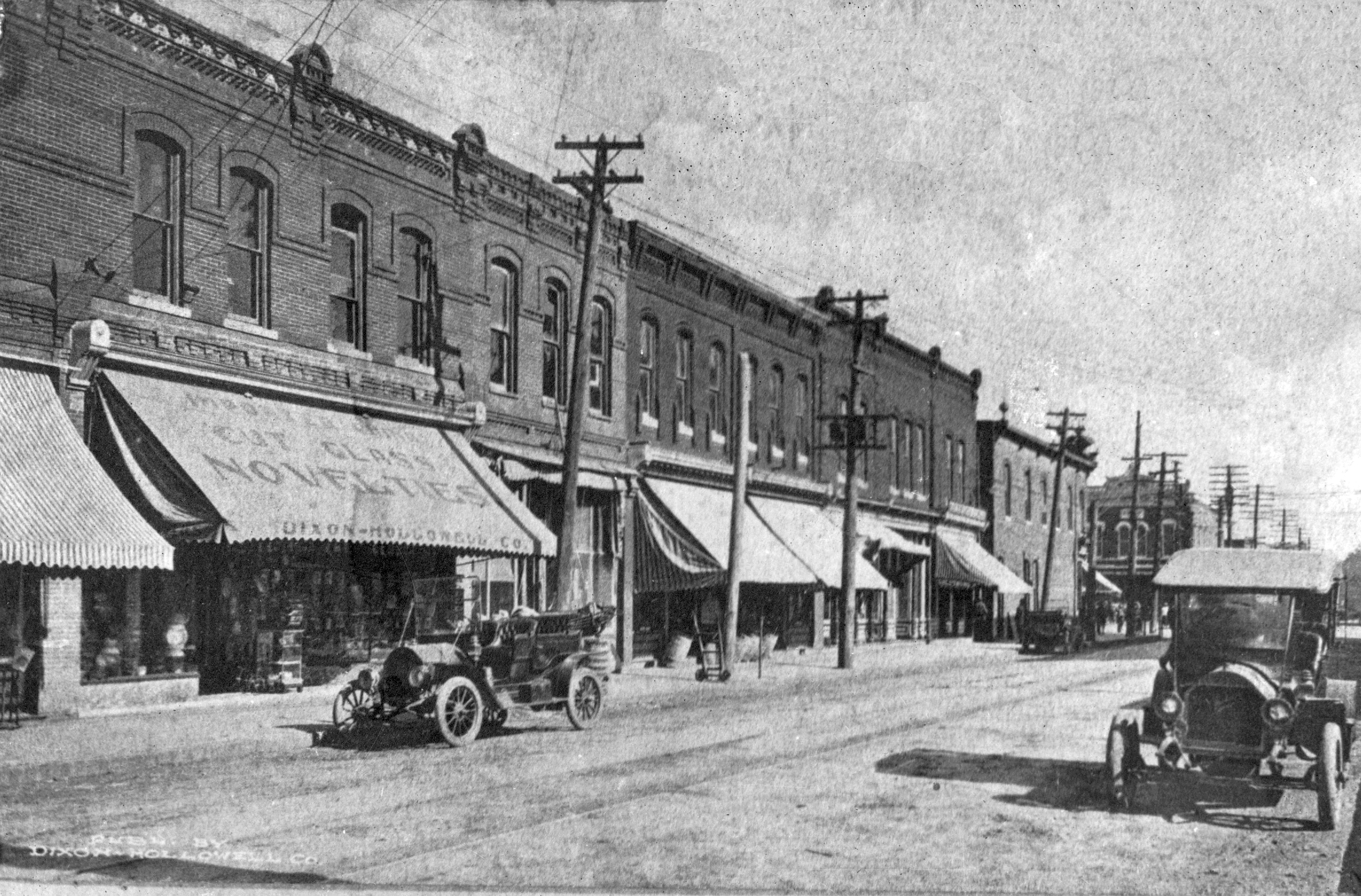
West Walnut Street, circa 1915

Goldsboro, originally Goldsborough, is a city in and the county seat of Wayne County, North Carolina, United States. The population was 33,657 at the 2020 census. It is the principal city of the Goldsboro, North Carolina Metropolitan Statistical Area. The nearby town of Waynesboro was founded in 1787, and Goldsboro was incorporated in 1847.

The city is situated in North Carolina's Coastal Plain and is bordered on the south by the Neuse River and the west by the Little River, approximately 40 miles (64 km) southwest of Greenville, 50 miles (80 km) southeast of Raleigh, the state capital, and 75 miles (121 km) north of Wilmington in Southeastern North Carolina. Seymour Johnson Air Force Base is located in Goldsboro.

== History ==
Around 1787, when Wayne County was formed, a town named Waynesborough grew around the county's courthouse. In 1787, William Whitfield III (son of William Whitfield II) and his son were appointed "Directors and Trustees" for designing and building the town. Located on the east bank of the Neuse River, the town became the county seat. Population growth in Waynesborough continued through the 1830s. However, that changed once the Wilmington and Weldon Railroad was completed in the early 1840s. By then, a hotel had been built at the intersection of the railroad and New Bern Road, which grew into a community after the train started to transport passengers from there.

More and more citizens soon moved from Waynesborough to the growing village, named eventually "Goldsborough's Junction" after Major Matthew T. Goldsborough, an Assistant Chief Engineer with the railroad line. Later it was shortened simply to Goldsborough. In 1847, the town was incorporated and became the new Wayne County seat following a vote of the citizens of Wayne County. Local legend has it the Goldsborough supporters put moonshine in the town's well to encourage people to vote for Goldsborough.

Goldsborough's growth continued in part by new railroad connections to Charlotte and Beaufort. By 1861, the town's population was estimated to be 1,500. It was the trading center of a rural area that started with yeoman farmers. By this time, it had been developed as large cotton plantations dependent on the labor of enslaved African Americans, as the invention of the cotton gin had enabled profitable cultivation of short-staple cotton in the up-counties.

Because of its importance as a railroad junction, Goldsborough played a significant role in the Civil War, both for stationing Confederate troops and for transporting their supplies. The town also provided hospitals for soldiers wounded in nearby battles. In December 1862, the Battle of Goldsborough Bridge was waged, in which both sides fought for possession of the strategically significant Wilmington and Weldon Railroad Bridge. Union General John Foster arrived with his troops on December 17, aiming to destroy this bridge in order to put an end to the vital supply chain from the port of Wilmington. He succeeded on that same day, his troops overpowering the small number of defending Confederate soldiers and burning down the bridge. On their way back to New Bern, Foster's men were attacked again by Confederate troops, but they survived with fewer casualties than the enemy. The important bridge at Goldsborough was rebuilt in a matter of weeks.

Goldsborough was the scene of another Union offensive in 1865, during Union General Sherman's Carolinas campaign. After the battles of Bentonville and Wyse Fork, Sherman's forces met with the armies of Schofield, their troops taking over the city in March. During the following three weeks, Goldsborough was occupied by over 100,000 Union soldiers. After the war was over, some of these troops continued to stay in the city.

In 1869, the spelling of the city was officially changed to Goldsboro. Wayne County was part of North Carolina's 2nd congressional district following the Civil War, when it was known as the "Black Second", for its majority-black population. This district elected four Republican African Americans to Congress in the 19th century, three of them after the Reconstruction era. The attorney George Henry White was the last to serve, being elected in 1894 and serving two terms.

The Democrat-dominated legislature established legal racial segregation in public facilities. To further this, in the 1880s it authorized a facility to serve the black mentally ill, the State Hospital in Goldsboro. In 1899 the legislature authorized an addition but did not appropriate sufficient funds. This operated until after passage of civil rights legislation requiring integration of public facilities. In addition, the hospital was affected by the 1970s movement to de-institutionalize care for the mentally ill. Most states have failed to adequately support community programs to replace such facilities.

During World War II the North Carolina congressional delegation was successful in gaining the present-day Seymour Johnson Air Force Base, which opened on the outskirts of Goldsboro in April 1942 as a US Army Air Forces installation named Seymour Johnson Field. From this point on, the city's population and businesses increased as a result of the federal defense installation. The base's name was changed to Seymour Johnson AFB in 1947 following the establishment of the US Air Force as an independent service. The city is home to Goldsboro Milling Company, the 10th largest producer of hogs in the U.S., and also a major producer of turkeys. The Borden Manufacturing Company, First Presbyterian Church, L. D. Giddens and Son Jewelry Store, Goldsboro Union Station, Harry Fitzhugh Lee House, Odd Fellows Lodge, and Solomon and Henry Weil Houses are listed on the National Register of Historic Places.

=== Nuclear accident ===
In 1961, two 3.8 megaton hydrogen bombs were dropped accidentally on the village of Faro, 12 miles (19 km) north of Goldsboro, after a B-52 aircraft broke up in mid air. The two Mark 39 nuclear bombs were released after the crew abandoned a B-52 bomber which had suffered mid-flight structural failure. Both bombs went through several steps in the arming sequence, but neither detonated. A bomb was recovered. Although much of the second bomb was also recovered, a missing piece containing uranium was believed to have sunk deep into the swampy earth and could not be recovered. The piece remains in land that the Air Force eventually purchased in order to prevent any land use or digging. It was revealed in 2013 that three safety mechanisms on one bomb had failed, leaving just one low-voltage switch preventing detonation.

== Geography ==
According to the United States Census Bureau, the city has a total area of 24.8 square miles (64 km^{2}), of which 24.8 square miles (64 km^{2}) is land and 0.04 square miles (0.10 km^{2}) (0.08%) is water. The Neuse River defines the southern boundary of the city. Little River is a class WS-III river which provides the water source for Goldsboro. It runs through the west of the city, and joins the Neuse River about 2 miles (3.2 km) south of US 70. Stoney Creek runs through the east of the city between downtown and Seymour Johnson Air Force Base. As of 1982 the Goldsboro waste-water treatment plant accounted for 59% of total effluent discharged into the Neuse between Clayton and Kinston.

The closest lakes to the city center are McArthur Lake, 3.3 miles (5.3 km) to the southwest, Cedar Lake, 4.6 miles (7.4 km) to the north and Quaker Neck Lake, 4.7 miles (7.6 km) to the west. Quaker Neck Lake is an artificial lake which supplies cooling water to the H.F. Lee Energy Complex. The closest reservoirs are Cogdells Pond, 2.6 miles (4.2 km) to the northeast and Wills Pond, 5.4 miles (8.7 km) to the west. Wills Pond is also known as Bear Creek W/S Lake Number Four. Wills Pond impounds Old Mill Branch, a tributary of Bear Creek that flows east and enters Bear Creek near its headwaters.

=== Climate ===
Goldsboro's location on the Atlantic Coastal Plain gives it a humid subtropical climate, with hot humid summers and cool winters. The hottest month is July, with an average high temperature of 91 °F (31 °C), and an average low of 71 °F (22 °C). The coldest month is January, with an average high of 54 °F (11 °C), and an average low of 34 °F (0 °C). The annual total rainfall is 52.53 inches (1,334 mm), falling relatively evenly with a slight wet season in the late summer/early fall. Some light to moderate snowfall can take place in winter, but amounts can fluctuate greatly and can range from no snow to totals over one foot (30 cm) in some years.

Climate data for GOLDSBORO 4 SE, NC, 1991-2020 normals
Month	Jan	Feb	Mar	Apr	May	Jun	Jul	Aug	Sep	Oct	Nov	Dec	Year
Mean daily maximum °F (°C)	54.2 (12.3)	58.1 (14.5)	65.1 (18.4)	75.2 (24.0)	81.8 (27.7)	88.0 (31.1)	91.0 (32.8)	89.1 (31.7)	83.4 (28.6)	74.8 (23.8)	65.5 (18.6)	57.3 (14.1)	73.6 (23.1)
Daily mean °F (°C)	44.4 (6.9)	47.3 (8.5)	54.1 (12.3)	63.1 (17.3)	70.6 (21.4)	78.4 (25.8)	81.3 (27.4)	80.0 (26.7)	74.8 (23.8)	64.3 (17.9)	54.4 (12.4)	47.3 (8.5)	63.3 (17.4)
Mean daily minimum °F (°C)	34.6 (1.4)	36.4 (2.4)	43.1 (6.2)	51.0 (10.6)	59.5 (15.3)	68.8 (20.4)	71.7 (22.1)	70.8 (21.6)	66.3 (19.1)	53.9 (12.2)	43.3 (6.3)	37.3 (2.9)	53.1 (11.7)
Average precipitation inches (mm)	3.55 (90)	3.24 (82)	4.22 (107)	3.90 (99)	3.52 (89)	4.40 (112)	5.42 (138)	6.42 (163)	7.03 (179)	3.79 (96)	3.17 (81)	3.60 (91)	52.26 (1,327)
Average snowfall inches (cm)	1.3 (3.3)	0.0 (0.0)	0.0 (0.0)	0.0 (0.0)	0.0 (0.0)	0.0 (0.0)	0.0 (0.0)	0.0 (0.0)	0.0 (0.0)	0.0 (0.0)	0.0 (0.0)	0.7 (1.8)	2.0 (5.1)
Average precipitation days (≥ 0.01 in)	11.9	9.5	11.3	8.7	9.5	10.3	12.8	10.8	10.1	7.4	8.2	10.4	120.9
Average snowy days (≥ 0.1 in)	0.7	0.1	0.0	0.0	0.0	0.0	0.0	0.0	0.0	0.0	0.0	0.2	1.0
Source: NOAA

== Demographics ==
Historical population
Census	Pop.	Note	%±
1860	885		—
1870	1,134		28.1%
1880	3,286		189.8%
1890	4,017		22.2%
1900	5,877		46.3%
1910	6,107		3.9%
1920	11,296		85.0%
1930	14,985		32.7%
1940	17,274		15.3%
1950	21,454		24.2%
1960	28,873		34.6%
1970	26,960		−6.6%
1980	31,871		18.2%
1990	40,709		27.7%
2000	39,043		−4.1%
2010	36,437		−6.7%
2020	33,657		−7.6%
U.S. Decennial Census

=== Racial and ethnic composition ===
Goldsboro city, North Carolina – Racial and ethnic composition Note: the US Census treats Hispanic/Latino as an ethnic category. This table excludes Latinos from the racial categories and assigns them to a separate category. Hispanics/Latinos may be of any race.
Race / Ethnicity (NH = Non-Hispanic)	Pop 2000	Pop 2010	Pop 2020	% 2000	% 2010	% 2020
White alone (NH)	16,346	13,628	10,931	41.87%	37.40%	32.48%
Black or African American alone (NH)	20,295	19,593	17,867	51.98%	53.77%	53.09%
Native American or Alaska Native alone (NH)	159	112	103	0.41%	0.31%	0.31%
Asian alone (NH)	556	646	781	1.42%	1.77%	2.32%
Native Hawaiian or Pacific Islander alone (NH)	18	18	29	0.05%	0.05%	0.09%
Other race alone (NH)	64	42	135	0.16%	0.12%	0.40%
Mixed race or Multiracial (NH)	553	815	1,428	1.42%	2.24%	4.24%
Hispanic or Latino (any race)	1,052	1,583	2,383	2.69%	4.34%	7.08%
Total	39,043	36,437	33,657	100.00%	100.00%	100.00%

=== 2020 census ===
As of the 2020 census, Goldsboro had a population of 33,657. The median age was 38.1 years; 21.8% of residents were under the age of 18 and 19.5% were 65 years of age or older. For every 100 females there were 89.7 males, and for every 100 females age 18 and over there were 87.6 males age 18 and over.

Of the residents, 98.6% lived in urban areas, while 1.4% lived in rural areas. There were 13,832 households and 8,320 families in Goldsboro; 28.1% of households had children under the age of 18 living in them. Of all households, 30.4% were married-couple households, 21.3% were households with a male householder and no spouse or partner present, and 43.3% were households with a female householder and no spouse or partner present. About 37.9% of all households were made up of individuals and 16.8% had someone living alone who was 65 years of age or older. There were 16,213 housing units, of which 14.7% were vacant. The homeowner vacancy rate was 1.5% and the rental vacancy rate was 4.7%.

Racial composition as of the 2020 census
Race	Number	Percent
White	11,512	34.2%
Black or African American	18,104	53.8%
American Indian and Alaska Native	156	0.5%
Asian	796	2.4%
Native Hawaiian and Other Pacific Islander	30	0.1%
Some other race	995	3.0%
Two or more races	2,064	6.1%

=== Income ===
The median income for a household in the city was $33,043, and the median income for a family was $59,844. Males had a median income of $55,223 versus $56,850 for females. The per capita income for the city was $21,666. About 26.2% of the population were below the poverty line.

== Arts and culture ==
=== Sites of interest ===
- Cliffs of the Neuse State Park is a state park located near the city. It covers 751 acres (3.04 km^{2}) along the southern banks of the Neuse River. It has a swimming area, several hiking trails, fishing areas, a nature museum, and picnic areas. The cliffs rise 90 feet above the Neuse River.
- Waynesborough Historical Village is a reconstructed "village" located near the original site of the town of Waynesborough. It is home to historical Wayne County buildings ranging from various periods of time. These buildings include a family home, a medical office, a one-room school, a law office, and a Quaker Meeting House.
- Herman Park includes a recreational center, miniature train, tennis courts, picnic shelters, a turn-of-the-century park house, gazebo, goldfish pond, fountain, and children's playground.
- The Oheb Shalom synagogue's Romanesque Revival building is one of fewer than a hundred nineteenth-century synagogues still standing in the United States, and the second oldest synagogue building in the state.

== Government ==
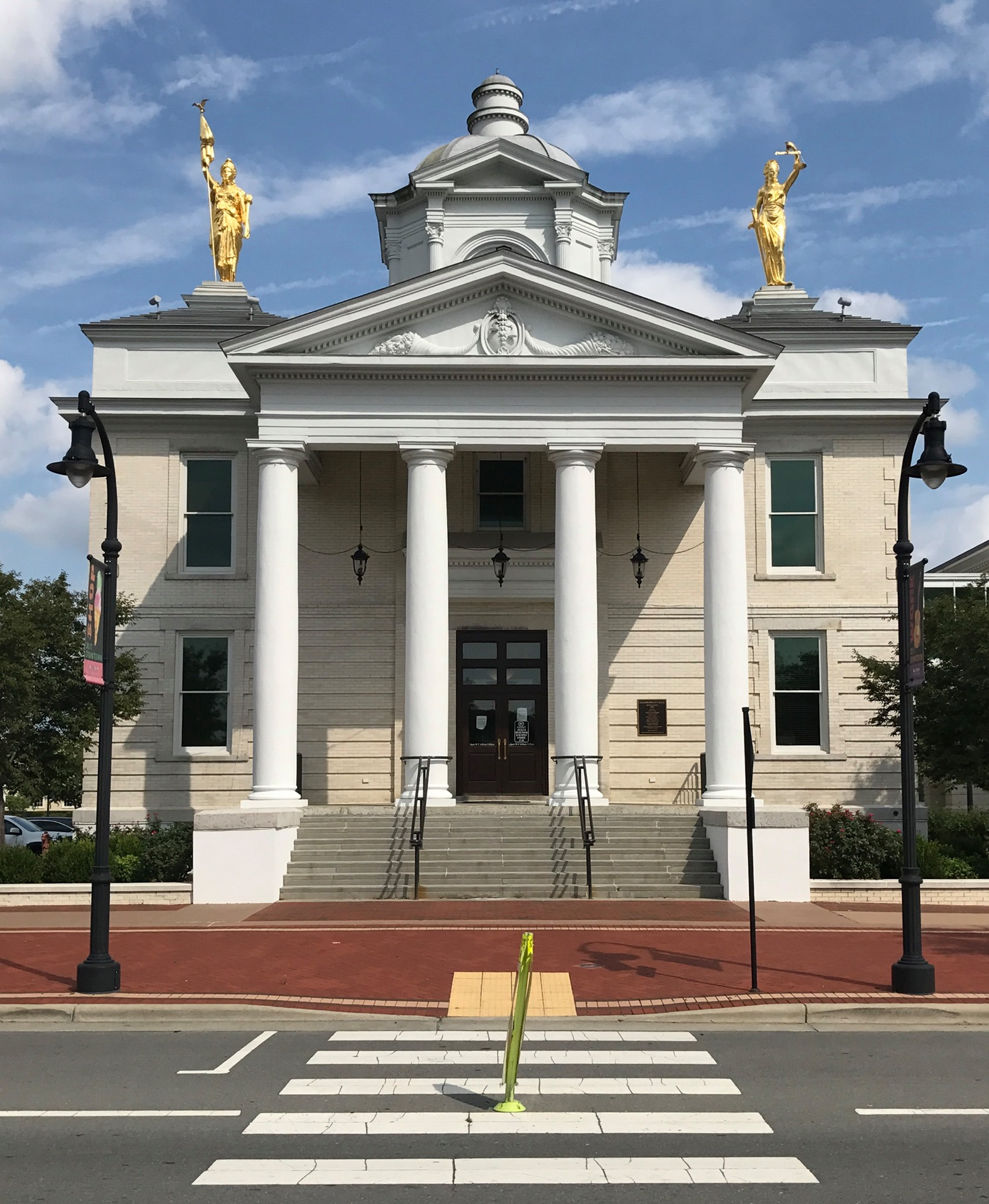
Goldsboro City Hall

Chuck Allen served as the city's Mayor, succeeding Alfonzo "Al" King in 2016 who succeeded Hal Plonk in 2002. As mayor, Allen was the official and ceremonial head of city government and presides at all City Council meetings. The mayor and the city council are elected to office for a four-year term. Goldsboro has a council-manager government. As of 2020, the city manager is Matthew Livingston.

In June 2021, Allen abruptly resigned citing health issues. As of 2022, the city's mayor is Charles Gaylor.

=== City council ===
- 1st District: Hiawatha Jones
- 2nd District: Chris Boyette
- 3rd District: Jamie Taylor
- 4th District: Brandi Matthews
- 5th District: Beverly Weeks
- 6th District: Roderick White

=== Federal representatives ===
Goldsboro has been in North Carolina's 7th congressional district since January 3, 2017, and is currently represented by Republican David Rouzer. Beginning on January 3, 2021, Goldsboro was placed in North Carolina's 1st congressional district and was represented by Democrat G. K. Butterfield. Goldsboro is represented in the Senate by Republicans Ted Budd and Thom Tillis.

== Education ==
=== Colleges ===
- North Carolina Wesleyan College Goldsboro campus
- Wayne Community College

=== High schools ===
- Eastern Wayne High School
- Goldsboro High School
- Rosewood High School
- Wayne Early/Middle College High School
- Wayne School of Engineering
- Charles B. Aycock High School
- Spring Creek High School
- Southern Wayne High School
- Wayne School of Technical Arts

=== Middle schools ===
- Dillard Middle School
- Eastern Wayne Middle School
- Greenwood Middle School
- Rosewood Middle School
- Brogden Middle School
- Norwayne Middle School
- Spring Creek Middle School

=== Elementary schools ===
- Carver Heights Elementary School
- Dillard Academy Charter School
- Eastern Wayne Elementary School
- Grantham Elementary School
- Meadow Lane Elementary School
- North Drive Elementary School
- Rosewood Elementary School
- School Street Early Learning Center
- Spring Creek Elementary School
- Tommy's Road Elementary School

• Northwest Elementary School, • Northeast Elementary School

=== Private schools ===
- Faith Christian Academy
- Pathway Christian Academy
- St. Mary Catholic School
- Wayne Christian School
- Wayne Country Day School
- Wayne Preparatory Academy

== Media ==
=== Newspaper ===
The Goldsboro News-Argus is a paid subscription to Goldsboro's daily newspaper with a circulation of approximately 16,500. Goldsboro Daily News is a free online daily newspaper.

=== Television ===
Goldsboro supports one television station. WHFL TV 43 is a low-power broadcast station on UHF channel 43 and is also found on two local cable networks. The station is a FamilyNet affiliate and carries religious, local, and family programming. The area is also served by television stations from the Raleigh-Durham and Greenville areas. CBS affiliate WNCN-TV, Channel 17, is licensed to Goldsboro but has its studios in Raleigh. Up until August 2010, a Public, educational, and government access (PEG) cable TV station called PACC-10 TV was available to Time Warner Cable customers. The station aired its own programming as well as City Council and County Commissioner meetings. Time Warner Cable transferred the channel to Wayne County which currently provides local announcements and community interest programming.

=== Radio stations based in Goldsboro ===
- WZKT 97.7 FM Country
- WFMC 730 AM Spanish CHR (formally Black Gospel; changed in 2025)
- WGBR 1150 AM/98.3 FM (Translator) Classic Hits
- WSSG 1300 AM/92.7 FM JAMZ Urban

== Infrastructure ==
=== Transportation ===
The closest civilian airport is Wayne Executive Jetport, but is only used for general aviation. The nearest public commercial airport is Pitt-Greenville Airport (IATA: PGV) in Greenville about 36 miles northeast of Goldsboro. However, most residents use Raleigh-Durham International Airport for domestic and international travel. Major highways which run through the city are US 70 (the main thoroughfare through Goldsboro), US 13, US 117, NC 111, and NC 581. I-795 now connects Goldsboro to I-95 in Wilson.

The Goldsboro Bypass which was formerly a route of U.S. 70 was fully opened in May 2016. Previously NC 44 while partially open and under construction, it became US 70 Byp. upon completion and has now been designated as I-42. The city has a bus system known as Gateway which runs four routes. Until the 1960s, the Southern Railway and the Seaboard Coast Line ran passenger trains in and out of Goldsboro Union Station to points west, north and south.

=== Hospitals ===
- Wayne Memorial Hospital (North Carolina), a medical facility located in Goldsboro, is the county's second-largest employer.
- Cherry Hospital is a psychiatric hospital which first started in 1880 as a facility to treat mentally ill African Americans. A museum depicting its history is also part of the hospital campus.
- O'Berry Neuro-Medical Center is a North Carolina Department of Health and Human Services hospital providing rehabilitative services to people with intellectual disabilities/ developmental disabilities.

== Notable people ==
- George Altman, Major League Baseball player for Chicago Cubs
- Christopher R. Barron, member of board of directors and co-founder of GOProud
- Curtis Hooks Brogden, 19th-century politician
- Dan Bullock, private first class, U.S. Marine. Vietnam War
- Doris Coley, singer and member of the Shirelles
- Annie Dove Denmark, educator
- Jimmy Graham, National Football League player for New Orleans Saints and Seattle Seahawks
- Johnny Grant, radio personality, television producer and honorary mayor of Hollywood, Los Angeles
- Andy Griffith, actor, lived in Goldsboro and taught English, drama, and music at Goldsboro High School
- John W. Gulick, major general in the U.S. Army
- Anne Jeffreys, actress, born Annie Jeffreys Carmichael on January 26, 1923 in Goldsboro
- John H. Kerr, III, state senator
- Joshua Kindred, U.S. federal judge in Alaska
- Clyde King, MLB pitcher and manager of the Atlanta Braves and New York Yankees
- Jerry Narron, MLB player, coach, and manager of the Texas Rangers and Cincinnati Reds
- Mark O'Meara, golfer who won the 1998 Masters and 1998 British Open
- Jarran Reed, NFL player
- Kenneth Claiborne Royall, U.S. Army general and Secretary of War
- Dave Simmons, NFL football player
- David Thornton, football player for the Tennessee Titans and Indianapolis Colts
- Big Daddy V, (real name Nelson Frazier Jr.), WWE wrestler
- Greg Warren, NFL player for Pittsburgh Steelers
- Joby Warrick, winner of two Pulitzer Prizes
- Thomas Washington, an admiral in the U.S. Navy during World War I
- William Henry Washington, 19th-century politician
- Coby White, National Basketball Association player for the Charlotte Hornets
