= Fork Township, Wayne County, North Carolina =

Township in Wayne County, North Carolina

Fork Township
- Township
- Location in North Carolina Location in the United States
- Coordinates: 35.4015°N 78.0994°W
- Country: United States
- State: North Carolina
- County: Wayne

Area
  - Total: 46.4 sq mi (120 km^{2})

Population (2019)
  - Total: 10,928
  - Density: 236/sq mi (90.9/km^{2})
- Postal codes: 27530, 27569

Fork Township is a township in the Goldsboro metropolitan area in western Wayne County, North Carolina and has a population of 10,928 as of the 2019 American Community Survey.

== History ==
Fork Township, originally called Fork River, was named for its location at the fork of the Neuse River and Little River. It first began appearing in records in 1838.

== Geography ==
According to the United States Census Bureau, the township has a total land area of (46.4 sq mi) or approximately 29,696 acres (120.18 km^{2}). Fork is bordered in the west by Boon Hill Township, in the southwest tip by Grantham, in the south by Brogden, in the east by Goldsboro, in the northeast by Stoney Creek Township and Rosewood, and in the north by Buck Swamp.

== Politics ==
Fork is represented by North Carolina's 7th congressional district, the 5th and 7th Senate districts, and the 4th, 10th, and 21st House districts. As of 2021–2022, the township is represented by Senators Richard Burr, Jim Perry, and Thom Tillis and Representatives David Rouzer, Raymond Smith Jr., and John R. Bell IV. Locally, they fall under the jurisdiction of Goldsboro's mayor. Mayor Chuck Allen resigned abruptly in June 2021 citing health issues.

== Population ==
The 2019 American Community Survey estimated that 81.3% of the Fork Township population identified as white; 14.9% as Black; 2.5% as two or more races; 0.7% as Native; 0.4% as Asian; and 0.1% as Native Hawaiian/Pacific Islander. 12 of the 81 Native residents identified themselves as Cherokee.

The majority of the population were adults between ages 18 and 65, with a median age of 37.7; 5,919 were male and 5,009 were female. 46.7% of the population was married, 31.6% were unmarried, 15.2% were divorced or separated, and 6.6% were widowed. The township was made up of 3,825 households and more than two-thirds of residents owned their residence. 1,234 veterans lived in the town in 2019; 433 were in the Iraq War, 395 were in the Gulf War, 399 were in Vietnam, and 74 were in Korea. The median earnings for male residents was $42,731 and for female residents was $37,675. Almost 34.5% held an Associate's degree or higher.

Historical population

Year	Pop.	±%
1890	1,603	—
1900	2,283	+42.4%
1910	2,778	+21.7%
1920	3,525	+26.9%
1930	4,321	+22.6%
1940	5,648	+30.7%
1950	5,104	−9.6%

Year	Pop.	±%
1960	6,563	+28.6%
1970	6,578	+0.2%
1980	6,795	+3.3%
1990	7,690	+13.2%
2000	9,805	+27.5%
2010	11,234	+14.6%
2019	10,928	−2.7%

== Education ==
Fork is part of Wayne County Public Schools and is zoned for Rosewood Elementary School, Rosewood Middle School, and Rosewood High School. Other area public schools include Wayne School of Engineering, Wayne Early/Middle College High School (dual enrollment with Wayne County Community College), and Goldsboro High Restart. Nearby private schools include Wayne Christian School, Wayne Country Day School, The Children's House, Goldsboro KinderCare, New Independence Academy, St. Mary School, Summit Christian Academy, Pathway Christian Academy, Faith Christian Academy, and Wayne Montessori School.
