= Buck Swamp Township, Wayne County, North Carolina =

Township in Wayne County, North Carolina, U.S.

Coordinates: 35.483°N 78.054°W

Buck Swamp Township
- Township
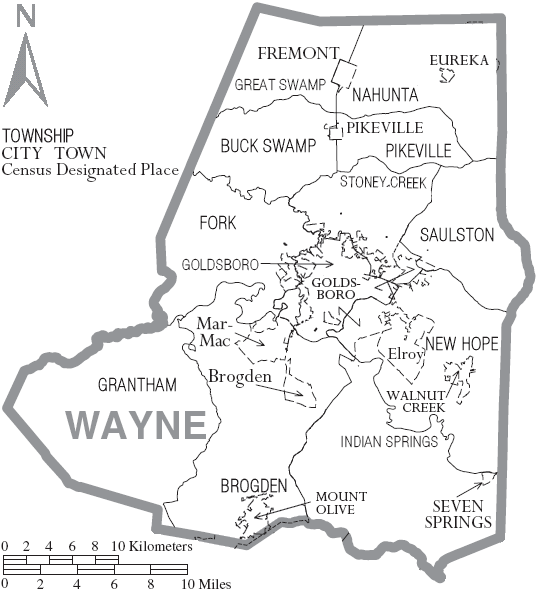
- Location of Buck Swamp Township within Wayne County (northwestern Wayne County)

- Location of Wayne County within North Carolina
- Country: United States
- State: North Carolina
- County: Wayne

Area
  - Total: 31.8 sq mi (82 km^{2})

Population (2020)
  - Total: 7,704
- Time zone: UTC-5 (EST)
  - Summer (DST): UTC-4 (EDT)
- Area codes: 919, 984

Buck Swamp Township is a township in Wayne County, North Carolina, United States. At the 2020 census, the population was 7,704.

== Location ==
Buck Swamp Township is one of 12 townships within Wayne County. It is located in the northwestern portion of the county. The township is bordered to the east by Pikeville Township, which includes the town of Pikeville, and to the west by Boon Hill Township, which includes the town of Princeton. Other neighboring townships include Fork Township, which includes the community of Rosewood, to the south, Stony Creek Township to the southeast, and Great Swamp Township to the north. The southern border of Buck Swamp Township follows the route of the Little River.

== Education ==
The school system for Buck Swamp is operated by Wayne County Public Schools. The township contains Northwest Elementary School (K-5). Norwayne Middle School (6-8), is located in the nearby town of Fremont, and Charles B. Aycock High School (9-12) is located in the nearby town of Pikeville

== Community ==
The community contains three volunteer fire departments, Little River, Nahunta, and Pikeville-Pleasant Grove. Several churches of various denominations are contained within Buck Swamp, including Pleasant Grove Original Free Will Baptist Church, Pikeville Church, Pike's Crossroads Pentecostal Holiness Church, and several other churches. There are various recreational activities to be enjoyed within Buck Swamp, including youth baseball at the Eastern Carolina Athletic Park (ECAP), kayaking along the Little River, and fishing in the many creeks, swamps, and ponds.

== Industry ==
Businesses within this township include Nahunta Pork Center, Benton and Son's Fabricators, Bayer Cropscience Breeding and Trait Development Facility, and Dollar General.

== Famous Figures ==
Stacy Lane Mathews; A drag performer who competed on season 3 of RuPaul's Drag Race.

== Transportation ==
=== Passenger ===
- Air: Raleigh-Durham International Airport is the closest major airport with service to more than 45 domestic and international destinations. Wayne Executive Jetport is an airport located nearby, but is only used for general aviation.
- Interstate Highway: I-795 runs through the Buck Swamp township for approximately 3.5 miles.
- Buck Swamp is not served directly by passenger trains. The closest Amtrak station is located in Selma.
- Bus: The area is served by Greyhound with a location in nearby Goldsboro.

=== Roads ===
- The main highways in Buck Swamp are I-795 and NC 581. Other major roads near Buck Swamp include US 117 to the east and US 70 to the south.
