= Wayne County, North Carolina =

County in North Carolina, United States

- County
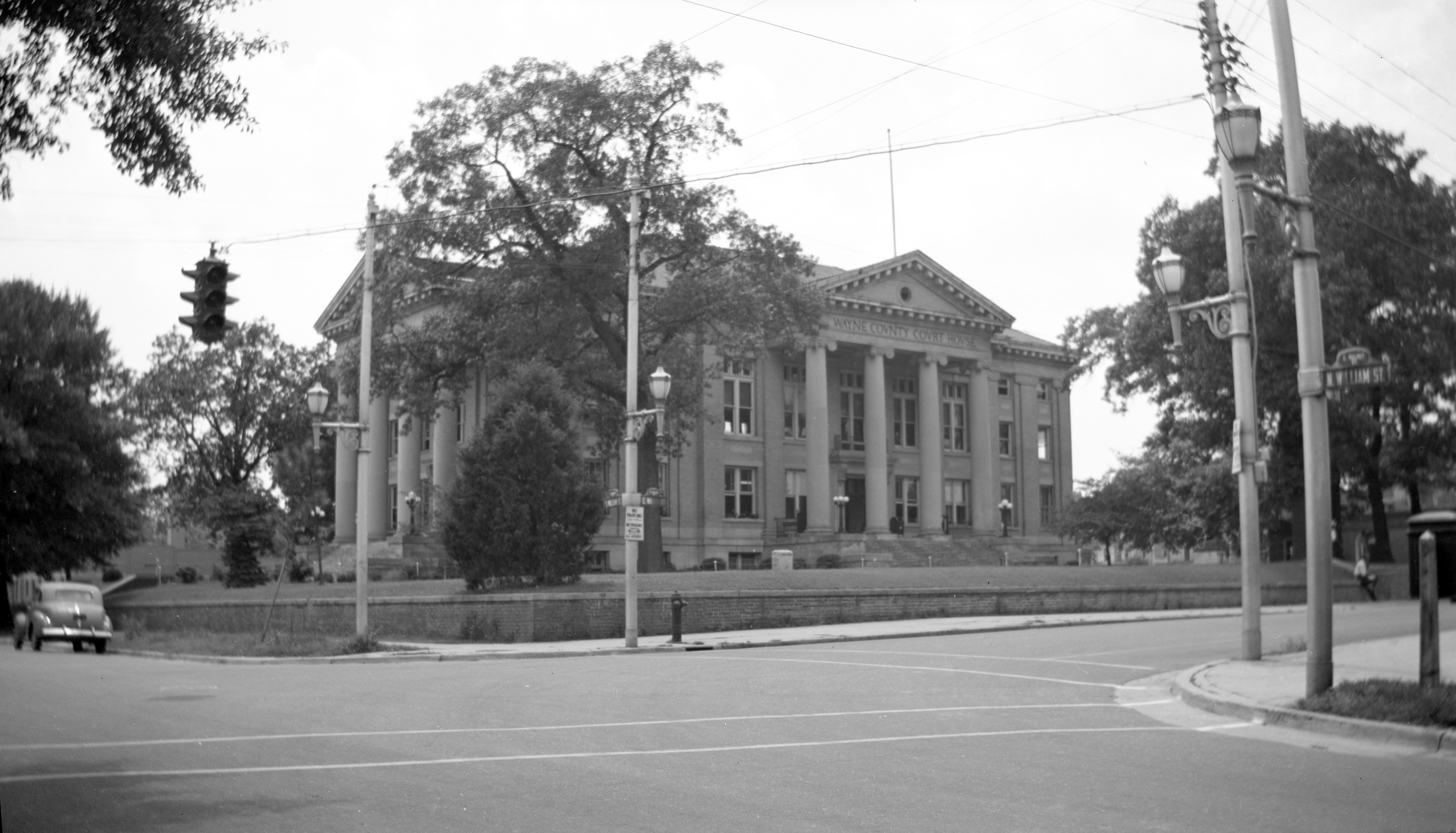
- Wayne County Courthouse in Goldsboro

- Seal

- Location within the U.S. state of North Carolina
- Coordinates: 35.35°N 78.01°W
- Country: United States
- State: North Carolina
- Founded: 1779
- Named for: Anthony Wayne
- Seat: Goldsboro
- Largest community: Goldsboro

Area
  - Total: 557.72 sq mi (1,444.5 km^{2})
  - Land: 553.92 sq mi (1,434.6 km^{2})
  - Water: 3.80 sq mi (9.8 km^{2}) 0.68%

Population (2020)
  - Total: 117,333
  - Estimate (2025): 122,278 ▲
  - Density: 211.74/sq mi (81.75/km^{2})
- Time zone: UTC−5 (Eastern)
  - Summer (DST): UTC−4 (EDT)
- Congressional district: 1st
- Website: www.waynegov.com

Wayne County is a county located in the U.S. state of North Carolina. As of the 2020 census, the population was 117,333. Its county seat is Goldsboro, and it is home to Seymour Johnson Air Force Base.

Wayne County comprises the Goldsboro, North Carolina Metropolitan Statistical Area.

== History ==
Prior to 1730, Native Americans were the only known occupants of the territory now known as Wayne County. Settlers trickled into the territory, occupying land along the Neuse River. There was no general migration here until after 1750; as populations built up in the coastal areas, some settlers moved west for land.

Wayne County was established during the American Revolutionary War on November 2, 1779, from the western part of Dobbs County. It was named for "Mad Anthony" Wayne, a general in the war. The act establishing the county provided that the first court should be held at the home of Josiah Sasser, at which time the justices were to decide on a place for all subsequent courts until a courthouse could be erected. By 1782 the commissioners were named. In 1787 an act was passed establishing Waynesborough on the west side of the Neuse River, on the land of Andrew Bass. The courthouse was built there.

In 1855, parts of Wayne County, Edgecombe County, Johnston County, and Nash County were combined to form Wilson County.

== Geography ==
Interactive map of Wayne County

According to the U.S. Census Bureau, the county has a total area of 557.72 square miles (1,444.5 km^{2}), of which 553.92 square miles (1,434.6 km^{2}) is land and 3.80 square miles (9.8 km^{2}) (0.68%) is water.

Wayne County's surface is level to gently rolling uplands with broad bottoms along the rivers and some creeks. Elevations are predominantly 120 to 145 feet above sea level. The largest waterway, the Neuse River, bisects the lower central portion of the county and cuts a deep channel 20 to 40 feet deep as it flows in an eastward direction. Unusual river bluffs occur in the vicinity of Seven Springs. In addition to the Neuse River, the county is drained by the Little River, the Northeast Cape Fear River and numerous creeks.

Wayne County is underlain by unconsolidated beds of sand, clay and gravel. For the most part, these beds were deposited in seawater as the sea advanced and retreated during the geologic development of the Atlantic Coastal Plain. To a much lesser extent, streams deposited layers of sediment which mixed with that deposited on the sea floor.

The climate in Wayne County is characterized by warm summers and moderate winters. The average temperature is about 62 degrees. Annual precipitation is about 50 inches of rainfall per year, with the major portion occurring in the late spring and summer.

=== State and local protected areas/sites ===
- Charles B. Aycock Birthplace
- Goldsborough Bridge Battlefield
- Cliffs of the Neuse State Park

=== Major water bodies ===
- Bear Creek
- Little River
- Neuse River
- Northeast Cape Fear River
- Quaker Neck Lake
- Water Branch

=== Adjacent counties ===
- Wilson County – north
- Greene County – east-northeast
- Lenoir County – east-southeast
- Duplin County – south
- Sampson County – southwest
- Johnston County – west

=== Major highways ===
- I-42 / Future I-42
- I-795 / Future I-795
- US 13
- US 70
- US 117
- US 117 Alt.
- NC 50
- NC 55
- NC 111
- NC 222
- NC 403
- NC 581

=== Major infrastructure ===
- Goldsboro Union Station
- Seymour Johnson Air Force Base

== Demographics ==
Historical population
Census	Pop.	Note	%±
1790	6,115		—
1800	6,772		10.7%
1810	8,687		28.3%
1820	9,040		4.1%
1830	10,331		14.3%
1840	10,891		5.4%
1850	13,486		23.8%
1860	14,905		10.5%
1870	18,144		21.7%
1880	24,951		37.5%
1890	26,100		4.6%
1900	31,356		20.1%
1910	35,698		13.8%
1920	43,640		22.2%
1930	53,013		21.5%
1940	58,328		10.0%
1950	64,267		10.2%
1960	82,059		27.7%
1970	85,408		4.1%
1980	97,054		13.6%
1990	104,666		7.8%
2000	113,329		8.3%
2010	122,623		8.2%
2020	117,333		−4.3%
2025 (est.)	122,278	▲	4.2%
U.S. Decennial Census; 1790–1960 1900–1990; 1990–2000 2010 2020

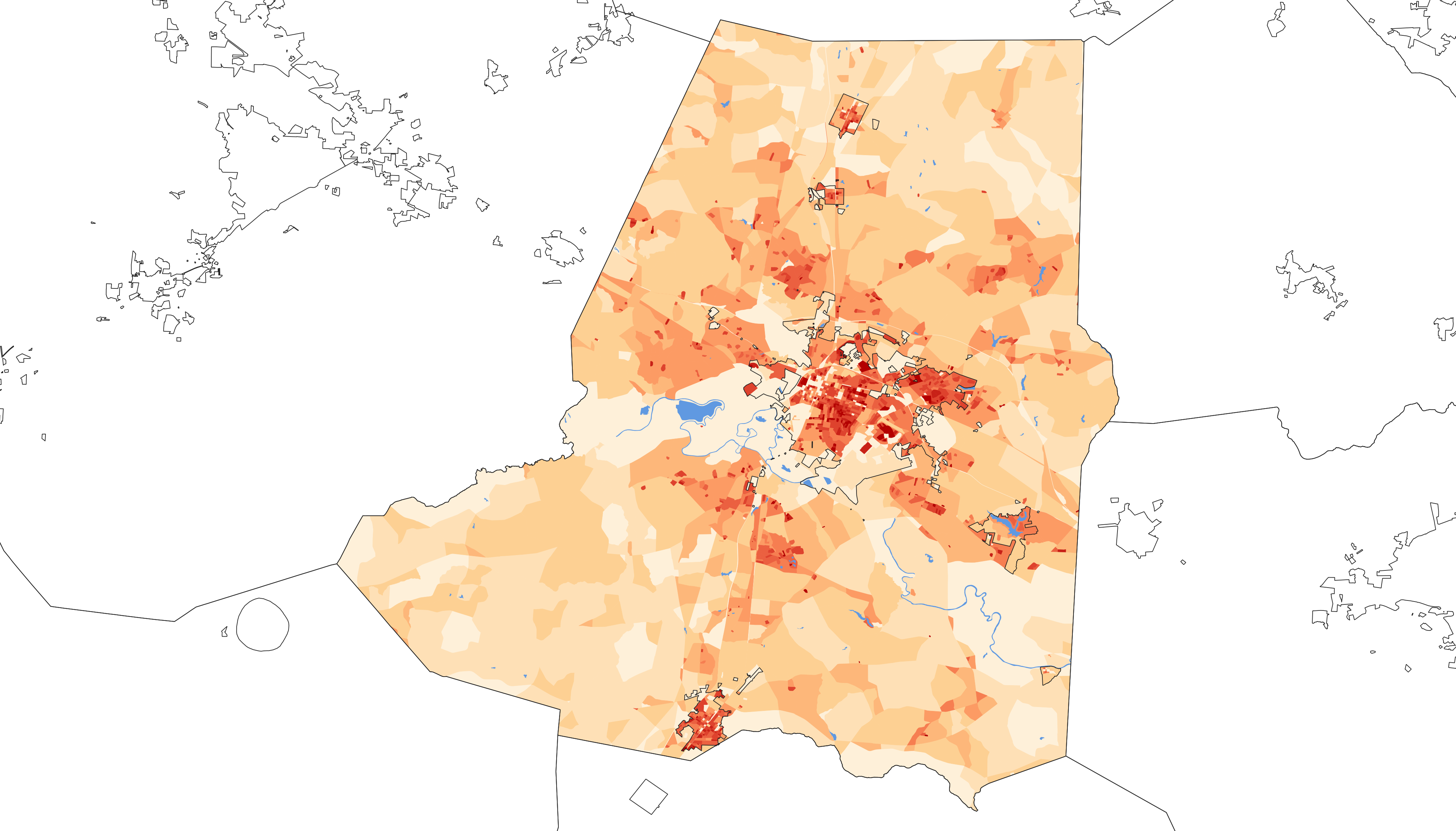
2020 population density of Wayne County NC by census block

=== Racial and ethnic composition ===
Wayne County, North Carolina – Racial and ethnic composition Note: the US Census treats Hispanic/Latino as an ethnic category. This table excludes Latinos from the racial categories and assigns them to a separate category. Hispanics/Latinos may be of any race.
Race / Ethnicity (NH = Non-Hispanic)	Pop 1980	Pop 1990	Pop 2000	Pop 2010	Pop 2020	% 1980	% 1990	% 2000	% 2010	% 2020
White alone (NH)	63,958	68,529	67,756	68,216	60,199	65.90%	65.47%	59.79%	55.63%	51.31%
Black or African American alone (NH)	31,318	33,683	37,230	38,107	35,329	32.27%	32.18%	32.85%	31.08%	30.11%
Native American or Alaska Native alone (NH)	178	241	371	333	335	0.18%	0.23%	0.33%	0.27%	0.29%
Asian alone (NH)	426	815	1,063	1,405	1,542	0.44%	0.78%	0.94%	1.15%	1.31%
Native Hawaiian or Pacific Islander alone (NH)	x	x	34	47	71	x	x	0.03%	0.04%	0.06%
Other race alone (NH)	168	42	126	231	454	0.17%	0.04%	0.11%	0.19%	0.39%
Mixed race or Multiracial (NH)	x	x	1,145	2,122	4,476	x	x	1.01%	1.73%	3.81%
Hispanic or Latino (any race)	1,006	1,356	5,604	12,162	14,927	1.04%	1.30%	4.94%	9.92%	12.72%
Total	97,054	104,666	113,329	122,623	117,333	100.00%	100.00%	100.00%	100.00%	100.00%

=== 2020 census ===
As of the 2020 census, there were 117,333 people, 45,997 households, and 30,990 families residing in the county. The median age was 39.0 years; 22.9% of residents were under the age of 18 and 17.6% of residents were 65 years of age or older. For every 100 females, there were 95.6 males, and for every 100 females age 18 and over, there were 93.1 males age 18 and over.

The racial makeup of the county was 53.2% White, 30.5% Black or African American, 0.6% American Indian and Alaska Native, 1.3% Asian, 0.1% Native Hawaiian and Pacific Islander, 7.8% from some other race, and 6.5% from two or more races. Hispanic or Latino residents of any race comprised 12.7% of the population.

46.4% of residents lived in urban areas, while 53.6% lived in rural areas.

There were 52,551 housing units, of which 12.5% were vacant. Among occupied housing units, 62.4% were owner-occupied and 37.6% were renter-occupied. The homeowner vacancy rate was 1.2% and the rental vacancy rate was 5.4%.

=== 2000 census ===
At the 2000 census, there were 113,329 people, 42,612 households, and 30,254 families residing in the county. The population density was 205 people per square mile (79 people/km^{2}). There were 47,313 housing units at an average density of 86 units per square mile (33 units/km^{2}). The racial makeup of the county was 61.28% White, 33.02% Black or African American, 0.36% Native American, 0.96% Asian, 0.05% Pacific Islander, 3.07% from other races, and 1.25% from two or more races. 4.94% of the population were Hispanic or Latino of any race.

There were 42,612 households, out of which 34.70% had children under the age of 18 living with them, 51.60% were married couples living together, 15.40% had a female householder with no husband present, and 29.00% were non-families. 24.50% of all households were made up of individuals, and 9.00% had someone living alone who was 65 years of age or older. The average household size was 2.55 and the average family size was 3.03.

In the county, the population was spread out, with 26.20% under the age of 18, 9.90% from 18 to 24, 30.50% from 25 to 44, 21.90% from 45 to 64, and 11.60% who were 65 years of age or older. The median age was 35 years. For every 100 females there were 97.30 males. For every 100 females age 18 and over, there were 94.30 males.

The median income for a household in the county was $33,942, and the median income for a family was $40,492. Males had a median income of $28,396 versus $21,854 for females. The per capita income for the county was $17,010. About 10.20% of families and 13.80% of the population were below the poverty line, including 18.60% of those under age 18 and 15.20% of those age 65 or over.

== Government and politics ==
Wayne was historically a typical "Solid South" county for the first two thirds of the twentieth century, as conservative white Democrats had passed a new constitution at the turn of the 20th century that disenfranchised most blacks. North Carolina became a virtually one-party state, with whites generally voting for Democratic Party Candidates.

Following Congressional passage of major civil rights legislation in the mid-1960s, this county's white voters, like most across the South, gradually started to support Republican national candidates and ultimately changed parties, joining the Republicans. But in 1968, they voted for segregationist "American Independent" George Wallace. Since 1972, the white majority of Wayne County has carried it for Republican presidential candidates in every election.

United States presidential election results for Wayne County, North Carolina
Year	Republican		Democratic		Third party(ies)	
Year	No.	%	No.	%	No.	%
1880	2,257	48.19%	2,427	51.81%	0	0.00%
1884	2,542	48.09%	2,744	51.91%	0	0.00%
1888	2,629	48.51%	2,748	50.71%	42	0.78%
1892	1,645	34.31%	2,261	47.15%	889	18.54%
1896	2,248	40.95%	3,215	58.56%	27	0.49%
1900	1,965	38.48%	3,104	60.79%	37	0.72%
1904	1,162	35.69%	2,060	63.27%	34	1.04%
1908	1,504	40.41%	2,207	59.30%	11	0.30%
1912	95	2.71%	2,293	65.46%	1,115	31.83%
1916	1,446	35.48%	2,625	64.40%	5	0.12%
1920	2,822	37.05%	4,794	62.95%	0	0.00%
1924	1,379	28.81%	3,366	70.32%	42	0.88%
1928	4,340	53.85%	3,720	46.15%	0	0.00%
1932	1,631	20.25%	6,365	79.01%	60	0.74%
1936	1,751	19.81%	7,087	80.19%	0	0.00%
1940	1,649	18.59%	7,222	81.41%	0	0.00%
1944	1,914	23.51%	6,228	76.49%	0	0.00%
1948	1,658	19.86%	6,111	73.20%	579	6.94%
1952	4,662	39.04%	7,281	60.96%	0	0.00%
1956	4,220	38.45%	6,756	61.55%	0	0.00%
1960	5,474	41.07%	7,856	58.93%	0	0.00%
1964	7,555	43.55%	9,791	56.45%	0	0.00%
1968	5,678	28.79%	5,338	27.06%	8,709	44.15%
1972	14,352	72.33%	5,234	26.38%	256	1.29%
1976	9,607	50.58%	9,265	48.78%	121	0.64%
1980	12,860	56.31%	9,586	41.98%	390	1.71%
1984	17,961	64.13%	10,011	35.74%	36	0.13%
1988	15,292	62.48%	9,135	37.33%	47	0.19%
1992	14,397	52.29%	10,307	37.44%	2,828	10.27%
1996	16,588	56.44%	11,580	39.40%	1,222	4.16%
2000	20,758	61.26%	13,005	38.38%	121	0.36%
2004	24,883	62.14%	15,076	37.65%	87	0.22%
2008	26,952	54.03%	22,671	45.45%	259	0.52%
2012	27,641	53.83%	23,314	45.40%	397	0.77%
2016	27,540	54.33%	21,770	42.95%	1,379	2.72%
2020	30,709	55.29%	24,215	43.60%	613	1.10%
2024	31,580	57.67%	22,618	41.30%	564	1.03%

Wayne County is governed by a commissioner-manager system, consisting of seven members elected to four-year terms. One commissioner is elected from each of six single-member districts in the county and one is elected at-large countywide. All seven members serve concurrent four-year terms. The partisan elections for the Board of Commissioners are held in November in even-numbered years. The Board elects a chairman and vice-chairman from among its members annually at the first meeting in December. The Board meets on the first and third Tuesday each month.

These are the elected officials representing Wayne County following the 2020 elections.

Position (2020 district borders)	Name	Party	First elected
State Senate District 7	Jim Perry	Republican	2020
State House District 10	John Bell	Republican	2012
State House District 21	Raymond Smith	Democratic	2018
District Attorney	Matthew Delbridge	Republican	2014
Sheriff	Larry Pierce	Republican	2014
Register of Deeds	Constance Bryant Coram	Democratic	2020

Wayne County will be represented in the 13th District in the United States House of Representatives, the 4th District in the North Carolina State House of Representatives, and the 4th and 10th District in the North Carolina State Senate due to the 2020 redistricting cycle.

Wayne County is a member of the regional Eastern Carolina Council of Governments.

== Economy ==
Wayne County's local industries are involved in a range of operations from simple assembly to complex manufacturing processes resulting in products ranging from bread and poultry feed to automobile parts and electric transformers. Substantial technological improvements in recent years involving modernization of plant facilities and the addition of sophisticated manufacturing equipment have resulted in enhanced profitability and productivity for many of the local manufacturing firms.

The combination of a mild climate, a freeze-free growing season of about 225 days and a wide range of soil types contribute to a highly productive agricultural area. Total gross farm sales in Wayne County in 2006 was approximately US$329,082,138. Field crops, including the primary crops of tobacco, corn, cotton, soybeans, and wheat accounted for nearly 12% of the farm income or US$38,583,389.

Income from livestock and poultry production was US$236,287,547 in 2006 and derived primarily from swine operations. Swine production has increased rapidly, making it the single largest source of farm income. In 2006 farm income from swine production was US$75,409,690 or 23% of all farm income. Wayne County ranks 7th in the nation for production of swine.

Seymour Johnson Air Force Base is home to the 4th Fighter Wing and 916th Air Refueling Wing. The annual civilian and military payroll is over $282 millionUSD. In fiscal year 2006 the economic impact at the base totaled over $460 millionUSD.

== Education ==
Wayne County is home to three colleges: Wayne Community College, University of Mount Olive (formerly known as Mount Olive College), and the Goldsboro campus of the North Carolina Wesleyan University.

Public schools are administered by the Wayne County Public Schools system. The public schools include nine high schools and college preparation schools, nine middle schools, fourteen elementary schools and one special education school. The county is also home to one charter public school and six private schools.

=== High schools ===
- Charles B. Aycock High School
- Eastern Wayne High School
- Goldsboro High School
- Rosewood High School
- Southern Wayne High School
- Wayne School of Engineering
- Wayne Early Middle College High School
- Wayne School of Technical Arts
- Spring Creek High School

== Media ==
- The Goldsboro News-Argus
- Mount Olive Tribune

== Hospitals ==
- Wayne UNC Health Care, a medical facility located in Goldsboro, is the county's second-largest employer.
- Cherry Hospital is a psychiatric hospital located in Goldsboro; it was founded in 1880 as a facility to treat mentally ill African Americans when all public facilities were segregated. A museum depicting its history is part of the hospital campus.
- O'Berry Neuro-Medical Center is a North Carolina Department of Health and Human Services hospital providing rehabilitative services to individuals with Down Syndrome and people with developmental disabilities.

== Communities ==
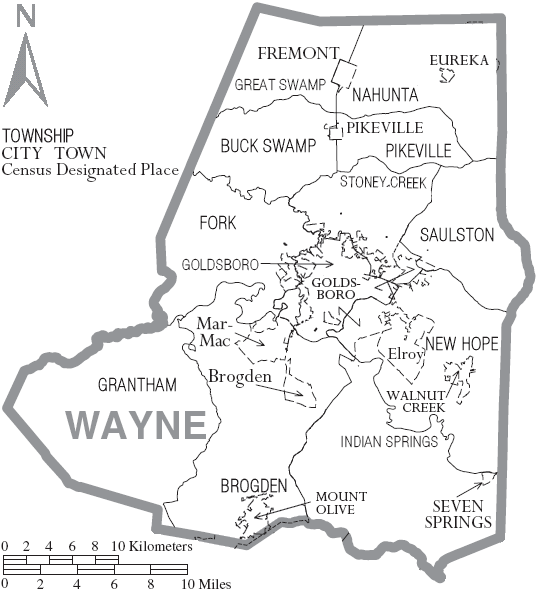
Map of Wayne County with municipal and township labels

=== City ===
- Goldsboro (county seat and largest community)

=== Towns ===
- Eureka
- Fremont
- Mount Olive
- Seven Springs
- Pikeville

=== Villages ===
- Walnut Creek

=== Census-designated places ===
- Brogden
- Dudley
- Elroy
- Mar-Mac
- New Hope

=== Other unincorporated communities ===
- Faro
- Grantham
- Hopewell
- Nahunta
- Rosewood

=== Townships ===
- Brogden
- Buck Swamp
- Fork

== Notable people ==
- Ike Atkinson, drug trafficker
- Charles Brantley Aycock, politician
- Bob Boyd, golfer
- Moira Crone, author
- Ava Gardner, actress
- Anne Jeffreys, actress
- Carl Kasell, radio personality
- Clyde King, baseball
- Martin Lancaster, former president of the North Carolina Community College System
- Manny Lawson, NFL linebacker
- Jerry Narron, MLB player, coach, and manager
- Tony Schiffman, jeweler
- John R. Smith, politician
- Michale Spicer, NFL defensive end
- Greg Warren, NFL long snapper
- James B. Whitfield, lawyer
- Cadmus M. Wilcox, Confederate general

== See also ==
- List of North Carolina counties
- National Register of Historic Places listings in Wayne County, North Carolina
- Kinston Regional Jetport, closest airport to Wayne County
- 1961 Goldsboro B-52 crash, plane crash involving a Boeing B-52 Stratofortress carrying 3 to 4 nuclear bombs near Goldsboro
