= Quintin Williams =

American football player (born 1982)

No. 38
- Position: Safety

Personal information
- Born: September 24, 1982 (age 44); Goldsboro, North Carolina, U.S.
- Listed height: 5 ft 11 in (1.80 m)
- Listed weight: 204 lb (93 kg)

Career information
- High school: Rosewood (Rosewood, North Carolina)
- College: Wake Forest (2000–2003)
- NFL draft: 2004: undrafted

Career history
- Miami Dolphins (2004)

Career NFL statistics
- Games played: 6
- Tackles: 4
- Stats at Pro Football Reference

Quintin Wayne Williams (born September 24, 1982) is an American former professional football safety who played in the National Football League (NFL) for the Miami Dolphins. He played college football for the Wake Forest Demon Deacons.

== Early life ==
Williams was born on September 24, 1982, in Goldsboro, North Carolina. He attended Rosewood High School in Rosewood, North Carolina. Williams rushed for over 1,000 yards in three straight years and a four-time all-conference selection.

== College career ==
Williams played college football for the Wake Forest Demon Deacons from 2000 to 2003. As a true freshman, he became a starting cornerback and halfway through his sophomore year, he moved to free safety. Williams had eight interceptions for 148 yards in 44 games. As a senior, he played in the Blue–Gray Football Classic.

== Professional career ==
Pre-draft measurables
Height	Weight	Arm length	Hand span	40-yard dash	10-yard split	20-yard split	20-yard shuttle	Three-cone drill	Vertical jump	Broad jump	Bench press
5 ft 11 in (1.80 m)	207 lb (94 kg)	31 1/8 in (0.79 m)	9 1/4 in (0.23 m)	4.59 s	1.59 s	2.67 s	4.09 s	7.28 s	37 in (0.94 m)	10 ft 2 in (3.10 m)	21 reps
All values from NFL Combine

After going undrafted in the 2004 NFL draft, Williams signed with the Miami Dolphins as an undrafted free agent. On September 5, he was waived and signed to the practice squad. On November 15, Williams was elevated to the active roster. He played in the final six games of the season, recording four tackles.

On June 24, 2005, Williams was waived by the Dolphins following an arrest for DUI and drag racing charges.
