= Walnut Creek, North Carolina =

- Village
- Location within the state of North Carolina
- Coordinates: 35°18′27″N 77°52′17″W
- Country: United States
- State: North Carolina
- County: Wayne

Government
  - Mayor: Darrell Horne

Area
  - Total: 2.43 sq mi (6.30 km^{2})
  - Land: 2.13 sq mi (5.51 km^{2})
  - Water: 0.31 sq mi (0.80 km^{2})
- Elevation: 72 ft (22 m)

Population (2020)
  - Total: 1,084
  - Density: 509.9/sq mi (196.88/km^{2})
- Time zone: UTC-5 (Eastern (EST))
  - Summer (DST): UTC-4 (EDT)
- ZIP code: 27534
- Area code: 919
- FIPS code: 37-70820
- GNIS feature ID: 2407566
- Website: www.walnutcreeknc.com

Walnut Creek is a village in Wayne County, North Carolina, United States. As of the 2020 census, Walnut Creek had a population of 1,084. It is included in the Goldsboro, North Carolina Metropolitan Statistical Area.

The village is built around the Walnut Creek Country Club.

== Geography ==
According to the United States Census Bureau, the village has a total area of 1.9 square miles (4.8 km^{2}), of which, 1.5 square miles (4.0 km^{2}) of it is land and 0.3 square miles (0.8 km^{2}) of it (17.20%) is water.

== Demographics ==
Historical population
Census	Pop.	Note	%±
1980	343		—
1990	623		81.6%
2000	859		37.9%
2010	835		−2.8%
2020	1,084		29.8%
U.S. Decennial Census

As of the census of 2000, there were 859 people, 322 households, and 293 families residing in the village. The population density was 556.1 inhabitants per square mile (214.7/km^{2}). There were 332 housing units at an average density of 214.9 per square mile (83.0/km^{2}). The racial makeup of the village was 95.23% White, 1.63% African American, 0.12% Native American, 2.10% Asian, and 0.93% from two or more races.

There were 322 households, out of which 33.5% had children under the age of 18 living with them, 87.6% were married couples living together, 3.1% had a female householder with no husband present, and 8.7% were non-families. 7.5% of all households were made up of individuals, and 2.5% had someone living alone who was 65 years of age or older. The average household size was 2.67 and the average family size was 2.80.

In the village, the population was spread out, with 22.7% under the age of 18, 3.5% from 18 to 24, 18.2% from 25 to 44, 40.3% from 45 to 64, and 15.4% who were 65 years of age or older. The median age was 48 years. For every 100 females, there were 95.7 males. For every 100 females age 18 and over, there were 94.7 males.

The median income for a household in the village was $96,037, and the median income for a family was $98,071. Males had a median income of $80,000 versus $27,292 for females. The per capita income for the village was $45,070. None of the population or families were below the poverty line.

== Education ==
Education in Walnut Creek is administered by the Wayne County Public Schools system with children attending schools in nearby townships. Higher education is offered through Wayne Community College in Goldsboro.

== Transportation ==
=== Passenger ===
- Air: Walnut Creek is served through nearby Kinston Regional Jetport (IATA: ISO, ICAO: KISO) with service to Orlando, Florida. Raleigh-Durham International Airport is the closest major airport with service to more than 45 domestic and international destinations. Goldsboro-Wayne Municipal Airport is an airport located in Wayne County, but is only used for general aviation.
- Interstate Highway: I-795 is the closest Interstate to Walnut Creek, which is located 10 miles west in Goldsboro.
- Walnut Creek is not served directly by passenger trains. The closest Amtrak station is located in Selma.
- Bus: The area is served by Greyhound with a location in nearby Goldsboro.

=== Roads ===
- The main highway in Walnut Creek is US 70.
