= Seven Springs, North Carolina =

- Town
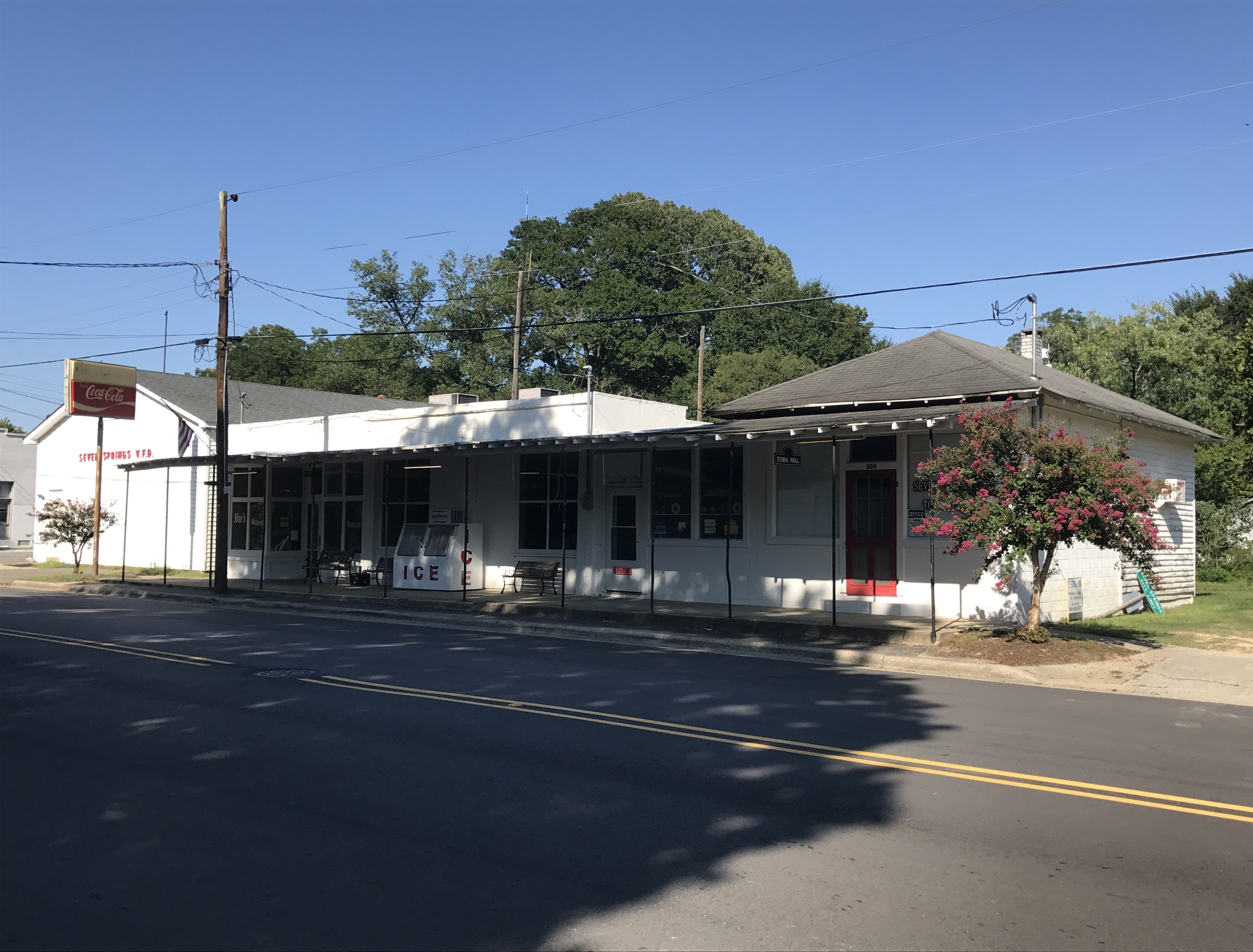
- Town hall

- Location within the state of North Carolina
- Coordinates: 35°13′29″N 77°50′42″W
- Country: United States
- State: North Carolina
- County: Wayne

Area
  - Total: 0.34 sq mi (0.88 km^{2})
  - Land: 0.34 sq mi (0.88 km^{2})
  - Water: 0 sq mi (0.00 km^{2})
- Elevation: 72 ft (22 m)

Population (2020)
  - Total: 55
  - Density: 162.6/sq mi (62.77/km^{2})
- Time zone: UTC-5 (Eastern (EST))
  - Summer (DST): UTC-4 (EDT)
- ZIP code: 28578
- Area code: 252
- FIPS code: 37-60540
- GNIS feature ID: 2407314
- Website: townofsevensprings.com

Seven Springs is a town in Wayne County, North Carolina, United States. It lies next to the Neuse River. As of the 2020 census, Seven Springs had a population of 55. It is included in the Goldsboro, North Carolina Metropolitan Statistical Area.

== History ==
The town was incorporated as Whitehall in 1855, named in homage to the 1741 home of planter William Whitefield. In December 1862, during the American Civil War, a battle was fought near the town. In 1881 the community was reincorporated as White Hall. That year a hotel and resort opened to bring customers to seven mineral springs in the town's vicinity. The resort closed in 1944. In 1951 the town was renamed Seven Springs. Seven Springs' population peaked in 1960 with 207 residents. In 1999 the Neuse River flooded during Hurricane Floyd, causing the town's population to halve. Hurricane Matthew in 2016 and Hurricane Florence in 2018 led to further decline; by 2020, the town had only 55 residents, and many of the businesses on the principal street in the community were left abandoned.

== Geography ==
According to the United States Census Bureau, the town has a total area of 0.3 square miles (0.78 km^{2}), all of it land. It sits along the Neuse River.

== Demographics ==
Historical population
Census	Pop.	Note	%±
1900	114		—
1910	179		57.0%
1920	164		−8.4%
1930	156		−4.9%
1940	170		9.0%
1950	197		15.9%
1960	207		5.1%
1970	188		−9.2%
1980	166		−11.7%
1990	163		−1.8%
2000	86		−47.2%
2010	110		27.9%
2020	55		−50.0%
U.S. Decennial Census

As of the census of 2010, there were 110 people, 43 households, and 27 families residing in the town. The population density was 261.9 inhabitants per square mile (101.1/km^{2}). There were 67 housing units at an average density of 204.1 per square mile (78.8/km^{2}). The racial makeup of the town was 81.8% White and 8.2% African American.

There were 43 households, out of which 14.0% had children under the age of 18 living with them, 44.2% were married couples living together, 18.6% had a female householder with no husband present, and 34.9% were non-families. 32.6% of all households were made up of individuals, and 23.3% had someone living alone who was 65 years of age or older. The average household size was 2.00 and the average family size was 2.32.

In the town, the population was spread out, with 17.4% under the age of 18, 4.7% from 18 to 24, 20.9% from 25 to 44, 23.3% from 45 to 64, and 33.7% who were 65 years of age or older. The median age was 50 years. For every 100 females, there were 87.0 males. For every 100 females age 18 and over, there were 69.0 males.

The median income for a household in the town was $28,750, and the median income for a family was $29,063. Males had a median income of $29,375 versus $26,250 for females. The per capita income for the town was $46,922. There were no families and 8.0% of the population living below the poverty line, including no under eighteens and 16.0% of those over 64.

== Education ==
Education in Seven Springs is administered by the Wayne County Public Schools system. Spring Creek Middle School and Spring Creek High School are located within the community. Higher education is offered through Wayne Community College in Goldsboro.

== Notable people ==
- Rachel Darden Davis, physician and politician

== Works cited ==
- Powell, William S. (1976). The North Carolina Gazetteer: A Dictionary of Tar Heel Places. Chapel Hill: The University of North Carolina Press. ISBN 9780807812471.
