= Elroy, North Carolina =

- CDP
- Location within the state of North Carolina
- Coordinates: 35°19′51″N 77°55′21″W
- Country: United States
- State: North Carolina
- County: Wayne

Area
  - Total: 6.54 sq mi (16.93 km^{2})
  - Land: 6.54 sq mi (16.93 km^{2})
  - Water: 0 sq mi (0.00 km^{2})
- Elevation: 115 ft (35 m)

Population (2020)
  - Total: 3,755
  - Density: 574.6/sq mi (221.84/km^{2})
- Time zone: UTC-5 (Eastern (EST))
  - Summer (DST): UTC-4 (EDT)
- FIPS code: 37-21130
- GNIS feature ID: 2402453

Elroy is a census-designated place in Wayne County, North Carolina, United States. As of the 2020 census, Elroy had a population of 3,755. It is included in the Goldsboro, North Carolina Metropolitan Statistical Area.

== Geography ==
According to the United States Census Bureau, the CDP has a total area of 6.4 square miles (17 km^{2}), all of it land.

== Demographics ==
Historical population
Census	Pop.	Note	%±
2020	3,755		—
U.S. Decennial Census

=== 2020 census ===
As of the 2020 census, the CDP had a population of 3,755. The median age was 37.4 years. 21.8% of residents were under the age of 18 and 16.4% of residents were 65 years of age or older. For every 100 females there were 98.8 males, and for every 100 females age 18 and over there were 95.0 males age 18 and over.

79.3% of residents lived in urban areas, while 20.7% lived in rural areas.

There were 1,537 households in the CDP, of which 26.8% had children under the age of 18 living in them. Of all households, 44.6% were married-couple households, 20.3% were households with a male householder and no spouse or partner present, and 28.1% were households with a female householder and no spouse or partner present. About 32.4% of all households were made up of individuals and 14.3% had someone living alone who was 65 years of age or older.

There were 1,701 housing units, of which 9.6% were vacant. The homeowner vacancy rate was 1.0% and the rental vacancy rate was 8.2%.

Racial composition as of the 2020 census
Race	Number	Percent
White	1,891	50.4%
Black or African American	867	23.1%
American Indian and Alaska Native	34	0.9%
Asian	74	2.0%
Native Hawaiian and Other Pacific Islander	0	0.0%
Some other race	578	15.4%
Two or more races	311	8.3%
Hispanic or Latino (of any race)	796	21.2%

=== 2000 census ===
As of the 2000 census, there were 3,896 people, 1,534 households, and 1,087 families residing in the CDP. The population density was 606.4 inhabitants per square mile (234.1/km^{2}). There were 1,718 housing units at an average density of 267.4 per square mile (103.2/km^{2}). The racial makeup of the CDP was 70.87% White, 21.20% African American, 0.21% Native American, 1.93% Asian, 4.03% from other races, and 1.77% from two or more races. Hispanic or Latino of any race were 6.88% of the population.

There were 1,534 households, out of which 33.9% had children under the age of 18 living with them, 53.8% were married couples living together, 12.4% had a female householder with no husband present, and 29.1% were non-families. 23.3% of all households were made up of individuals, and 5.7% had someone living alone who was 65 years of age or older. The average household size was 2.54 and the average family size was 2.99.

In the CDP, the population was spread out, with 24.9% under the age of 18, 10.5% from 18 to 24, 32.0% from 25 to 44, 23.1% from 45 to 64, and 9.4% who were 65 years of age or older. The median age was 35 years. For every 100 females, there were 104.8 males. For every 100 females age 18 and over, there were 102.6 males.

The median income for a household in the CDP was $35,286, and the median income for a family was $37,853. Males had a median income of $25,943 versus $21,776 for females. The per capita income for the CDP was $17,197. About 10.1% of families and 11.5% of the population were below the poverty line, including 15.4% of those under age 18 and 14.5% of those age 65 or over.

== Education ==
Education in Elroy is administered by the Wayne County Public School system with children attending schools in nearby townships. Higher education is offered through Wayne Community College in Goldsboro.

== Transportation ==
=== Passenger ===
- Air: Elroy is served through nearby Kinston Regional Jetport (IATA: ISO, ICAO: KISO) with service to Orlando, Florida. Raleigh-Durham International Airport is the closest major airport with service to more than 45 domestic and international destinations. Goldsboro-Wayne Municipal Airport is an airport located nearby, but is only used for general aviation.
- Interstate Highway: I-795 is the closest Interstate to Elroy, which is located 6.5 miles west in Goldsboro.
- Elroy is not served directly by passenger trains. The closest Amtrak station is located in Selma.
- Bus: The area is served by Greyhound with a location in nearby Goldsboro.

=== Roads ===
- The main highway in Elroy is US 70. NC 111 also that runs through the area.
