= Nahunta =

Nahunta can refer to:

- Nahunta, Georgia
- Nahunta, North Carolina
- USS Nahunta, a US Navy barge, named after the city in Georgia
