= Hurricane Florence =

Category 4 Atlantic hurricane in 2018

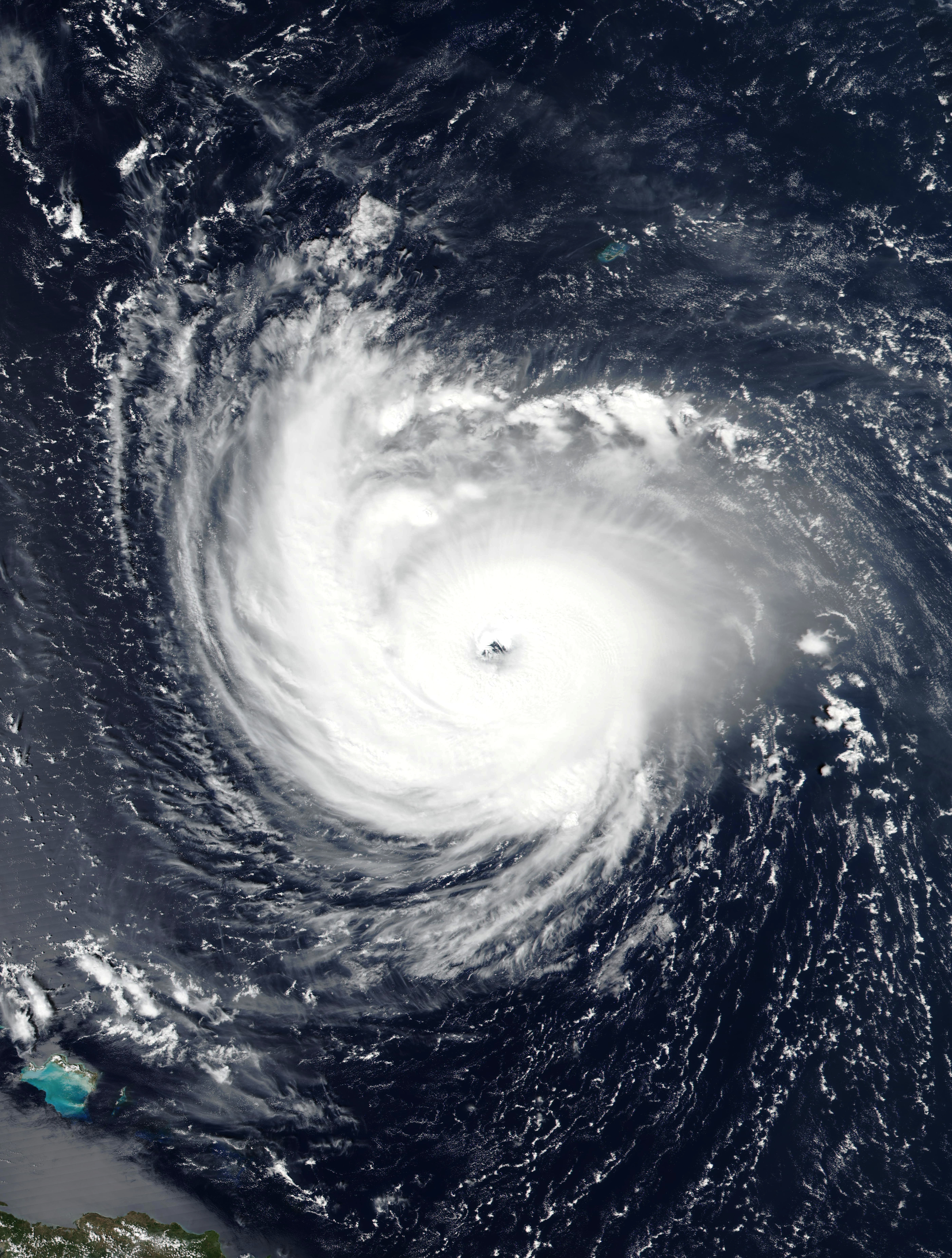
- Florence at peak intensity south of Bermuda on September 11

Meteorological history
- Formed: August 31, 2018
- Extratropical: September 17, 2018
- Dissipated: September 18, 2018

Category 4 major hurricane
- 1-minute sustained (SSHWS/NWS)
- Highest winds: 150 mph (240 km/h)
- Lowest pressure: 937 mbar (hPa); 27.67 inHg

Overall effects
- Fatalities: 54 (24 direct, 30 indirect)
- Damage: $24.2 billion (2018 USD)
- Areas affected: West Africa, Cape Verde, Bermuda, East Coast of the United States (especially the Carolinas), Atlantic Canada
- IBTrACS
- Part of the 2018 Atlantic hurricane season

Hurricane Florence was a powerful and long-lived tropical cyclone that caused catastrophic damage in the Carolinas in September 2018, primarily as a result of freshwater flooding due to torrential rain. The sixth named storm, third hurricane, and the first major hurricane of the 2018 Atlantic hurricane season, Florence originated from a strong tropical wave that emerged off the west coast of Africa on August 30, 2018. The wave steadily organized, and strengthened into a tropical depression on the next day near Cape Verde. Progressing along a steady west-northwest trajectory, the system gradually strengthened, acquiring tropical storm strength on September 1. An unexpected bout of rapid intensification ensued on September 4–5, culminating with Florence becoming a Category 4 major hurricane on the Saffir–Simpson scale (SSHWS), with estimated maximum sustained winds of 130 mph (215 km/h). Strong wind shear then led to rapid weakening, and Florence weakened to tropical storm strength on September 7. Shifting steering currents led to a westward turn into a more suitable environment; as a result, Florence reintensified to hurricane strength on September 9 and major hurricane status by the following day. Florence reached peak intensity on September 11, with 1-minute winds of 150 mph (240 km/h) and a minimum central pressure of 937 mbar (27.7 inHg). An unexpected eyewall replacement cycle and decreasing oceanic heat content caused a steady weakening trend; however, the storm grew in size at the same time. Early on September 14, Florence made landfall in the United States just south of Wrightsville Beach, North Carolina as a Category 1 hurricane, and weakened further as it slowly moved inland under the influence of weak steering currents. Florence degenerated into a post-tropical cyclone over West Virginia on September 17 and was absorbed by another frontal storm two days later.

Early in the storm's history, the system brought squalls to the Cape Verde islands, resulting in minor landslides and flooding; however, overall effects remained negligible. With the threat of a major impact in the Southeastern and Mid-Atlantic United States becoming evident by September 7, the governors of North Carolina, South Carolina, Virginia, Georgia, and Maryland, and the mayor of Washington, D.C. declared a state of emergency. On September 10 and 11, the states of North Carolina, South Carolina, and Virginia issued mandatory evacuation orders for some of their coastal communities, predicting that emergency personnel would be unable to reach people there once the storm arrived. Though Florence made landfall as a greatly weakened Category 1 hurricane, winds associated with the tropical cyclone were strong enough to uproot trees and power lines, causing extensive power outages across the Carolinas. Furthermore, due to the slow motion of the storm, heavy rain fell throughout the Carolinas for several days. Coupled with a powerful storm surge, the rainfall caused widespread flooding along a long stretch of the North Carolina coast, from New Bern to Wilmington. Inland flooding from Florence inundated cities such as Fayetteville, Smithfield, Lumberton, Durham, and Chapel Hill. Most major roads and highways in the area experienced flooding, with large stretches of I-40, I-95, and US Route 70 remaining impassable for days after the storm's passage. Wilmington was cut off entirely from the rest of the mainland by the flooding. The storm also spawned tornadoes in several places along its path, including an EF2 tornado that killed one person in Virginia. Many places received record-breaking rainfall, with Florence setting maximum rainfall records from a tropical cyclone in both of the Carolinas. Overall, the storm caused $24.23 billion in damage, mostly in the Carolinas, and 54 deaths.

== Meteorological history ==
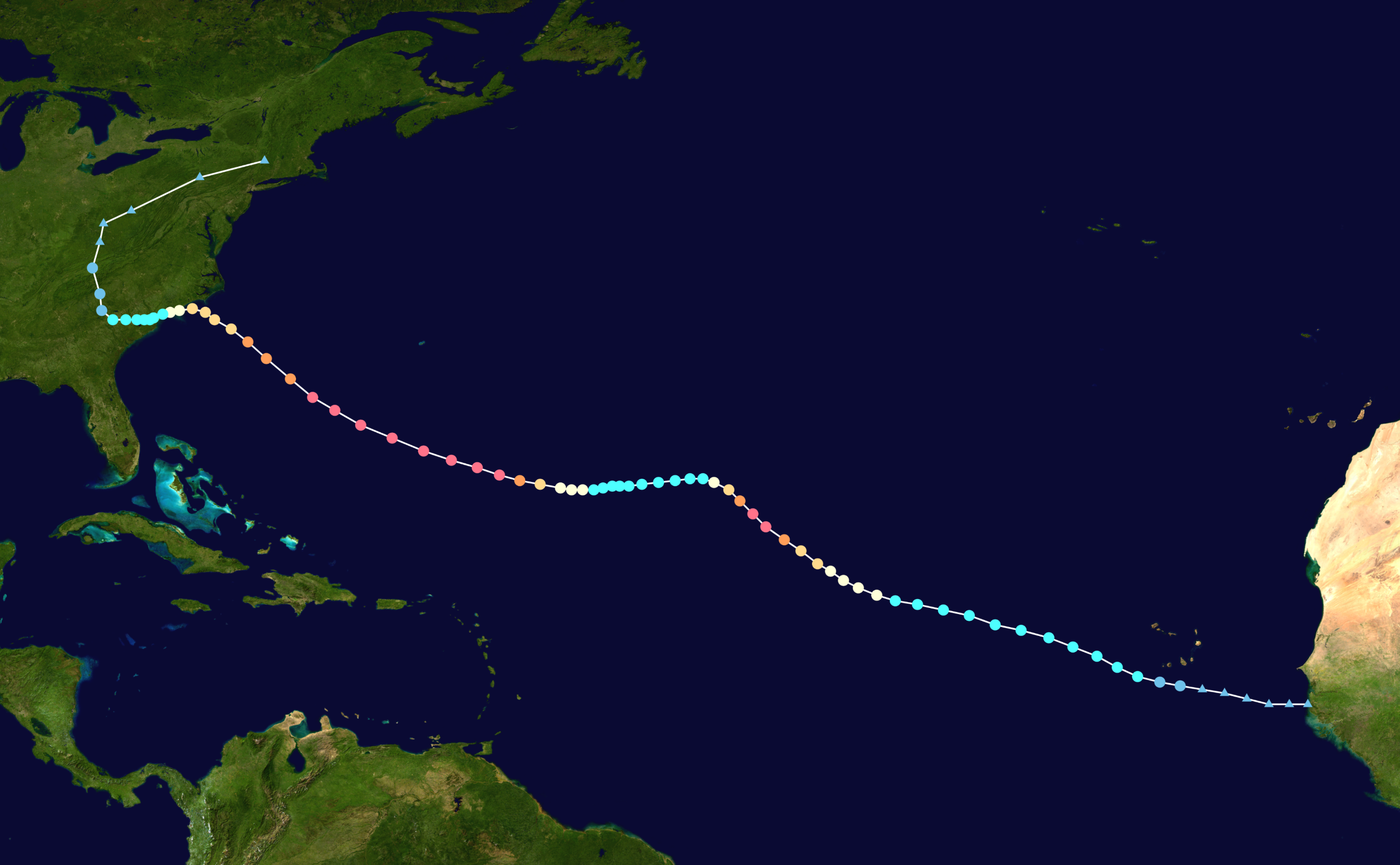
Map plotting the storm's track and intensity, according to the Saffir–Simpson scale Map key Saffir–Simpson scale Tropical depression (≤38 mph, ≤62 km/h) Tropical storm (39–73 mph, 63–118 km/h) Category 1 (74–95 mph, 119–153 km/h) Category 2 (96–110 mph, 154–177 km/h) Category 3 (111–129 mph, 178–208 km/h) Category 4 (130–156 mph, 209–251 km/h) Category 5 (≥157 mph, ≥252 km/h) Unknown Storm type Tropical cyclone Subtropical cyclone Extratropical cyclone, remnant low, tropical disturbance, or monsoon depression

On August 28, 2018, the National Hurricane Center (NHC) began monitoring a tropical wave—an elongated trough of low air pressure—over Western Africa for possible tropical cyclogenesis within the subsequent five days. As it progressed westwards under the influence of easterly trade winds, favorable environmental conditions, including ample moisture and low wind shear, enabled further organization of the wave and the development of broad shower and thunderstorm activity. Though the tropical wave lacked a well-defined low-level circulation center, the NHC began issuing advisories on the system as Potential Tropical Cyclone Six later that day as the system was threatening Cape Verde. Easterly trade winds propelled the disturbance along a west to west-northwest trajectory. Toward the end of August 31, the system's convective organization became sufficient for the NHC to upgrade the disturbance to Tropical Depression Six south of Santiago in Cape Verde. While the storm came under the steering influence of a strong subtropical ridge to the north the following day, moderate wind shear temporarily stunted development and displaced convection to the eastern side of the depression. Later, however, pronounced banding features developed around the circulation, prompting the NHC to upgrade the depression to Tropical Storm Florence at 09:00 UTC on September 1.

Development of a small central dense overcast and a mid-level eye feature signified Florence's intensification to hurricane strength early on September 4, roughly 1,240 miles (2,000 km) west-northwest of Cape Verde. Shortly thereafter, the system unexpectedly rapidly intensified within a small area of low wind shear in an otherwise adverse upper-level environment; the hurricane's core structure, eye, and outer banding improved markedly, catching forecasters off-guard and intensifying beyond model outputs. On September 5, the tropical cyclone reached an initial peak intensity with 1-minute sustained winds of 130 mph (215 km/h) with a central pressure of 950 millibars (28 inHg), making it as a Category 4 hurricane on the Saffir–Simpson scale. Thereafter, increasing wind shear caused the hurricane to rapidly weaken to tropical storm strength by September 8. A building mid-level ridge halted Florence's northward movement, leading to a westward turn.

Hurricane Florence on September 13, 2018, as seen from the International Space Station

Environmental conditions became increasingly conducive to reorganization on September 8 as NOAA Hurricane Hunters began reconnaissance of the cyclone, with the shear decreasing and warm waters becoming deeper. Convective banding blossomed around the storm and a formative eye appeared on satellite imagery. The storm's central dense overcast became more defined, and a complete eyewall developed within its core. Florence reattained hurricane-status by 12:00 UTC on September 9, with the Hurricane Hunters observing 76 mph (122 km/h) sustained winds at the surface. Fueled by sea surface temperatures of 29 to 29.5 °C (84 to 85 °F), Florence rapidly reintensified overnight, and Convective bursts with frequent lightning surrounded the eyewall, giving rise to a well-defined 12 mi (19 km) wide eye. Expanding outflow ventilated the cyclone, enabling continued growth. The system rapidly re-achieved Category 4 intensity by 16:00 UTC on September 10, and Florence reached peak intensity at 18:00 UTC on September 11, with sustained winds of 150 mph (240 km/h) and a minimum central pressure of 937 mbar (hPa; 27.67 inHg). Steady weakening occurred thereafter due to an eyewall replacement cycle and a less favorable environment. At this point, the future track of the hurricane became increasingly uncertain as models predicted a collapse of steering currents.

Steady weakening continued as the hurricane approached North Carolina, and Florence fell below major hurricane status late on September 12. On the following day, steering currents collapsed, which caused Florence to slow down greatly while moving towards the North Carolina coast. At 11:15 UTC (7:15 a.m. EDT) on September 14, Florence made landfall just south of Wrightsville Beach, North Carolina as a Category 1 hurricane, with sustained winds of 90 mph (150 km/h) and a central pressure of 956 mbar (28.2 inHg). The hurricane's sluggish movement resulted in widespread, catastrophic rainfall throughout North and South Carolina. After making landfall, the tropical cyclone began to rapidly weaken due to the frictional effects of land, and Florence weakened to a tropical depression on September 16 before transitioning into an extratropical cyclone the following day. Florence's remnant low dissipated over Massachusetts on September 18. However, the remnants of Florence subsequently emerged into the Atlantic, before splitting into two separate storms. The system to the south would eventually become Subtropical Storm Leslie several days later.

== Preparations ==
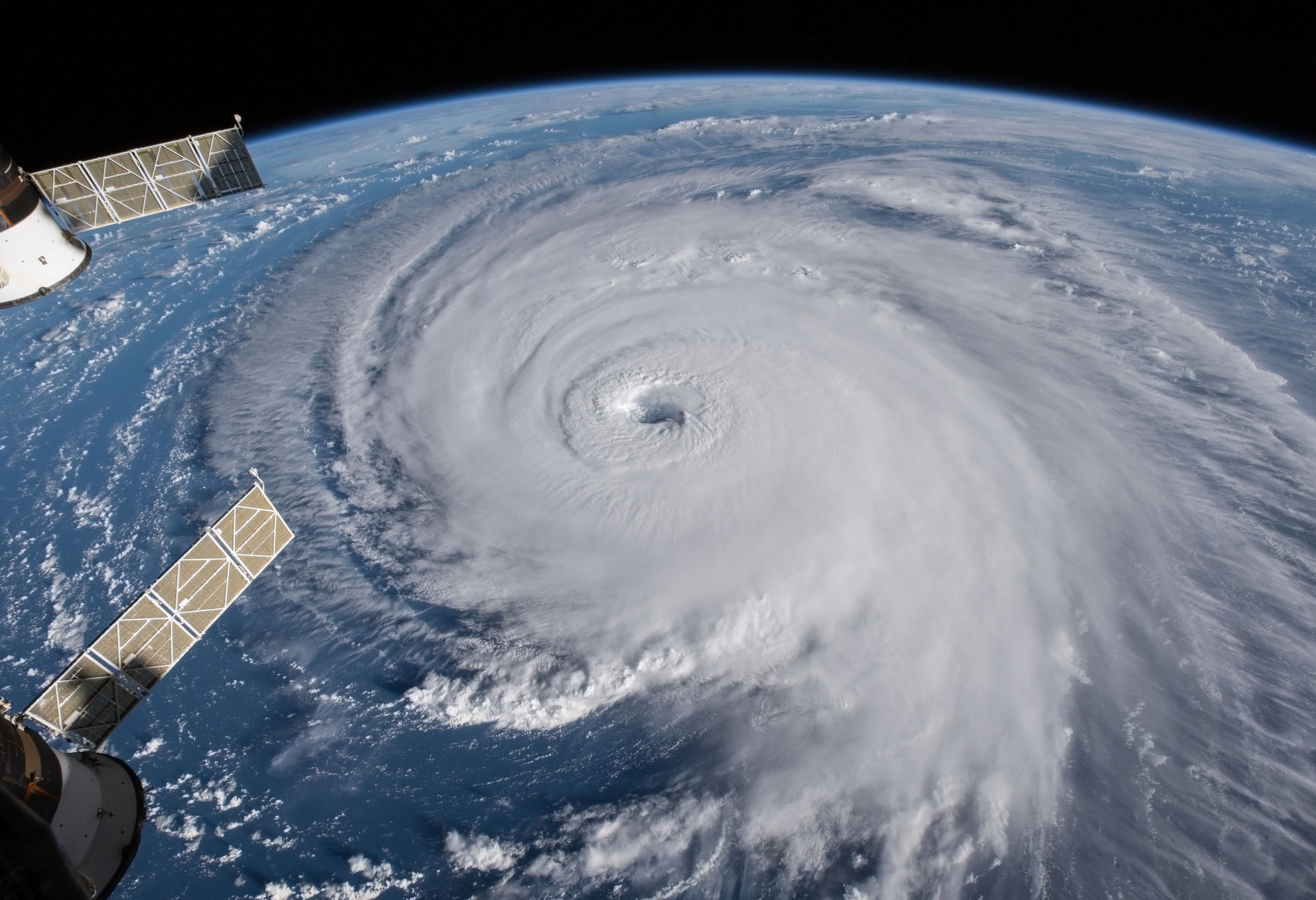
Florence viewed from the International Space Station on September 12

=== Cape Verde and Bermuda ===
Upon the designation of Potential Tropical Cyclone Six on August 30, the government of Cape Verde issued tropical storm warnings for the islands of Brava, Fogo, and Santiago. Domestic airlines cancelled 20 flights on August 31 and September 1; maritime travel was also suspended for this period. Mariners were advised to remain cautious of large swells around the islands, potentially reaching 9.8 to 16.4 ft (3 to 5 m). Under the threat of damaging waves, the Autoridade Nacional de Proteção Civil evacuated 125 people, primarily elderly, from Furna and Rincão. Eleven military personnel were deployed to Rincão to assist in evacuations and preparations. Tropical storm warnings were discontinued on September 1, as the system progressed westward and no longer posed a threat to the archipelago.

In anticipation of adverse conditions, Norwegian Cruise Lines and Oceania Cruises adjusted itineraries for Norwegian Escape, Norwegian Dawn, and Sirena to avoid crossing the hurricane's path and not dock in Bermuda.

=== United States ===
President Donald Trump holding a briefing in the Oval Office in advance of Hurricane Florence

As forecast models indicated an increasing threat to the Southeastern United States, North Carolina Governor Roy Cooper declared a state of emergency on September 7. Transportation rules for farmers were waived to enable faster harvesting. President Donald Trump declared an emergency in North Carolina, granting the state access to federal funds. An overnight curfew was established for Lumberton for the duration of the hurricane. The cost of hurricane preparation in Virginia were at US$10.8 million.

South Carolina Governor Henry McMaster followed suit on the next day. The South Carolina Emergency Management Division (SCEMD) and Harvest Hope Food Bank began mobilizing resources for potential recovery efforts. The SCEMD raised operation conditions to level 3 on September 9, and began preparations for the "possibility of a large-scale disaster", with forecasts showing Florence striking the state as a major hurricane. Local officials established overnight curfews for the cities of Aynor, Conway, Dillon, Myrtle Beach, and Surfside Beach to limit the number of people on the roads and enable effective emergency responses. The entirety of Horry and Marion counties also fell under curfews.

On September 8, Virginia Governor Ralph Northam also declared a state of emergency. On September 10, Maryland Governor Larry Hogan declared a state of emergency for the entire state, with the potential of "historic, catastrophic and life-threatening flooding in Maryland". On September 11, Washington, D.C. Mayor Muriel Bowser declared a state of emergency for the entire District of Columbia due to the "imminent threats on the people of D.C., including threats to health, safety and welfare" caused by Florence. On September 12, Georgia Governor Nathan Deal issued a state of emergency for the entire state.

==== Evacuation and closures ====
"They haven't seen anything like what's coming at us in 25, 30 years, maybe ever. It's tremendously big and tremendously wet."

— President Donald Trump, September 11, 2018, White House press briefing

Mandatory evacuation orders for residents and tourists on Hatteras Island in Dare County began on September 10, with orders expanding to the rest of the county the following day. Evacuations along the rest of the Outer Banks and in Brunswick County went in effect on September 11. On September 10, Governor Henry McMaster ordered evacuations for the entire coastline of South Carolina, constituting roughly 1 million people. On September 10, Virginia Governor Ralph Northam ordered mandatory evacuations for low-lying coastal areas in the Hampton Roads and Eastern Shore regions effective September 11, constituting 245,000 people. The US Navy moved 30 ships stationed off the coast of Virginia farther out to sea, to protect the ships and the coastline.

'Red Cross Shelter Serves Florence Evacuees' - News report published by Voice of America on September 14, 2018

In North Carolina, mandatory evacuations were issued on September 11 for Brunswick County, Carteret County, Craven County, Onslow County, Pamlico County, Tyrrell County, North Topsail Beach, Emerald Isle, Ocracoke Island, Atlantic Beach, Indian Beach, Kure Beach, Pine Knoll Shores, and Wrightsville Beach. A mandatory evacuation for visitors and tourists was issued on September 11 for Holden Beach, Oak Island, and Currituck. Voluntary evacuations were issued for Bertie County, Beaufort County, and Surf City. A voluntary evacuation was also issued for New Hanover County on September 10, including Wilmington, NC.

The University of North Carolina at Wilmington issued a mandatory evacuation effective on September 10. All students were evacuated by noon on September 11. The university collaborated with the University of North Carolina at Asheville to house students who had no options for safe shelter. College football games scheduled at North Carolina State University, East Carolina University, Wake Forest University, Appalachian State University, the University of North Carolina at Chapel Hill, and the University of South Carolina were cancelled as a result of the storm. Several universities in North Carolina had announced closings in preparation for the hurricane.

In South Carolina, in 26 eastern counties, public schools were closed until further notice beginning on September 10. State offices in these counties were also ordered closed, while county-level officials could decide when to close their offices.

Atlanta Motor Speedway, Bristol Motor Speedway, Charlotte Motor Speedway and Talladega Superspeedway opened their campgrounds to evacuees of Hurricane Florence free of charge. In West Virginia, Governor Jim Justice ordered for construction along northbound Interstate 77 (West Virginia Turnpike) between the Virginia border in Mercer County and Charleston to be suspended in order to improve traffic flow for evacuees. In addition, West Virginia state parks offered reduced rates for rooms, cabins, and campsites until September 18 in order to provide assistance to evacuees.

== Impact ==
=== Cape Verde and Bermuda ===
Disruptive rainfall and strong winds affected Brava, Fogo, and Santiago in Cape Verde, causing some landslides and localized flooding. Impacts from the storm were otherwise minimal, with no material damage reported.

Large swells and rip currents from the storm reached Bermuda on September 7.

=== United States ===
==== North Carolina ====
Landfall of Hurricane Florence in North Carolina

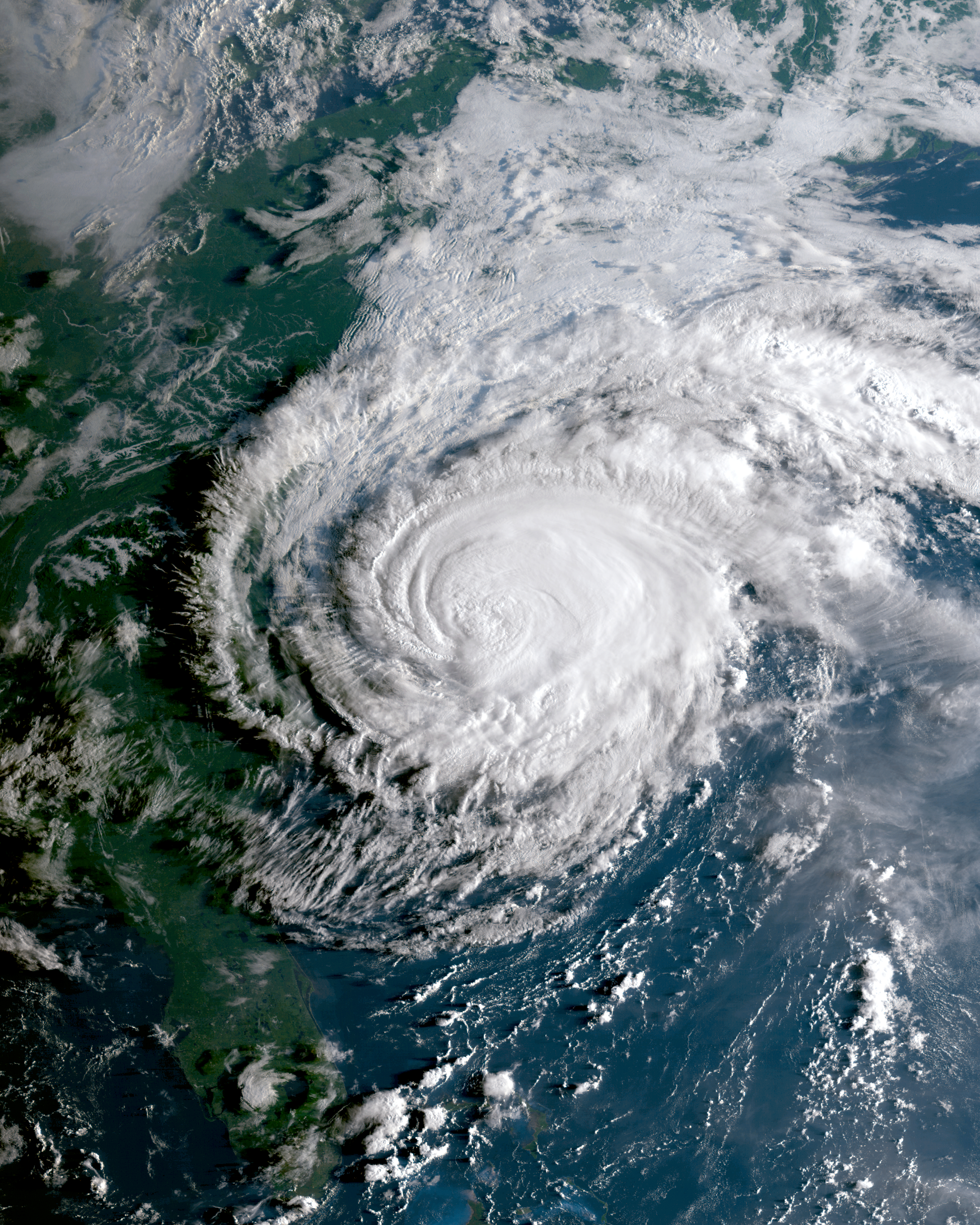
Satellite image based on GOES-16 data 46 minutes after landfall

Animated mosaic of NEXRAD radar imagery of the hurricane

Prior to landfall, an anemometer on Cape Lookout recorded a peak 10-minute sustained wind speed of 83 mph (133 km/h) at around 02:00 UTC on September 14. This was the fastest land-based sustained wind speed measured in connection with Florence, but occurred well north the hurricane's eyewall. Hurricane Florence made landfall near Wrightsville Beach, North Carolina, at roughly 11:15 UTC on September 14. Based on Doppler velocity data retrieved by weather radar, the NHC estimated that the maximum sustained winds associated with the storm were around 90 mph (145 km/h), making Florence a high-end Category 1 hurricane at the time of landfall. The strongest winds accompanying the hurricane during landfall occurred within the northern eyewall but were not directly sampled by any weather station. Farther inland, a peak wind gust of 105 mph (169 km/h) was registered at Wilmington International Airport, though 2-minute sustained winds topped-out at 66 mph (106 km/h). Florence's central air pressure at landfall was around 956 mbar (hPa; 28.23 inHg) based on data from a National Ocean Service observing site in Wrightsville Beach and concurrent aircraft reconnaissance data. The easterly onshore winds produced by Florence pushed a storm surge onto the western shores of Pamlico Sound and the Atlantic-facing coasts of North Carolina. The highest levels of storm surge inundation occurred along the banks of the Neuse River and its tributaries upstream of Pamlico Sound, where USGS sensors and post-storm simulations indicated that the water height reached 8–11 ft (2.4–3.4 m) above typically dry ground. Storm surge inundation ranged from 3–8 ft (0.91–2.44 m) along Onslow Bay and ranged between 2–4 ft (0.61–1.22 m) along the Outer Banks and along the southern North Carolina coast west of Cape Fear.

The slow movement of Florence leading up to and following landfall contributed to the persistence of rainbands over North Carolina between Wilmington and Elizabethtown. The training of rainbands over the same areas led to a swath of rainfall accumulations exceeding 30 in (760 mm), and rainfall totals exceeded 10 in (250 mm) over much of southeastern and south-central North Carolina. A maximum rainfall total of 35.93 in (913 mm) was recorded around 7 mi (11 km) northwest of Elizabethtown, setting a new state record for the highest rainfall accumulation resulting from a tropical cyclone. (Note: The previous record for highest rainfall accumulation from a tropical cyclone in North Carolina was 24.06 in (611 mm), set in Southport during Hurricane Floyd in 1999.) The hurricane also produced 27 tornadoes in North Carolina. Damage statewide reached an estimated US$17 billion, more than the combined damage of Hurricane Floyd and Hurricane Matthew in the state, according to Governor Roy Cooper. Estimated insurance losses ranged between $2.8–5 billion. Hurricane-related flooding damaged an estimated seventy-five thousand structures, many of which had been previously damaged in Hurricane Matthew.

In Wrightsville Beach, North Carolina, 27 people required lifeguard rescue between September 8 and 9. On September 13, New Bern, North Carolina, was inundated with storm surge around 6 feet (1.8 m). Water levels rose in the west side of the Pamlico Sound. Water levels on the Neuse River at Oriental, North Carolina peaked at 9.6 feet above normal. Employees at ABC affiliate WCTI-TV (which serves the surrounding market that includes Greenville and Jacksonville) were forced to evacuate its New Bern studio facility that evening due to the rising waters, with WCTI switching to a simulcast of Sinclair sister station WPDE's live coverage of the storm until station staff could resume their own broadcasts. Reports indicated that around 150 people were in need of rescue in New Bern because of the heavy flooding.

Florence's flooding in North Carolina and Virginia was compounded by earlier flooding during the summer that left the ground heavily saturated.

Florence made landfall in Wrightsville Beach, North Carolina on September 14, and by mid-morning rescuers had already evacuated more than 200 people from floodwaters, with about 150 more awaiting rescue. The storm had reportedly cut power to more than 500,000 customers in North and South Carolina by the time of landfall and caused the roof of a hotel in Jacksonville, North Carolina to collapse that morning. On September 14, about 100 civilians, city workers, and National Guard worked to fill sandbags and protect Lumberton, North Carolina from an identified weak spot that caused massive flooding during Hurricane Matthew in 2016.

Heavy rains continued to affect the Carolinas after landfall. A weather station in Swansboro, North Carolina, recorded 33.90 inches (861 mm) of rain, establishing a new record for a tropical cyclone in that state. By September 17, Florence had dropped a maximum total of 35.93 inches (913 mm) of rain in Elizabethtown, North Carolina, becoming the wettest tropical cyclone recorded in the state.

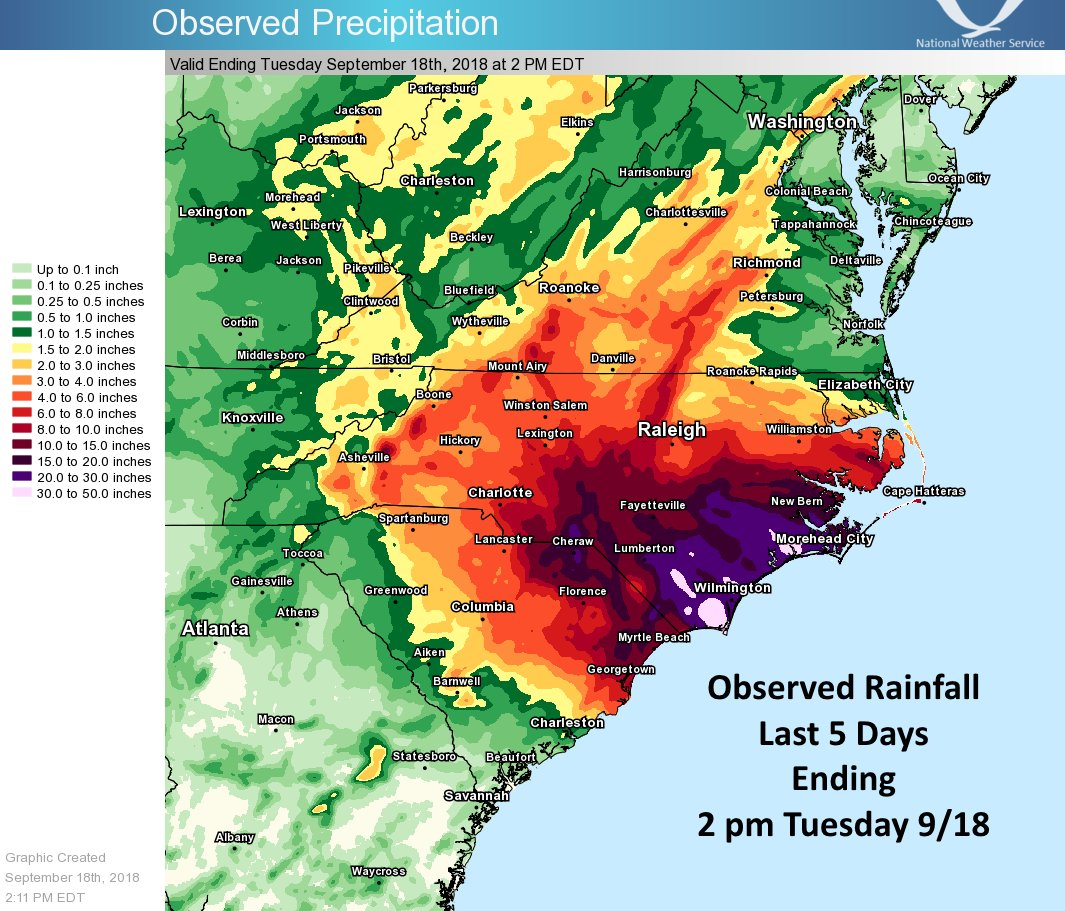
5-day map accumulation with Florence over the Carolinas

Statewide, approximately 2,200 primary and secondary roads closed due to flooding, including large sections of Interstates 40 and 95.

Strong winds in New Hanover County toppled numerous trees and power lines, while more than 90% of the county was left without electricity. The storm dropped up to 27.2 in (690 mm) of rain near Kings Grant. By the morning of September 16, Wilmington had recorded more rain from Florence than any other single weather event in the city's history. Additionally, Florence contributed to the wettest year in Wilmington history, with annual rainfall totals eclipsing the previous record set in 1877. The city of Wilmington became entirely isolated, as all roads to the city flooded and were deemed impassable, and the city's airport and seaport were also closed. Although cell phone service remained operational, excess demand strained networks. More than 450 people required rescue across Wilmington. Woody White, New Hanover County chairman of the board of commissioners, issued a statement advising all travelers to avoid the Wilmington area. There was a report of looting and burglary at a Wilmington area Family Dollar, with the theft of non-essential items such as sports apparel and athletic shoes during the height of the storm. The city-wide curfew issued in advance of the storm was extended because of these incidents.

Early on September 17, a tornado was confirmed in Elm City, North Carolina.

Also on September 17, the Pee Dee River crested at Ansonville at 35.4 ft (10.8 m), 2 ft (0.61 m) above the 1945 record.

The Cape Fear River crested at 61.4 ft (18.7 m)—about 35 ft (11 m) above flood stage—near Fayetteville early on September 19. The magnitude of flooding greatly exceeded the levels observed due to Hurricane Matthew in 2016. The nearby Little River inundated large areas across Cumberland and Harnett counties. Overtopped bridges isolated communities and hampered relief efforts.

==== South Carolina ====
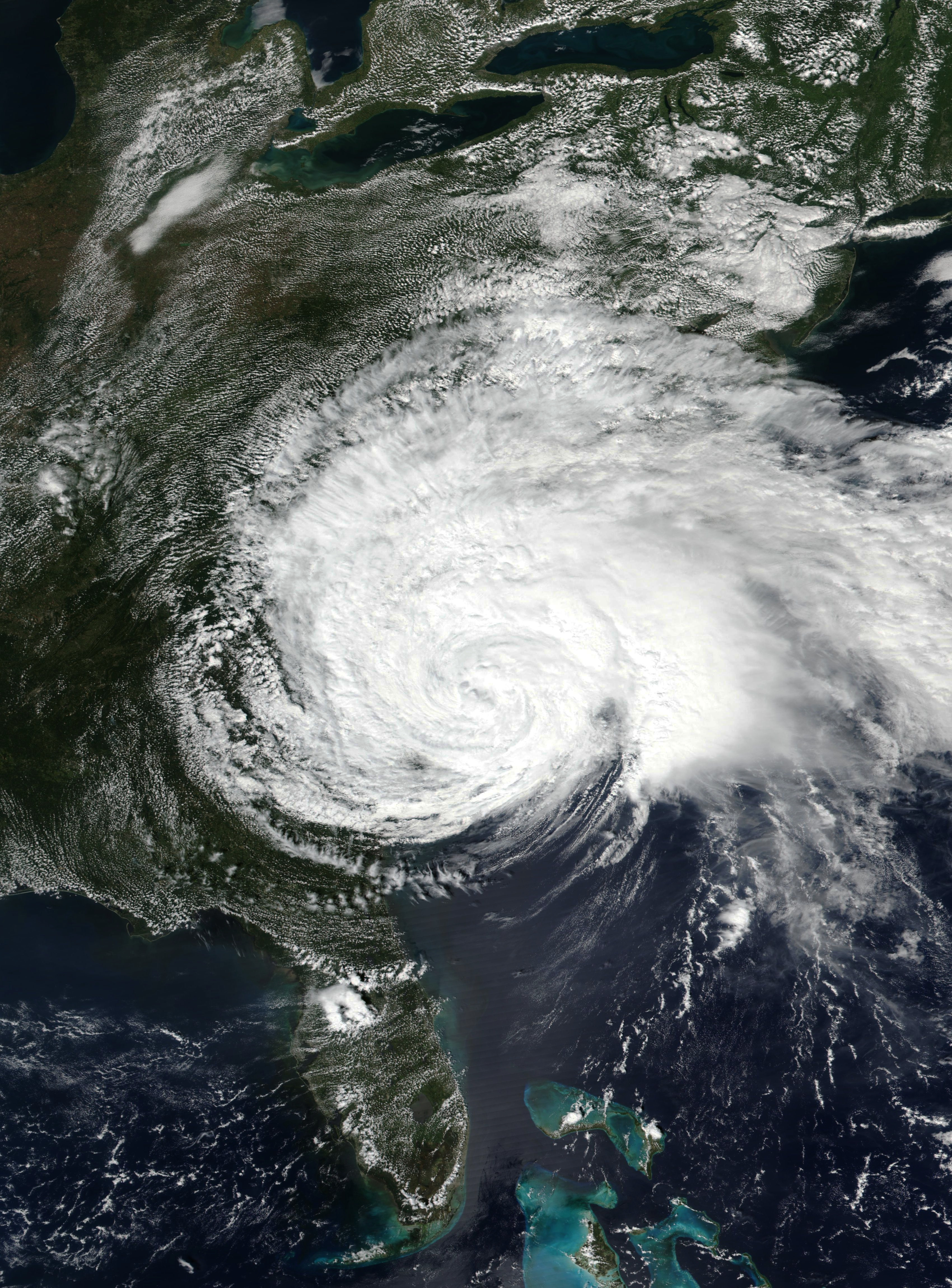
Hurricane Florence about a day after landfall over the Carolinas, on September 15

Heavy rainfall also occurred in South Carolina, with 23.63 in (600 mm) of precipitation observed near Loris, setting a new state record for rainfall from a tropical cyclone. More than 100 people were rescued from their homes and cars in Loris. The Waccamaw River in Conway crested at 22.1 ft (6.7 m) on September 26, exceeding the Hurricane Matthew record of 19.1 ft (5.8 m). At a neighborhood along South Carolina Highway 905, about 5 ft (1.5 m) of water entered some homes. Farther south along the Waccamaw River, homes in a neighborhood in Socastee were flooded with as much as 8 ft (2.4 m) of water. In western Horry County, the community of Dongola was left isolated for 10 days. The overflowing river flooded almost 1,000 homes and businesses. The storm also spawned two tornadoes in Horry County, both rated EF0. The first tornado touched down just north-northeast of Myrtle Beach, causing minor damage to pine trees near Route 17 before lifting after moving only about half a mile. The other tornado touched down near Longs and also damaged pine trees and a roof.

Flooding was also reported in Marion County, especially in Brittons Neck and Gresham. A number of people evacuated and were still not able to access their homes by October 1. In Nichols, flooding damaged about 150 homes which had been rebuilt after Hurricane Matthew. Strong winds downed trees and power lines, while at least one home in Nichols suffered roof damage. Approximately 400 homes in Dillon County were flooded. A total of 21 homes in Darlington County received severe flood damage, while another home was destroyed.

In Chesterfield County, the Pee Dee River crested at 46.51 ft (14.18 m) at Cheraw. Three nearby dams failed, causing significant flooding in Cheraw and the town of Chesterfield. Many roads became impassable or were washed out. A total of 226 homes were damaged and other 2 were destroyed. A Superfund site was also damaged, causing PCB to enter homes, a toxic substance which required cleanup efforts by the Environmental Protection Agency. In Lancaster County, flash flooding left a number of roads impassable and washed out several other streets. A park was flooded after the Gills Creek overflowed. Winds downed about 20 trees in the Lancaster area, one of which fell onto a home and others falling onto a road. Power lines were downed across Route 521, obstructing all four lanes. Damage statewide were at least $1.2 billion.

==== Elsewhere ====
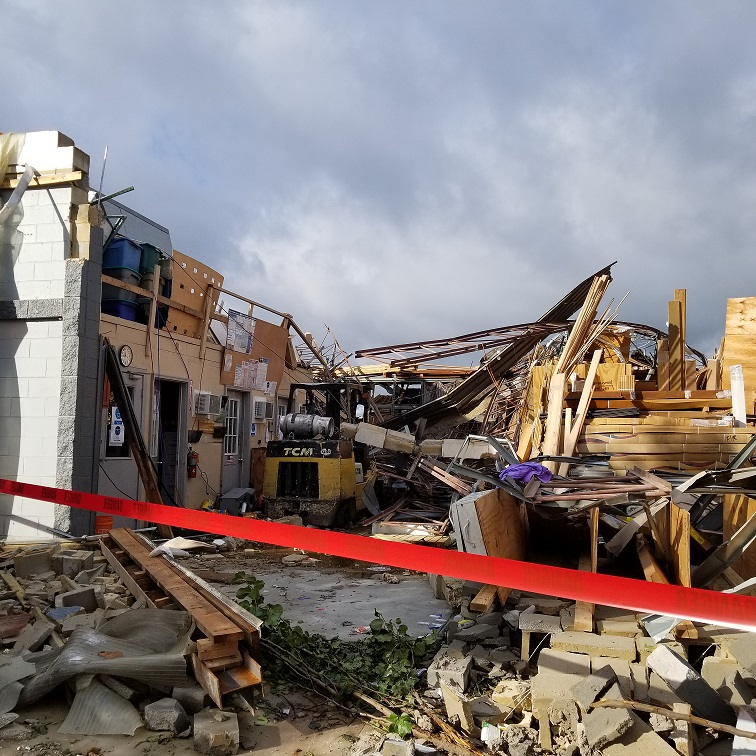
A warehouse in Chesterfield County, Virginia, destroyed by a tornado

The storm spawned 10 tornadoes in Virginia, including 2 in Chesterfield County, 1 in Hanover County, 1 in Mecklenburg County, 1 in Powhatan County, and 5 in Richmond. Most of these tornadoes caused little damage other than downed trees, tree limbs, or electrical poles. However, the twister in Chesterfield County, rated EF2, damaged several buildings between Winterpock and Bon Air and destroyed a warehouse, causing one death and at least one injury. The tornado in Mecklenburg County, rated EF0, touched down between Boydton and Skipwith. Extensive tree damage was reported, with several homes and outbuildings damaged by falling trees. Additionally, Shenandoah National Park was closed due to severe weather. Virginia suffered a total of $200 million in damages.

The state of Georgia experienced lesser amounts of damage, mostly from fallen trees and downed powerlines. Damage in Georgia totaled $30 million.

Large swells ahead of the hurricane reached Assateague State Park, Maryland, by September 9, prompting the Maryland Department of Natural Resources to close beach access indefinitely.

Over 4 in (100 mm) of rain fell in portions of Upstate New York, prompting numerous flood warnings, and closing several roads. In some areas, rainfall rates exceeded 1 in (25 mm) per hour. Farther south, the remnants of Florence produced record rainfall at LaGuardia Airport on September 18, and the New York City Subway system flooded as well. Flash flood damage in New York caused $473,000 in damage.

==== Deaths ====
Deaths by U.S. state
State	Deaths		
State	Direct	Indirect	Total
Florida	2	0	2
North Carolina	15	25	40
South Carolina	4	5	9
Virginia	3	0	3
Total	24	30	54

Rip currents and rough seas in New Smyrna Beach, Florida, caused 13 rescues; one victim died at a hospital and two others had impact injuries. One man drowned on September 11, at Florida's Playalinda Beach, while trying to rescue a 10-year-old boy caught in a rip current. One child drowned in Green Swamp near Sumter, South Carolina, after water released from the Second Mill Pond flowed into the river.

Two people in North Carolina died while trying to evacuate: one in Columbus County and Wayne County. In Wilmington, a mother and her baby were killed when a tree landed on their house. In Hampstead, a woman died of a heart attack; downed trees on roads kept first responders from reaching her. A person was electrocuted in Lenoir County while plugging in a generator in the wet conditions. A house fire in Fayetteville killed a husband and wife. Freshwater flooding killed at least eleven people: one in Anson County, eight Duplin County, and two in Scotland County. One man was killed in Kinston by strong winds while checking on his hunting dogs. A three-month-old baby died in Gaston County when a tree crushed a mobile home. In Union County, a woman drove around a barrier into a flooded road and her vehicle was swept away. Rescuers saved the mother, but her one-year-old baby drowned. An 18-wheeler aquaplaned off Interstate 85 near Kings Mountain and crashed into a tree; the vehicle tore in half, killing the driver. Two other accidents each killed one person: an elderly man died of oxygen loss related to chronic obstructive pulmonary disease during a power outage, and a person collapsed and died in Sampson County while helping an evacuee. One person drowned in the swelling Cape Fear River near Cedar Creek after refusing evacuation orders. On September 20, a man in Brunswick County died after being crushed by a tree he was clearing. In late September, two people were killed in North Carolina while repairing damage from Hurricane Florence to their homes, bringing the death toll in the state to 39.

Three deaths originally attributed to the hurricane were later considered unrelated. One woman died of unknown causes in a shelter, and two people found dead on Harkers Island were deemed victims of a murder-suicide.

Two people died of carbon monoxide poisoning in Loris, South Carolina. A vehicle with three occupants lost control on a flooded road in Georgetown County; one passenger died, while the driver and other passenger escaped. A woman died when her vehicle crashed into a downed tree near Union. A vehicle lost control along Interstate 20 near Columbia and crashed into a bridge support, killing the driver. Another fatal accident occurred near Columbia when a woman drove into a flooded road and crashed into a tree. On September 18, a van was transporting two mental health patients from Horry County to Darlington; the vehicle was swept away by swift-moving water along U.S. Route 76—the swollen Little Pee Dee River was 0.5 mi (0.80 km) from this location. The two deputies in the van managed to escape and survived; however, the two women in the back were shackled and drowned. The deputies were put on administrative leave.

On September 17, ten tornadoes of strengths between EF0 and EF2 touched down in Virginia, resulting in one death in Chesterfield County, Virginia. Another person died when his vehicle was swept away along a flooded road in Louisa.

A 69-year-old man in Robeson County, North Carolina whose house was damaged apparently committed suicide.

==== Agriculture and environmental effects ====
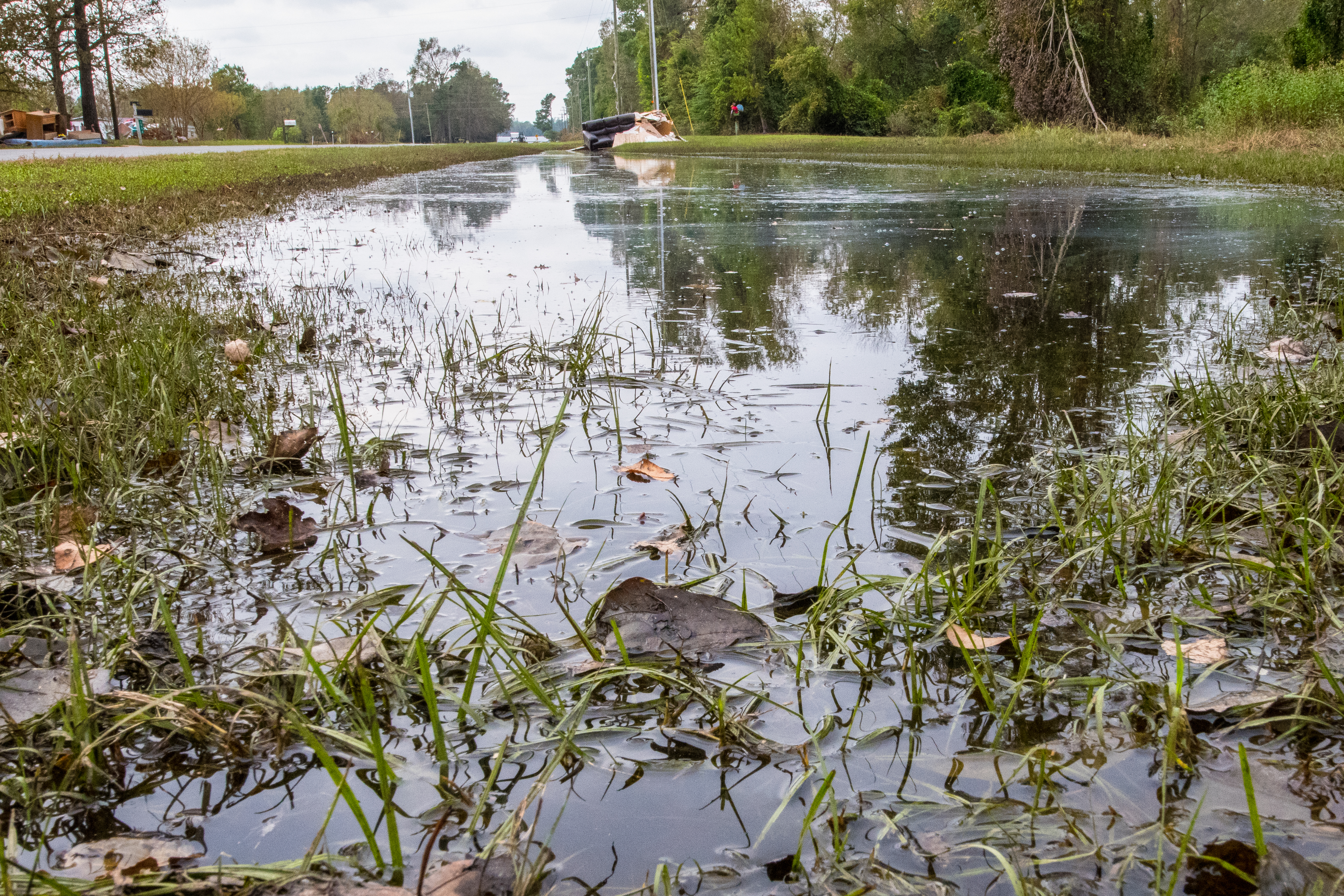
Flooded farmland in Duplin County, North Carolina in the wake of Florence

The large-scale flooding affected swaths of North Carolina's agricultural industry and proved particularly damaging to livestock. Through September 18, the North Carolina Department of Agriculture stated 3.4 million chickens and turkeys and 5,500 hogs died in flooded farms. Dozens of farms remained isolated with animals unable to be fed. Piles of manure stored at these farms were swept into swollen rivers, about a dozen pits holding animal waste were damaged by the flooding and debris.

In total, more than a hundred and thirty hog waste lagoons were compromised, and thirty-three overflowed to the point of discharging their contents into the Cape Fear River watershed. Media coverage of the hurricane drew comparisons with Hurricane Floyd; Smithfield Foods, which owns many of eastern North Carolina's hog farms, had been criticized at the time for allowing the lagoons to overflow, and had promised improvements to prevent future incidents of pollution.

On September 16, approximately 5 million gallons of partially treated wastewater spilled into the Cape Fear River after a treatment plant lost power. An estimated 2,000 yd^{3} (1,530 m^{3}) of coal ash from the closed Sutton Power Station near Wilmington was also swept into the river. Torrential rains from the storm itself, estimated at 30 inches (760 mm), also caused a swamp to spill into the cooling pond. On September 19, the H.F. Lee Energy Complex in Goldsboro flooded to the point where their three ponds were completely underwater and began releasing coal ash into the Neuse River.

==== Domestic and zoo animals ====
During and after the storm made landfall, local rescuers and nationwide donors and organizations worked to aid the many pets that had been left by their owners, or alongside their owners. Others drove to South and North Carolina in order to evacuate animals and bring them outside of the hurricanes impact zone while shelters in other states accepted animals from the states. Many rescuers were looking for local residents in need of assistance or evacuation aid, and discovered some animals in flooding cages, some attempting to seek shelter, and some stranded on porches.

Zoo animals such as those from the Virginia Zoo were sheltered within indoor and sheltered portions of their enclosures. Other zoos such as the North Carolina Zoo were lightly impacted by the storm and opened on September 18, and offered free admission for evacuees from September 18 to 21.

== Aftermath ==
=== Evacuees ===
On September 19, after the rain had stopped, a majority of evacuees were urged by officials to stay away from their homes as the rivers continued to rise; the potential threat of floods remained high, roads remained closed, and thousands lacked power to their homes. Many individuals whose homes were ruined due to the hurricane were offered aid through Red Cross shelters, rental assistance from FEMA, or utilizing undamaged rental properties until their homes are livable. FEMA utilized Transitional Sheltering Assistance Programs to pay for hotel stays for individuals while they look for more permanent solutions, the programs had 342 households and a total of 1,044 people as of October 3.

=== Power restoration ===
In the aftermath of the storm, over 40,000 workers from across the US and Canada went to the Carolinas to help restore power, according to the Edison Electric Institute.

=== Roads ===
The continued flooding closed many major roads for days after the incident. On September 15, NCDOT asked drivers to avoid driving in North Carolina altogether, instructing them to take a detour at Richmond, Virginia using Interstate 64 west to Interstate 81 south into Tennessee to Interstate 40 west to Interstate 75 south into Georgia to Interstate 16 east back to Interstate 95. Parts of I-95 and I-40 in North Carolina reopened ten days later September 23, while hundreds of other roads remained closed. Thousands of dead fish had to be cleaned off of Interstate 40 in Pender County, North Carolina, with other marine life such as a 20-foot-long whale being reported washed onto beaches and residential areas, having to be removed and buried.

=== Relief efforts ===
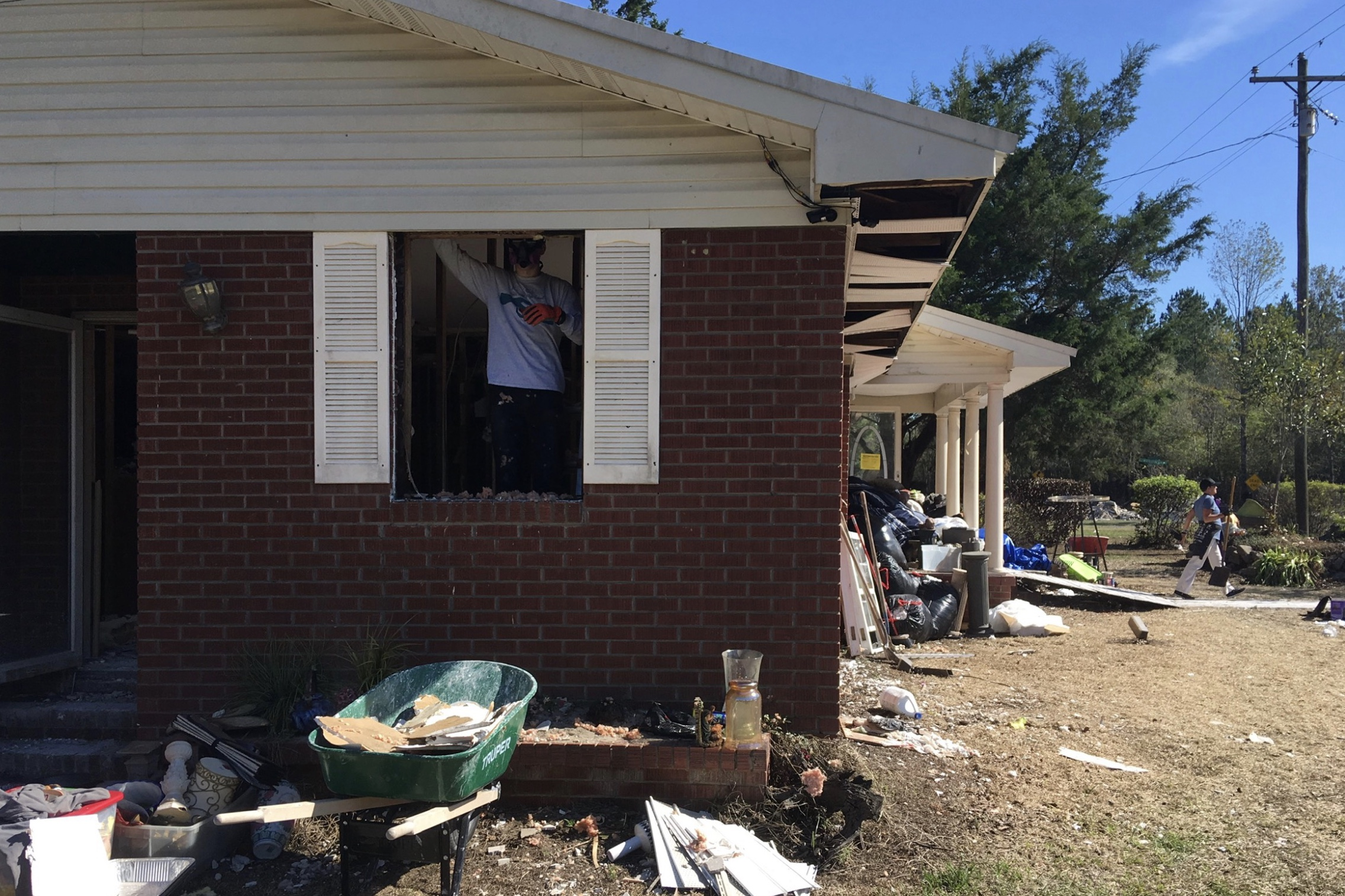
Clean up and volunteering after the storm in Pender County, NC.

President Donald Trump visited North and South Carolina on September 19, and spoke to emergency workers in an airplane hangar at the Marine Corps Air Station Cherry Point. He also promised to provide state officials all support needed for search and rescue operations. Further, he promised to ensure that the states would continue to receive help while they were rebuilding after the storm. South Carolina Governor McMaster applied for $1.2 billion in federal funding for recovery, including $165 million under the National Flood Insurance Program and $125 million for agriculture. On September 23, the United States Congress began to deliberate a $1.7 billion aid package for the Carolinas.

=== Investigation ===
After two patients at a mental hospital died when the van carrying them was swept away by floods, the State Law Enforcement Division and Highway Patrol opened an investigation into the incident, and the deputies involved, who were escorting the women and were rescued from the top of the van, were placed on administrative leave. Family members of the deceased met with South Carolina elected officials to discuss the incident and the changes that they wish to see put in place to prevent other deaths.

=== Connection to climate change ===
A number of studies assessing the effect of global climate change on the impact of Hurricane Florence were performed. Projections prior to landfall made the case that the hurricane could be up to 50% larger and 50 miles wider given the effects of anthropogenic warming. Analyses after the hurricane indicate that warming led to an increase in total rainfall of around 5% and an increase in diameter of around 1.5 miles. When the Associated Press reached out to seventeen meteorologists and climate scientists following the hurricane, the majority agreed that human-caused warming worsened the effects of the storm. However, a few remain hesitant to make such statements regarding individual hurricanes.

=== Retirement ===
Due to the damage and loss of life in the Carolinas from the storm, the name Florence was retired from the Atlantic rotating naming lists by the World Meteorological Organization in March 2019, and will never again be used for an Atlantic basin tropical cyclone. It was replaced with Francine for the 2024 season.

== See also ==
- List of Category 4 Atlantic hurricanes
- Lists of tropical cyclones by area:
  - Bermuda • Florida (2000–present) • Maryland • North Carolina (2000–present)
- 1933 Chesapeake–Potomac hurricane – Category 4 hurricane that took a similar track to Florence as it approached the US, before making landfall near Chesapeake Bay
- Hurricane Hazel (1954) – One of the strongest tropical cyclones to affect the Carolinas
- Hurricane Gracie (1959) – Category 4 hurricane that made landfall in South Carolina
- Hurricane Hugo (1989) – Powerful Cape Verde hurricane that caused widespread destruction in the Carolinas
- Hurricane Fran (1996) – Category 3 hurricane that took a similar track to Florence and affected the Mid-Atlantic
- Hurricane Floyd (1999) – Another storm that caused catastrophic flooding in eastern North Carolina
- Hurricane Isabel (2003) – Took a similar path to Florence late in its lifetime; made landfall in North Carolina as a Category 2 hurricane
- Hurricane Joaquin (2015) – Category 4 hurricane that contributed to historic flooding in the Carolinas, even though the storm itself never made landfall in the Carolinas
- Hurricane Helene (2024) – Category 4 hurricane that caused historic flooding in western North Carolina six years later.
