= New Hope, Wayne County, North Carolina =

New Hope, North Carolina
- Census-designated place
- Location within North Carolina Location within the United States
- Coordinates: 35°22′39″N 77°53′32″W
- Country: United States
- State: North Carolina
- County: Wayne

Area
  - Total: 2.58 sq mi (6.69 km^{2})
  - Land: 2.54 sq mi (6.57 km^{2})
  - Water: 0.046 sq mi (0.12 km^{2})
- Elevation: 131 ft (40 m)

Population (2020)
  - Total: 1,588
  - Density: 626.4/sq mi (241.87/km^{2})
- Time zone: UTC-5 (Eastern (EST))
  - Summer (DST): UTC-4 (EDT)
- ZIP Codes: 27534 (Goldsboro); 28551 (La Grange)
- Area codes: 919 / 984
- FIPS code: 37-46650
- GNIS feature ID: 2806992

New Hope is an unincorporated area and census-designated place (CDP) in Wayne County, North Carolina, United States. It was first listed as a CDP in the 2020 census with a population of 1,588.

The CDP is in eastern Wayne County, bordered to the west by the city of Goldsboro, the county seat. It is bordered to the north by Old Mill Branch and West Bear Creek, which flows east to Bear Creek and then south to the Neuse River. It is bordered to the south by the EC Line of the North Carolina Railroad. The main road through the community is East New Hope Road, which leads west 2 miles (3 km) to U.S. Route 13 in Goldsboro and southeast 3 miles (5 km) to Best. The Goldsboro Bypass (Interstate 42) passes 1 mile (1.6 km) east of New Hope, with access from Exit 364 (Mark Edwards Road).

== Demographics ==
Historical population
Census	Pop.	Note	%±
2020	1,588		—
U.S. Decennial Census; 2020

=== 2020 census ===
New Hope CDP, North Carolina – Demographic Profile (NH = Non-Hispanic)
Race / Ethnicity	Pop 2020	% 2020
White alone (NH)	739	46.54%
Black or African American alone (NH)	528	33.25%
Native American or Alaska Native alone (NH)	11	0.69%
Asian alone (NH)	39	2.46%
Pacific Islander alone (NH)	1	0.06%
Some Other Race alone (NH)	12	0.76%
Mixed Race/Multi-Racial (NH)	77	4.85%
Hispanic or Latino (any race)	181	11.40%
Total	1,588	100.00%

Note: the US Census treats Hispanic/Latino as an ethnic category. This table excludes Latinos from the racial categories and assigns them to a separate category. Hispanics/Latinos can be of any race.
