= Allen Battle =

American baseball player (born 1968)

- Outfielder
- Born: November 29, 1968 (age 56); Grantham, North Carolina, U.S.
- Batted: Right Threw: Right

MLB debut
- April 26, 1995, for the St. Louis Cardinals

Last MLB appearance
- August 14, 1996, for the Oakland Athletics

MLB statistics
- Batting average: .230
- Home runs: 1
- Runs batted in: 7
- Stats at Baseball Reference

Teams
- St. Louis Cardinals (1995); Oakland Athletics (1996)

Allen Zelmo Battle (born November 29, 1968) is an American former professional baseball outfielder. He played in Major League Baseball (MLB) for the St. Louis Cardinals and Oakland Athletics. He was drafted by the Cardinals in the 10th round of the 1991 MLB draft. Battle played his first professional season with their Rookie league Johnson City Cardinals and Class A Savannah Cardinals in 1991, and his last with the Chicago Cubs' Rookie league AZL Cubs and Triple-A Iowa Cubs in 1999.
