= Mount Olive Tribune =

Weekly newspaper in North Carolina, 1904–1922

The Mount Olive Tribune
- Type: Weekly newspaper
- Owner: Restoration Newsmedia
- Founded: 1904
- Ceased publication: June 29, 2022
- Language: English
- Headquarters: 410 NW Center Street, Mount Olive, North Carolina United States
- OCLC number: 13222697
- Website: mountolivetribune.com

The Mount Olive Tribune was a weekly newspaper based in Mount Olive, North Carolina covering Southern Wayne and Northern Duplin Counties. Its final edition was published on June 29, 2022.
