= Nahunta, North Carolina =

Unincorporated community in North Carolina, US

Coordinates: 35°30′29″N 078°03′48″W

Nahunta is a rural unincorporated community in Wayne County, North Carolina, United States, on North Carolina Highway 581.

It is located in the northwestern portion of the county, outside Goldsboro. The community had its own high school (Nahunta High School) until 1961, after which high school students went to the new Charles B. Aycock High School as a part of school consolidation. A private community swimming pool was built in 1973.

The Nahunta Friends Church in the community traces its origins to the 18th century.
