= H.F. Lee Energy Complex =

- Country: United States of America
- Location: Eden
- Coordinates: 35.373595°N 78.088968°W
- Status: Operational
- Commission date: 1951
- Owner: Duke Energy

Thermal power station
- Primary fuel: Natural gas
- Turbine technology: Gas-fired combined cycle
- Cooling source: Neuse River

Power generation
- Nameplate capacity: 920-MW

The H.F. Lee Energy Complex, formerly the Goldsboro Plant, is an electrical power generating complex operated by Duke Energy. The power complex was originally owned by the Carolina Power & Light Company, which inaugurated a coal-fired power plant in 1951. Two more coal plants were added in 1952 and 1962, and then oil-fueled turbines were added in 1967–71. In 2012 these units were shut down and replaced by four gas-fired units. The Quaker Neck Lake was built as a cooling pond for the coal-fired power stations, and is still used to supply cooling water. It was originally impounded by a low dam on the Neuse River, but in 1998 the dam was removed, while the lake remained contained in an earthen wall. This change allowed fish to migrate further upstream for spawning. Ash ponds near the lake hold toxic coal ash. There are plans to remove and recycle or bury the ash.

== Power complex ==
Carolina Power & Light Company's Goldsboro Plant in Wayne County began generating electricity in 1951. A second pulverized coal unit was installed in 1952. A third coal unit, which generated 252-MW, was the first coal-fired facility that was completely controlled by an electronic computer. When the third unit came into operation in 1962 the plant was renamed the H.F. Lee Plant after Harry Fitzhugh Lee, a retired district manager with Carolina Power & Light. Between 1967 and 1971 four oil-fueled combustion turbine units were added.

In August 1999 Carolina Power and Light Company agreed to buy the Florida Progress Corporation. The merger was complete in 2000, and the combined company was called Progress Energy. In 2009 the company announced that the coal-fired units and combustion turbines at the H.F. Lee Plant would be retired. Progress Energy merged with Duke Energy in July 2012. The three coal-fired units were shut down on 15 September 2012, and the four oil-fueled combustion turbine units ceased operation in October 2012. Wayne County combustion turbines continued to operate at the complex. A new 920-MW gas-fired combined cycle plant began operation in December 2012. The Lee Combined Cycle Plant uses the Quaker Neck Lake as its water source. It has three 180 MW turbines and one 380 MW turbine.

== Quaker Neck Lake cooling pond ==
Quaker Neck Lake is 4.7 miles (7.6 km) west of the city center of Goldsboro, North Carolina. It is at 35.3732°N 78.0756°W, at an elevation of 18 metres (59 ft). The lake was made as a cooling pond for the power plant, one of about 48 man-made ponds and lakes in the Neuse River basin. The power complex is to the west of the lake. The lake today lies within a hairpin bend of the Neuse River, but is separated from the river. The river flows eastward along the north of the lake, turns south, then southwest, then runs westward along the south shore of the lake, before turning south and then resuming its generally eastward flow.

The 545 acres (221 ha) cooling pond is contained in an earthen wall, and is used to supply cooling water to the power plants. Hurricane Matthew dropped 15 inches (380 mm) of rain in the area in October 2016, which caused the Neuse River to flood. On 12 October 2016 Duke Energy announced that a break 50 to 60 feet (15 to 18 m) wide had developed in the southeast corner of the cooling pond wall. The break was expected to have little impact on the flooded river.

== Quaker Neck Dam ==
The low-head Quaker Neck Dam was built in 1952 at Neuse River kilometer 225 to impound cooling water for the steam electric plant. A fish ladder was included. The Dam was 7 feet (2.1 m) high and 260 feet (79 m) long. The dam rose only about 1 metre (3 ft 3 in) above the water during average flow conditions, and was completely submerged in high flow periods. Some studies found that the dam had little impact on fish, which had no difficulty in using the ladder or in crossing the dam in high water periods. Most studies found that only a few fish were able to pass the dam. The dam was classified as a barrier to fish in 1989 by the United States Fish and Wildlife Service. There were delays while the Carolina Power & Light Company looked for an alternative source of cooling water. An alternative was developed between 1993 and 1996, and it was agreed to remove the dam.

Deconstruction was undertaken between December 1997 and August 1998. Bruce Babbitt, Secretary of the Interior, swung a sledgehammer to symbolically start removal of the Menominee, Quaker Neck & Cherry Hospital Dams. The Quaker Neck Dam was removed in May 1998. The work cost $222,000. The result was to restore access for anadromous fish to about 78 miles (126 km) of the Neuse River and 925 miles (1,489 km) of tributary streams. Anadromous fish mainly live in saltwater, but return to freshwater to spawn, and include alewife (Alosapseudoharengus), blueback herring (Alosa aestivalis), striped bass (Morone saxatilis) and American shad (Alosa sapidissima). The Cherry Hospital Dam was also removed, which restored another 76 miles (122 km) of streams for use by anadromous fish in Little River, a Neuse tributary.

In a 1999 study American shad were equipped with transmitters so their movement could be observed. Of 11 American shad whose transmitters provided useful data, 9 migrated upstream past the former dam site, but all halted within 16 river kilometers of the former dam, long before reaching the next obstacle. However, a comparison of data collected in the 1970s and in 2003–04 show that American shad, hickory shad and striped bass spawning distribution expanded considerably after the dam was removed.

== Ash basins ==
There are four coal-ash basins at the H.F. Lee Steam Plant. An active ash pond enclosed in a dyke lies opposite Quaker Neck Lake to the north of the river. There are three inactive ash basins to the west of the river further upstream. These are forested, do not impound water and are normally dry. The basins hold coal ash in a layer 4 to 10 feet (1.2 to 3.0 m) thick over an area of 170 acres (69 ha). A Duke Energy site assessment in 2015 reported that the basins had high levels of toxic heavy metals such as arsenic, antimony and thallium.

The flooded river in October 2016 flowed over the three inactive ash basins. The company said there was no risk of significant release of material from these basins, and the active ash pond was not affected by the flooding. However, in October 2016 Waterkeeper Alliance and Sound Rivers reported a large coal ash spill from at least one of the inactive basins. The basins had been underwater for over a week. One observer said "This spill is easily visible to anyone in a boat. The area looks like a winter wonderland of toxic coal ash as it has coated the water and trees." According to the Southern Alliance for Clean Energy, the spill was "yet another tragic example of why coal ash must be excavated from pits near waterways and stored in lined, dry impoundments away from rivers and well above the water table, as soon as possible."

In December 2016 Duke Energy said that in compliance with the Coal Ash Management Act the company would recycle ash from the ponds for use in manufacturing concrete, aiming to excavate all the material by 2028. Any ash that could not be recycled would be buried at a lined landfill. Originally the company had planned to move the six million tons of coal ash to a landfill in Lee County. Duke Energy was now going to invest in technology to remove excess carbon to make the ash more suitable for concrete.

== Sources ==
- Bowman, Stephan W. (15 March 2001), American Shad and Striped Bass Spawning Migration and Habitat Selection in the Neuse River, North Carolina (PDF), NCSU
- "Carolina Power Acquiring Florida Progress", New York Times, 23 August 1999
- Chastain, John (23 July 2012), MONITORING WELL LOCATION MAP : ACTIVE ASH POND : OCTOBER 2012 (PDF), Progress Energy
- Dam Removal Costs, CRMC: Coastal Resources Management Council Narragansett Bay Estuary Program, archived from the original on 2018-06-29
- Downey, John (13 December 2016), "Duke Energy to recycle coal ash from shuttered Goldsboro plant", Charlotte Business Journal
- Duke Energy (16 October 2016), "Cooling pond at Duke Energy's H.F. Lee Plant breaks; minimal river impact expected", prnewswire
- Editors of Power Engineering (22 December 2016), "In Shift, Duke Energy to Recycle Coal Ash at H.F. Lee Plant", Power Engineering
- Ferreri, C. Paola (1 April 2011), EVALUATING BIOLOGICAL EFFECTS OF DAM REMOVALS IN PENNSYLVANIA (PDF), Pennsylvania State University, archived from the original (PDF) on September 19, 2015
- Gleick, Peter H. (2000), The World's Water 2000-2001: The Biennial Report On Freshwater Resources, Island Press, ISBN 978-1-59726-284-2
- H.F. Lee Plant, Duke Energy
- Harned, Douglas A. (1982), "Water Quality of the Neuse River, North Carolina - Variability, pollution loads, and long-term trends", U.S. Geological Survey Water-supply Paper, U.S. Government Printing Office
- Homegrown Raleigh Powerhouse, CP&L, North Carolina Department of Natural and Cultural Resources
- "Lakes Near Goldsboro, North Carolina", GeoStat.org
- Larson, Aaron (19 October 2016), "H.F. Lee Coal Ash Spill Puts Duke Energy Under the Spotlight Again", Power
- "Lee Combined Cycle Plant", Energy Justice Network
- Morris, Albert L. (1992), A History of Carolina Power and Light Company 1958 – 1992 (PDF), CP&L
- Quaker Neck and Cherry Hospital Dam Removal, U.S. Fish and Wildlife Service, 5 July 2016
- "Quaker Neck Lake Dam", Mapcarta
- Wald, Matthew L. (3 July 2012), "Duke and Progress Energy Become Largest U.S. Utility", New York Times
- Waterkeeper Alliance (12 October 2016), Waterkeeper Alliance and Upper Neuse Riverkeeper Respond to Duke Energy Cooling Pond Dam Breach of Quaker Neck Lake, archived from the original on 2018-06-23
- Waterkeeper Alliance (19 October 2016b), "Coal Ash Continues to Spill Into River, Where Is Duke Energy?", EcoWatch
- Wildman, Laura (23 June 2015), The Evolution of Pro-Active Dam Removal in the US Over the Last Quarter Century (Presentation at the International Conference on Engineering and Ecohydrology for Fish Passage), University of Massachusetts - Amherst
