= Rosewood High School =

American public school in North Carolina

Location
- 900 Rosewood Rd; Goldsboro, North Carolina 27530; United States; 35°24′57″N 78°04′31″W

Information
- School type: Public
- CEEB code: 341530
- Principal: Andrew Lassiter Jr.
- Teaching staff: 30.57 (FTE)
- Grades: 9–12
- Enrollment: 447 (2023-2024)
- Student to teacher ratio: 14.62
- Education system: Wayne County Public Schools
- Colors: Purple and gold
- Athletics conference: Swine Valley 2A/3A Conference
- Mascot: Eagle
- Yearbook: Roseagle
- Website: www.waynecountyschools.org/o/rhs

Rosewood High School is a public high school for grades 9–12, located in Rosewood near Goldsboro, North Carolina.

Part of the Wayne County School System, the school operates on a block (4X4) schedule with four classes taken each semester. Rosewood currently employs 66 staff members for approximately 600 students.

== History ==
The original 1905 Rosewood School

The first "Rosewood" school was constructed in 1905, at the site of the present day Eagle's Nest and surrounding shopping center. This building, a joint venture between Pine Forest and Applejack, became the first consolidated school in Wayne County. An account from some alumni states that "In winter the school was heated by a pot-bellied wood-stove. Every morning the boys would go out and cut wood; but when it was warmer and spring began, the teen-age 'hangout' was the old pump-house." Three students graduated from the school that year.

Although this school building was the first to cater to the entire Fork Township area, the students residing in the township at one point attended small schools, which eventually consolidated to form the original Rosewood School. The oldest of these schools, Pine Forest schoolhouse (originally Fate Sasser schoolhouse), was established in 1860, and was situated near the site of the present-day Pine Forest church. Ebenezer schoolhouse was erected at about the same time as the Pine Forest school. It was named for the Ebenezer church, which was built around 1810, and lives on to this day. In 1884 or 1885, Pearson House and Spring Hill, two smaller schools, consolidated to form the Applejack schoolhouse. Applejack schoolhouse, named for the crab apple and Black Jack oak trees that dwelled in the school's vicinity, was located approximately two miles from the present school. While only being a one-room schoolhouse, this school was still able to educate pupils on various topics such as second year Latin, the traditional "Blue back" speller, and even Christianity when it served as a Sunday school building for one year in 1890. Antioch school, founded between 1885 and 1890, stood about five miles southwest of the current Rosewood school. Oakland school, established circa 1890, was located approximately four miles west of the present school. Its name came from the "oak grove" in which it stood.

Out of these five smaller schools, Pine Forest and Applejack consolidated in 1904 to form the first "Rosewood" school by 1905. The committeemen decided on the name Rosewood because of its relative location to Rose station.

The main building, which is still in use to this day, opened in the spring of 1923. It was constructed in 1922–1923 at a cost of $50,000 (equivalent to $600,000 by today's standards). That year there were three full-time teachers, seven elementary teachers, a part-time physical education director, and one athletic coach. A total of 221 pupils were enrolled in the "new" school that year. The school was equipped with steam heat (which is still used to this day), electric lights, and running water. This 11-grade school also had an agricultural department. In addition, the 1922–23 Rosewood school also had baseball, basketball, tennis, and track teams.

Shortly after the construction of this building, both Antioch and Oakland consolidated with Rosewood, thereby increasing its enrollment to an estimated 360 pupils, with 12 teachers in all.

In 1927, the right side of the school building was added on to with four new rooms and a new stairway. This addition was ready for use in the 1928–29 school year.

In 1950, Wayne County undertook a project to construct gyms at schools throughout the county. Gyms were being built at the schools of Nahunta, Pikeville, Eureka, and Rosewood. The construction of the Rosewood gym was completed in 1951. The principal during construction, Mr. Larry Deans, was unwilling to settle for a gym equivalent in size to the ones under construction at Rosewood's cross-county counterparts. Therefore, he enacted fund raisers to raise enough money to build the larger size gym, which is still present to this day. Fund raising efforts included bringing home-grown corn to school to sell and making sandwiches to sell. In addition, donations came in from throughout the community to aid in the fund raising for the gym.

The Wayne Collection, a book featuring literary and artistic works from students in Wayne County Schools, was first published in 1986. Since that time, hundreds of Rosewood students have had their works published in the annual book. Rosewood's first annual or yearbook was published in 1970 under the name "Roseagle."

== Facilities ==
In-district students attending Rosewood High School come directly from Rosewood Middle School, and prior to that, Rosewood Elementary. The construction of the high school was completed in 1984, and has housed the graduating classes ever since. The elementary school was established recently, with the residing grades of K–5, whereas before, the elementary school building (currently the middle school) housed K–6, and the high school consisted of grades 7–12.

== Athletics ==
The boys' track distance core team leaving the starting line to begin the 3200 m run (2007)

Rosewood High School is a member of the North Carolina High School Athletic Association and are classified as a 2A school. The school competes in the Swine Valley 2A/3A Conference. Rosewood fields athletic teams in 18 sports including: football, tennis, cross country, soccer, wrestling, track, golf, basketball, baseball, cheerleading, and softball among others.

== Notable alumni ==
- Stephen Rhodes, former NASCAR Craftsman Truck Series racing driver
- David Simmons, former NFL linebacker, played collegiately at North Carolina
