= Grantham, North Carolina =

Unincorporated community

Coordinates: 35°17′50″N 78°09′49″W

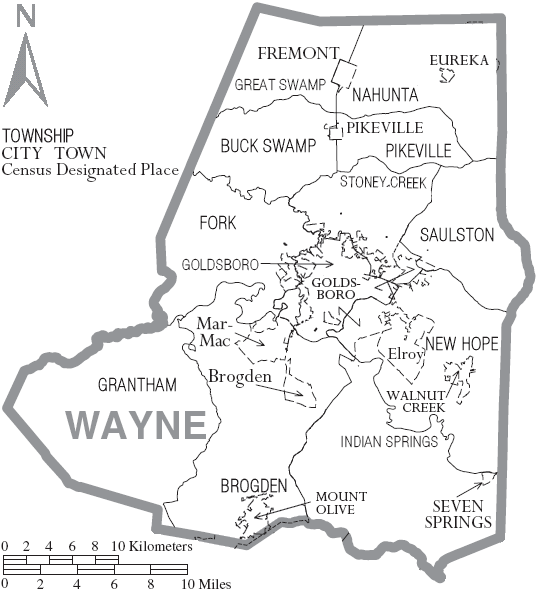
Map of Wayne County, with municipal and township labels

Grantham is an unincorporated community in southwestern Wayne County, North Carolina, United States. Located southwest of the county seat, Goldsboro, it is located on U.S. Route 13 between Goldsboro and Newton Grove to the south.

Grantham has an elementary school for k-5 and a middle school for 6-8. The mascot is the Bulldogs, and the colors are green and white. There was formerly a Grantham High School, but it no longer exists. Grantham is one of three feeder schools to Southern Wayne High School in nearby Dudley. Grantham Middle School was completed for the 2015–2016 school year.

In addition to the Grantham family settling the area originally, other families included Skinner, Pipkin, Bizzell, Hood, Cox, Herring, Casey, Bradshaw, Jernigan, Kelly, Cogdell, Perkins, Stevens, Warrick, Laws, Parker, Kennedy, Whitfield, Britt, Sutton, Blackman, Rose, Sasser, Brown, McCullen, Mozingo, Ingram, Thornton, Keen, Jordan, Jinnette, Best, Porter, Denning, and Williams.

== Notable people ==
- Allen Battle, MLB player
