= Wayne County Public Schools =

School district in North Carolina, United States

The Wayne County Public School System is the 20th largest in the state of North Carolina out of 115 school systems.

== Public schools ==
=== High schools ===
- Charles B. Aycock High School, Pikeville
- Eastern Wayne High School, Goldsboro
- Goldsboro High School, Goldsboro
- Rosewood High School, Goldsboro
- Southern Wayne High School, Dudley
- Spring Creek High School, Seven Springs
- Wayne Early/Middle College High School, Goldsboro
- Wayne Middle/High Academy, Goldsboro
- Wayne School of Engineering (6–12), Goldsboro

=== Middle schools ===
- Brogden Middle (5–8)
- Dillard Middle (6–8)
- Eastern Wayne Middle (6–8)
- Grantham Middle (5-8)
- Mount Olive Middle (5–8)
- Norwayne Middle (6–8)
- Rosewood Middle (6–8)
- Spring Creek Middle (5-8)
- Greenwood Middle (5–8)
- Wayne School of Engineering (6–12)

=== Elementary schools ===
- Brogden Primary (K–4)
- Carver Elementary (K–4)
- Carver Heights Elementary (K–5)
- Fremont STARS (K–5)
- Eastern Wayne Elementary (K–5)
- Grantham School (K–4)
- Meadow Lane Elementary (K–4)
- North Drive Elementary (K–2)
- Northeast Elementary (K–5)
- Northwest Elementary (K–5)
- Rosewood Elementary (K–5)
- School Street Elementary (Pre-K only)
- Spring Creek Elementary (K–4)
- Tommy's Road Elementary (K–5)

=== Other Schools ===
- Belfast Academy
- Edgewood Community Developmental School
- Southern Academy
- Wayne School of Technical Arts (grade 6-11)
