= Wayne School of Engineering =

American public school in North Carolina

Location
- 801 N. Lionel St. Goldsboro, North Carolina 27530; United States
- Coordinates: 35°23′10″N 77°58′48″W

Information
- School type: Public
- CEEB code: 341534
- Principal: Carol Watson
- Staff: 29.72 (FTE)
- Grades: 6–13
- Enrollment: 488 (2021–22)
- Student to teacher ratio: 17.49
- Colors: Columbia blue, black, silver
- Mascot: Titans
- Website: www.waynecountyschools.org/o/wse

Wayne School of Engineering is a high school in Goldsboro, North Carolina, USA. The school currently serves grades 6–13. Wayne School of Engineering selects students through an application process which all rising 6th graders in Wayne County are eligible for. The school opened August 8, 2007.

== Curriculum ==
Wayne School of Engineering's curriculum is based on collaboration, self-management, and relevance. In addition to a high school diploma, students have the opportunity to complete an associate degree through Wayne Community College.

The school recently moved to a new location so that it may serve more Wayne County students. As WSE expands, more curriculum options may become available to both middle school and high school students. For a list of the most current course offerings, visit the website.
