= Charles B. Aycock High School =

American public school in North Carolina

Location
- 5460 US-117 N Pikeville, North Carolina 27863; United States; 35°30′33″N 77°58′49″W

Information
- School type: Public
- Founded: 1961 (65 years ago)
- School district: Wayne County Public Schools
- Superintendent: Michael Dunsmore
- CEEB code: 343065
- Principal: Mr. Nelson Cunningham
- Staff: 63.33 (FTE)
- Grades: 9–12
- Enrollment: 1,125 (2023–2024)
- Student to teacher ratio: 17.76
- Colors: Light blue, gold, and white
- Team name: Golden Falcons
- Website: www.waynecountyschools.org/o/charlesbaycockhigh

Charles B. Aycock High School (CBA) is a public high school in Wayne County, North Carolina, United States, that opened in 1961. The school's physical address is Pikeville, North Carolina.

== Naming ==
The school is named after the 50th governor of North Carolina, Charles Brantley Aycock (1859–1912), who was also born near where the school stands. During Governor Aycock's term, he advocated improving North Carolina's public schools. Even after his term as governor, he continued to work on the improvement of schools in the country.

== Description ==
=== Colors and mascot ===
The school colors are Carolina blue, gold, and white. The mascot for all school sponsored sports teams is the Golden Falcon.

=== Students accepted ===
Charles B. Aycock is a public high school, so anyone residing within the school district is eligible to go to the school. Students typically enter this high school from Norwayne Middle School. The school offers classes for grades 9 through 12.

=== Population ===
The school's enrollment is just above 1,300 students, and the number of students enrolled is growing continually each year. Each of the four grades taught in the high school has approximately 300 students. The school's population continues to increase because the area has recently seen a growth in population. The recent growth spurt in the area has put an obvious strain on the school. To accommodate for the very large student population, Charles B. Aycock added a new two story wing to the school, which allowed space for many new classrooms including a chemistry lab, engineering classroom, and an art room among many others.

=== Improvements ===
The county has approved twenty-two million dollars for construction and renovation of schools within Wayne County. This money will be divided among the schools with the most need. Also, the Wayne County School Board is addressing the highest drop-out rate in the county here at CBA.

== Activities ==
=== Academics ===
There are several nationally credited teachers on staff at CBA. Each of the award-winning department heads is highly requested and brings in high test grades.

=== Sports ===
Sports offered include: cheerleading, football, golf, soccer, tennis, wrestling, baseball, volleyball, cross country, track and field, and swimming. Most teams require the student to: try out, go to all practices, and maintain acceptable grades in all classes.

The coaches of Charles B. Aycock sports are selective in their team members. A high level of athletic ability is called for in most of the school's sports teams.

=== Clubs ===
Charles B. Aycock High School offers several student clubs. Most clubs are run and operated by students. However, a supervising teacher with some knowledge of the field is required to attend all club meetings. The school offers these clubs: JROTC, Art Club, FFA, DECA, FBLA, FCCLA, Photography Club, Model UN, HOSA, Key Club, FCA, Aycock Youth Council (AYC) along with clubs for interest in Religion, Math, Science, History, English, and Foreign Language.

=== Band ===
Charles B. Aycock High School offers a class for students interested in playing instruments. Interested students have the option to participate in the jazz band, marching band, or concert band. There is a summer camp offered for band members.

=== Theatre ===
Charles B. Aycock High School offers Beginning to Advanced Theatre. Drama club also offers students an opportunity to perform out of the classroom with a minimum of two productions throughout the school year. The theatre program, along with band and vocals, is being rebuilt through the efforts of excellent band and theatre teachers.

== Services ==
The school offers counseling services. Students can make an appointment with a counselor for assistance with anything from school troubles to home life. The school offers: a nurse, a psychologist, a social worker, and three school counselors. The counselors offer help with signing up for SATs. They can write letters of recommendation, offer help with signing up for classes, and help students find financial aid.
