= Rosewood, North Carolina =

Unincorporated community in North Carolina, US

Coordinates: 35°24′49″N 078°04′15″W

Rosewood is an unincorporated community in Wayne County, North Carolina, United States on the west side of Goldsboro, located at the intersection of NC 581 and Rosewood Road 1 mile south of U.S. Route 70.

The community contains an elementary(k-5), middle(6-8), and high(9-12) school. Rosewood Middle is at the intersection of Rosewood Road and NC 581 S. in the original Rosewood School building. Rosewood High School is adjacent to the middle school on Rosewood Road. The elementary school is on the corner of Rosewood Road and Charlie Braswell Road.

The community operates two volunteer fire departments, Rosewood and Oakland. There are several churches of various denominations within Rosewood including Rosewood First Baptist, Rosewood Church of God, Pine Forest Global Methodist Church, Barnes Chapel Church, Westwood United Methodist Church, and Oakland Community Church.

In recent years the city of Goldsboro has satellite annexed areas nearby the community in order for several stores to move into the area. The main industry is still farming including hog and chicken houses as well as tobacco, corn, sweet potato, strawberry, cotton, and soybean farming.

The main highway near Rosewood is U.S. Route 70, just to the north.
