= Little River (Neuse River tributary) =

River in North Carolina, United States

Coordinates: 35°22′36″N 78°01′30″W

The Little River is a tributary of the Neuse River, which originates in Moore's Pond, south of Youngsville in Franklin County, North Carolina, US.

The river crosses through Wake, Johnston and Wayne counties, joining the Neuse at Waynesborough State Park and Busco Beach just east of Goldsboro. Wake County and the City of Raleigh have been purchasing land in the watershed in order to create a reservoir in northeast Wake County.

== See also ==
- List of rivers of North Carolina
