= Wayne Community College =

College in Goldsboro, North Carolina, U.S.

Coordinates: 35.4029178°N 77.9445951°W

- Motto: Labor Omnia Vincit
- Motto in English: Labor Conquers All Things
- Type: Public community college
- Established: 1958
- Parent institution: North Carolina Community College System
- President: Patty Pfeiffer
- Location: Goldsboro, North Carolina, United States
- Colors: Blue and Gold
- Mascot: Bison
- Website: www.waynecc.edu

Wayne Community College is a public community college in Goldsboro, North Carolina. It offers more than 70 credit programs on campus with nine buildings and over 287,000 square feet (27,000 m^{2}). Over 14,000 curriculum and extension students are enrolled at the college per year. The college is part of the North Carolina Community College System.

== History ==
Wayne Community College began as the Goldsboro Industrial Education Center (I.E.C.), established on April 3, 1958. The original on-campus building was completed in November 1960, and until Fall 1962 all courses were taught in the evening, and all students were part-time.

In the 1962–63 school year, the first full-time courses were offered leading to diplomas in automotive mechanics, electronics, drafting, and practical nursing. At that time, Goldsboro I.E.C. had 47 students enrolled with eight faculty members. From 1963 through 1965, three extension units of Goldsboro I.E.C. were established in Morehead City, Kenansville, and Clinton, which later became Carteret Community College, James Sprunt Community College, and Sampson Community College.

In January 1964, Goldsboro I.E.C. became Wayne Technical Institute. By Fall 1966, the enrollment had increased to approximately 550 curriculum students and more than 1500 extension students. During the late 1960s, several additional classroom buildings were added to the campus.

In November 1967, a community vote approved the necessary financial support, and Wayne Technical Institute became Wayne Community College. By the fall of 1968, enrollment had risen to nearly 700 curriculum students. Since 1968, the enrollment of Wayne Community College has steadily grown each year.

In January 1974, the campus relocated from the U.S. 70 bypass to Wayne Memorial Drive due to the rapid student population growth.

The 1997-1998 college year marked the 40th Anniversary of Wayne Community College, celebrated with the theme "Forty and Proud!" The college's rapid growth has paralleled that of the North Carolina Community College System, which is one of the largest in the United States.

Notable Wayne Community College graduates include psychologist Russell Barkley (June 1972).

Wayne Early Middle College High School is located on the campus of Wayne Community College. It accepted 60 students into the first freshman class in August, 2007.

=== 2015 shooting ===
On April 13, 2015, 20-year old Kenneth Stancil, a recently ousted student, walked onto campus with a shotgun, entered the print shop near the library, and fatally shot the print shop operator, with whom he had been performing work-study duties until dismissed in March. On April 14, 2015, the shooter was arrested in Daytona Beach, Florida and extradited to North Carolina. Stancil was sentenced to life without parole and is incarcerated in the Eastern Correctional Institution in North Carolina.
