= Katharine Banham =

English clinical psychologist

Katharine May Banham (May 26, 1897, in Sheffield, England – May 7, 1995, in Buckinghamshire, England) was an English psychologist who specialized in developmental psychology. She was the first woman to be awarded a Ph.D. from the Université de Montréal.

== Early life and education ==
Katharine May Banham received a B.S. from the University of Manchester in 1919 and a M.S. from Cambridge University in 1921. In 1923, she earned a M.A. from the University of Toronto and graduated cum laude from the Université de Montréal in 1934, being the first woman to be awarded a Ph.D. from that university.

== Career ==
Banham's held her first position as a lecturer at the University of Toronto in 1921, where she was the only female faculty member in both the psychology and philosophy departments. After leaving the University of Toronto, she held a number of professional and faculty positions in England, Canada, and the United States.

=== North Carolina ===
In 1950, Banham was appointed as the Senior Psychologist at the North Carolina Board of Public Welfare, now the North Carolina Division of Social Services. Banham became the Head Psychologist of the infant program at the North Carolina Cerebral Palsy Hospital (now the Lenox Baker Children's Hospital) in 1967 and, in 1980, the Consulting Psychologist.

In Durham, North Carolina, Banham helped to establish many organizations related to her work in the field of psychology. She was the first clinical psychologist for the Child Guidance Clinic of Durham, which was established in 1947 and continues to operate as of 2015. Banham was also involved with the creation of the Committee for Successful Aging which evolved into the Durham Center for Senior life, an active non-profit as of 2015.

Banham was one of the founding members of the North Carolina Psychological Association in 1948, an affiliate of the American Psychological Association. She also supported the burgeoning Durham chapter of the Altrusa Club, an all-women organization devoted to serving one's community, as well as the French Club of Durham and Photographic Arts Society of Durham.

==== Duke University ====
In 1946, Banham was appointed as an associate professor in the Duke University psychology department, where she became associate professor of psychology, emerita in 1967. She was integral to the creation of infant and child development courses in the department.

Banham co-founded the Duke University Nursery School with Dr. Wally Reichenberg-Hackett in 1946 to further the cause of establishing a developmental psychology program at Duke. She also helped to establish the Duke Film Society and the Duke Institute for Learning in Retirement. While serving on faculty committees, she additionally developed a program for counseling first-year students at the university.

In 1985, she established the financial endowment for the Anne McDougall Memorial Award to provide opportunities for women at Duke to study psychology that may not have had such opportunities previously.
