= Black American Sign Language =

Dialect of American Sign Language

- Fingerspelling of "BASL"
- Native to: United States
- Region: North America
- Language family: Francosign: American Sign Language; Black American Sign Language

Language codes
- ISO 639-3: –
- Glottolog: None
- IETF: ase-blasl, sgn-ase-blasl (deprecated)

Black American Sign Language (BASL) or Black Sign Variation (BSV) is a dialect of American Sign Language (ASL) used most commonly by deaf Black Americans in the United States. The divergence from ASL was influenced largely by the segregation of schools in the American South. Like other schools at the time, schools for the deaf were segregated based upon race, creating two language communities among deaf signers: Black deaf signers at Black schools and White deaf signers at White schools. As of the mid-2010s, BASL is still used by signers in the South despite public schools having been legally desegregated since 1954.

Linguistically, BASL differs from other varieties of ASL in its phonology, syntax, and vocabulary. BASL tends to have a larger signing space, meaning that some signs are produced farther away from the body than in other dialects. Signers of BASL also tend to prefer two-handed variants of signs, while signers of ASL tend to prefer one-handed variants. Some signs are different in BASL as well, with some borrowings from African American English.

== History ==
Like many American educational institutions for hearing children during the 19th and early 20th centuries, schools for deaf children were segregated based on race. Of the schools for the deaf that were founded, few admitted students of color. Seeing a lack of educational opportunities for Black deaf children, Platt Skinner founded the Skinner School for the Colored Deaf, Dumb, and Blind in 1856 in Niagara Falls, New York. Skinner described his school as "the first effort of its kind in the country ... We receive and instruct those and only those who are refused admission to all other institutions and are despised on account of their color." The school moved to Trenton, New Jersey, in 1860. After it closed in 1866, no Northern state created an institution for Black deaf children. Even after these states outlawed segregation by 1900, integration was sparse, as some institutions allowed Black students and others did not.

After the foundation and success of the American School for the Deaf, many other institutions for the deaf were founded throughout the country. Since schools, particularly in the South, were segregated, many Southern states created separate schools or departments for Black deaf children. The first school established for Black deaf children below the Mason–Dixon line opened in the District of Columbia in 1857; it remained segregated until 1958. The last Southern state to create an institution for Black deaf children was Louisiana in 1938. Black deaf children became a language community isolated from White deaf children, with different means of language socialization, allowing for different dialects to develop. Because the education of White children was privileged over that of Black children, oralism—the prominent pedagogical method of the time—was not as strictly applied to the Black deaf students. Oralist methods often forbid the use of American Sign Language, so Black deaf students had more opportunities to use ASL than did their White peers. Despite the decision in Brown v. Board of Education (1954), which declared racial segregation in public schools to be unconstitutional, integration was slow to come. Schools for the deaf were no exception to the matter: the last desegregated in 1978, 24 years after the decision.

As schools began to integrate, students and teachers noticed a complete difference in the way Black students and White students signed. Carolyn McCaskill, now professor of ASL and Deaf Studies at Gallaudet University, recalls the challenge of understanding the dialect of ASL used by her White principal and teachers after her segregated school of her youth integrated: "When I began attending the school, I did not understand the teacher and she did not understand me because we used different signs." Carl G. Croneberg was the first to discuss differences between BASL and White ASL in his appendices of the 1965 version of the Dictionary of American Sign Language. Work has continued on BASL since then.

As deaf education and sign language research continued to evolve, so did the perception of ASL. With the publication of the Dictionary of American Sign Language, ASL began to be recognized as a legitimate language. The greater acceptance of ASL as a language led to standardization and the development of a prestige dialect, which was based upon the signs used at Gallaudet University. Despite this standardization, ASL has regional and distinct accents similar to spoken languages. Dialects that are different from the standard one, especially those spoken by marginalized groups, are/were often stigmatized. As a non-standard dialect, BASL is stigmatized by signers and considered to be inferior to prestige dialects of ASL. This difference in prestige has led BASL speakers to code-switch to a prestige dialect when speaking with different groups of people, despite BASL being mutually intelligible with other dialects of ASL.

A study of Southern Black signers determined that when compared to older signers who attended segregated schools, younger Black ASL signers express more positive attitudes toward the dialect. Older signers who attended lower-quality schools due to the inequality of "separate but equal" policies believed that White signing is higher quality because it appears to be more complicated. However, this is likely because of the lack of ASL-skilled teachers in the Black schools at the time; there is no evidence that White signing is more official or complex than Black ASL. Black signs are typically more like the "standard" signs taught in schools and textbooks. Black signing is also associated with rhythm and expression.

Table of states with Black Deaf schools
State	White school established	Black school or department established	Integration
Washington, D.C.	1857	1857 (dept.)	1958
North Carolina	1845	1868–1869	1967
Maryland	1868	1872	1956
Georgia	1846	1882	1965
Tennessee	1845	1881 (dept.)	1965
Mississippi	1854	1882 (dept.)	1965
South Carolina	1849	1883 (dept.)	1966
Kentucky	1823	1884 (dept.)	1954–1960
Florida	1885	1885	1965
Texas	1857	1887	1965
Arkansas	1850/1867	1867	1967
Alabama	1858	1868	1968
Missouri	1861	1888 (dept.)	1954
Virginia	1839	1909	1965
Oklahoma	1898	1909 (dept.)	1962
Kansas	1861	1888 (dept.)	1954
Louisiana	1852	1938	1978
West Virginia	1870	1926	1956

== Phonology ==
The gray box represents the typical signing space of ASL. Signers of BASL are more likely to produce signs outside this area than other signers.

When asked, many signers in the South gave anecdotal accounts of differences between the signing of Black and White signers. These differences turned out to be aspects of the differing phonology of BASL. Among these accounts, there were claims that Black signers had a larger signing space and used more two-handed signs. An investigation into these anecdotes has found correlations.

When compared, Black signers were more likely than White signers to produce signs outside the typical signing space and to use two-handed signs. Adverbs are most likely to use a larger signing space. Less marked forms, such as pronouns, determiners, plain verbs, and nouns, tend to be less likely to be produced outside the typical signing space. The selection of two-handed signs over one-handed signs was found to have systematic constraints on their production. When the sign could be produced with one or two hands, Black signers often produced the variant that matched the handedness of the following sign; if the following sign was two-handed, they were more likely to produce a two-handed variant, while if the following sign was one-handed, they were more likely to produce the one-handed variant. The use of innovative one-handed forms, though, even in environments that favored them, did not exceed 50 percent.

BASL signers further tend to favor lowered variants of side-of-forehead signs, resulting in contact at the cheek. The sign Know is usually produced by placing the fingers of a flat hand on the temple, but when lowered, the fingers make contact at the cheek. Early research showed that BASL signers used these lowered forms at a rate of 53 percent, with grammatical category being the strongest constraint. Other conditioning environments for lowered signs depend on preceding location; for instance, signs produced in front of the body lead to lowered sign variants, while signs produced at the head cause signers to favor non-lowered forms.

== Syntax ==
Unlike ASL, BASL allows for the frequent use of syntactic repetition. In a study conducted by McCaskill, of 26 signers (13 Black and 13 White), Black signers had 57 instances of repetition compared to 19 from White signers, and of those 19 instances, 18 were made by a single signer. The use of repetition by BASL signers is considered to be pragmatic rather than as a way to clarify meaning.

A 2004 study conducted by Melanie Metzger and Susan Mather found that Black male signers used constructed action, with or without constructed dialogue, more often than White signers but never used constructed dialogue by itself. These results were not reproduced in a later study into constructed action and constructed dialogue by McCaskill, which found that Black signers not only used constructed dialogue but did so more frequently than White signers.

== Lexical variation ==
Lexical variation between BASL and other dialects of ASL was first noted in the Dictionary of American Sign Language. In a later study of 34 lexical signs, Black signers were found to have 28 signs that White signers did not know. Older signers are more likely to use variant signs than younger signers. Most of these signs, having been developed in segregated schools for the Black deaf, refer to everyday life. Younger signers of BASL are less likely to use these variants, but when asked about them, are aware that older signers have and use these innovative signs.

=== Borrowing from African-American Vernacular English ===
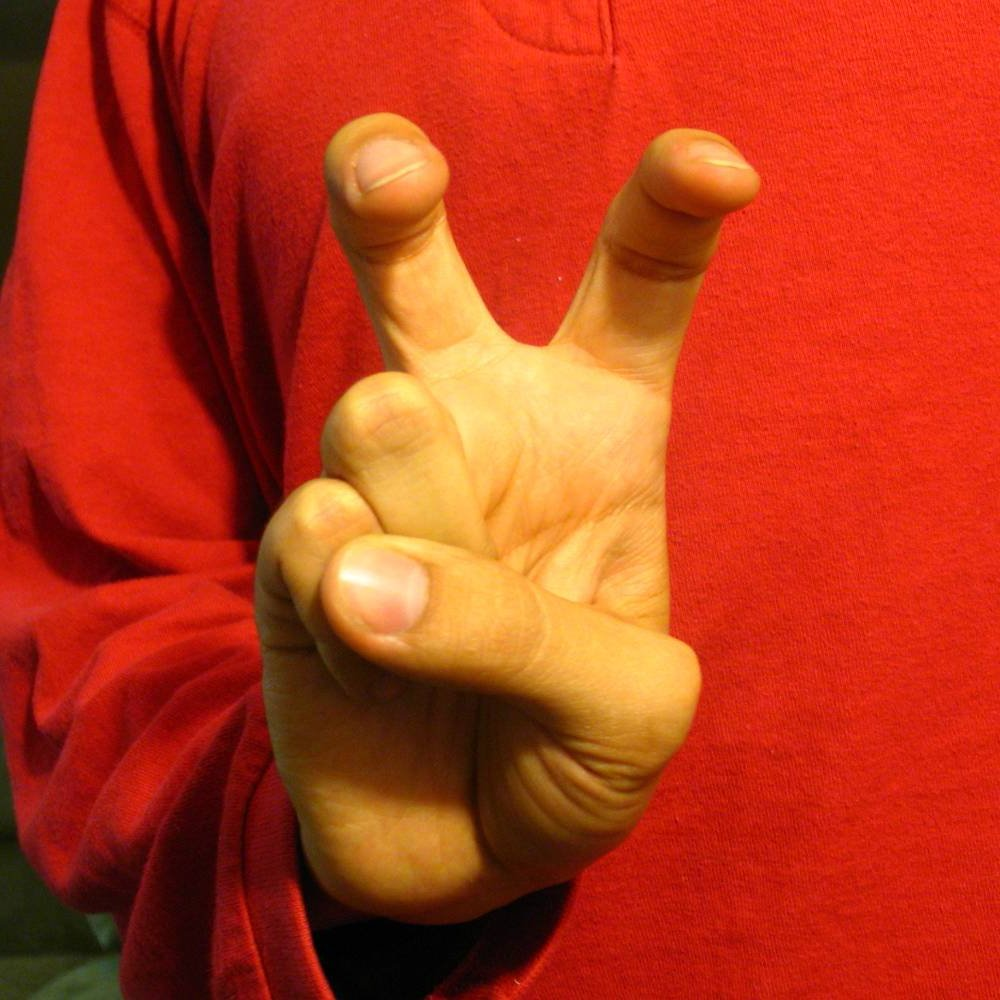
The bent-v handshape used in the sign Stop tripping

A body of work has arisen looking at the similarities between Black American Sign Language and African-American English (AAVE), since both are language varieties marked by their use in African-American communities. In 1998, John Lewis conducted an investigation of the incorporation of aspects of AAVE into BASL. He reported that, during narrative storytelling by a Black signer, there were "Ebonic shifts" marked by shifts in posture and rhythmicity and by incorporating side-to-side head movement. He concluded that this "songified" quality was related to the style of AAVE. This finding was not reproduced by McCaskill, which she attributes to the nature of the speech acts: Lewis analyzed a narrative event, while McCaskill used natural or elicited data. Lexical borrowing has been seen in BASL signers under age 3, which is likely due to the advances in mass media—younger signers would have more contact with AAVE through movies, television, and the Internet.

When asked about distinctive features of their signing, Black deaf signers tended to identify a number of idioms borrowed from AAVE. Some were literal translations, such as I feel you or girl please, which are signed the standard way but have meanings different from their literal interpretation. Other loan words modified existing signs, such as stop tripping, which took the bent-v handshape of trip and moved it up to the head to indicate a new meaning of "stop imagining things".

== See also ==
- Junius Wilson
- Sociolinguistics of sign languages
- Varieties of American Sign Language
