= North Carolina LINKS Program =

North Carolina LINKS is a program of the North Carolina Department of Health and Human Services, Division of Social Services.

The agency's website states that the name LINKS was chosen as a word that captures the purposes and intent of the Foster Care Independence Act also known as The John H Chafee Foster Care Independence Program. Social work research has shown that older youth and young adults who have experienced extended time in foster care are at increased risk of negative consequences once they leave care, such as dropping out of school, unplanned parenthood, high rates of untreated illness, homelessness, criminal activity, depression and suicide. It is these specific issues that the LINKS program addresses Research was also done at the University of Victoria, British Columbia, Canada. plus at the School of Social Work, in partnership with BC Ministry of Children and Family Development, Greater Victoria Child and Youth Advocacy Society and National Youth in Care Network

== Participants of LINKS ==
- The program provides services to youth aged 14–18 while they are in Foster Care and also to young adults aged 18–21 who have aged out or are participating in the Foster Care 18 to 21 program, a voluntary program. In some counties there are also services provided for youth in the 13-15 age range.
- Participation in the LINKS program is voluntary.
- Each participant meets with a LINKS Coordinator to provide individual assistance with the transition towards independence.
- Services provided range from information on delaying parenting & access to health care to help with safe and stable housing.
- Through LINKS Coordinators and Social Workers at the DSS agencies, youth receive the knowledge leading towards independence when finished with the LINKS program.
- Youth who have aged out of foster care can get in touch with the LINKS Coordinators from their county of residence. The LINKS Coordinators will work with youth on: Assessment, Plan, Services, and Funding.

== Resources ==
Youth who are participants in the LINKS program are guided to numerous resources in their geographic area.

== Medicaid expansion for aged out youth ==
In North Carolina there has been legislation passed to allow youth who age out of foster care at 18 until their 21st birthday to have Medicaid. Youth who have aged out will need to apply for Medicaid in the county where they live.

== NC Reach ==
In 2007, NC Reach was created to help youth aging out of foster care with their tuition for post secondary education.

NC Reach is a state-funded scholarship offered to qualified applicants for up to four years of undergraduate study at NC public colleges and universities." Youth must previously apply for other scholarships available alongside FAFSA for Financial Aid at their colleges or universities and be a legal resident of NC. Youth must have aged out of Foster Care or have been adopted on or after their 12th birthday and will be eligible until their 26th Birthday. Youth must attend one of the 74 NC public colleges and universities that are eligible for NC Reach funding. Funding to cover tuition and fees at their school without having to take out student loans ◦Many students also receive a refund which may be used for school-related living expenses ◦Students are matched with a NC Reach coordinator who helps them academically, personally and in designing a career path ◦They are eligible to request a personal coach to assist and encourage their progress in school through telephone calls, email and social media ◦They receive three care packages during each school year ◦They are eligible to participate in the Foster Care to Success InternAmerica Program"

== ETV ==
ETV stands for Education Training Voucher which is a scholarship for youth who are in foster care on their 17th birthday or after. It is a first-come, first-served scholarship available for funding up to $5,000 at one of the various NC public colleges or universities. "The youth must be a legal U.S. citizen or legal non-resident" Their assets at the time of applying for the scholarship must not be equivalent to $10,000. Youth must be 18 years of age when first applying, but younger than 21.

== SAYSO ==
SAYSO is an advocacy group. SAYSO stands for Strong Abled Youth Speaking Out. SAYSO was created in 1998 to help youth have a voice in their lives. SAYSO became a 501(c)(3) organization as of 2002. There are numerous chapters around North Carolina. In March there is a conference held for all different counties of LINKS to come together to hear about things which are changing or happening in the SAYSO organization.

== Sources ==
- NC Division of Social Services website
- NC Courts- Guardian Ad Litem Page for LINKS
- Casey Life Skills Assessment
- NC FAQ Page about LINKS Program
- Housing Assistance for LINKS Youth
- SAYSO Organization
- Education Training Voucher
- NC Reach Scholarship
