= Junius Wilson =

American who was wrongly institutionalized (1908–2001)

- Junius Wilson wearing one of his many hats
- Born: October 8, 1908; Castle Hayne, North Carolina, U.S.
- Died: March 17, 2001 (aged 92); Goldsboro, North Carolina, U.S.

Junius Wilson (October 8, 1908 – March 17, 2001) was a deaf American who spent almost 70 years as a patient in a state mental institution despite not being mentally ill. Born in Castle Hayne, North Carolina, he attended a segregated school for deaf black children in Raleigh. He and other students were never taught American Sign Language (ASL) so they developed their own sign communication called "Raleigh signs", a form of Black American Sign Language. In 1925 a neighbor who felt uncomfortable around Wilson made an apparent false report to police that Wilson had attempted to rape his wife. Since he could not communicate with jail staff and family members did not relay the fact Wilson was deaf, it was assumed he was insane. During a lunacy hearing a judge deemed Wilson mentally ill and a danger to himself and others. At the age of 17 he was sent to the State Hospital for the Colored Insane, now known as Cherry Hospital, in Goldsboro.

Wilson spent several years in the criminally insane ward until he was sterilized and castrated based on a state eugenics program. Wilson became reserved and submissive which aligned with the goals of racial eugenics during the Jim Crow era. He was transferred to the hospital's farm colony where he worked without pay for more than three decades. His father and a sister attempted to have him released in 1947, but they were turned away. It was the last time anyone in his immediate family attempted to visit him.

Deinstitutionalization greatly reduced the number of patients at the hospital, but patients like Wilson were seen as good workers and unable to live on their own. Staff members did not think Wilson was mentally ill but changed his patient status to involuntary commitment to align with new laws. He would often grow frustrated with staff members who only communicated with him via gestures. He was unable to relay his thoughts or feelings since no one bothered to learn his previous history using Raleigh signs. In 1981 an evaluator with knowledge of ASL attempted to communicate with Wilson, the first time this had happened with a staff member since his arrival in 1925. Despite being told Wilson should receive care from people who knew sign language, no changes were made. Wilson suffered a stroke in 1986 which weakened his dominant signing hand, further hindering his ability to communicate.

Wilson's legal guardian and an attorney began contacting state government officials in 1991 to make immediate changes to Wilson's care, including ASL education for staff members, in an attempt to rectify the decades of ableism, paternalism, and racism he had experienced. A settlement was reached in 1992 to guarantee personalized medical care following coverage in news media. A family member of the man who accused Wilson of rape filed a lawsuit on Wilson's behalf, but it was eventually dismissed. Wilson's guardian negotiated a new settlement which guaranteed round-the-clock medical care and a relatively small financial amount. At the age of 85 Wilson was moved out of the hospital's locked ward and he lived in a small cottage on the hospital property. Wilson died in 2001 and was buried at Wayne Memorial Park cemetery. The media attention Wilson received spurred changes to how state institutions treated deaf patients and how eugenics had affected thousands of residents. One of Wilson's bicycles was included in a display at the National Museum of American History to mark the 25th anniversary of the Americans with Disabilities Act.

== Early life ==
=== Childhood and schooling ===
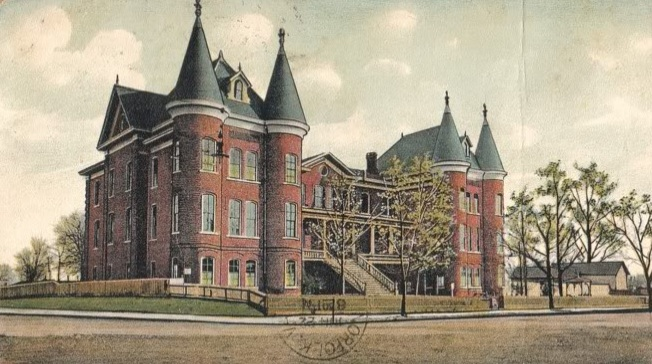
North Carolina School for the Colored Blind and Deaf's Main Building in Raleigh

Junius Wilson was born on October 8, 1908, in Castle Hayne, North Carolina, a small community near Wilmington. Castle Hayne was a predominantly black community at the time, and most houses had dirt floors, no electricity, and no running water. Sidney and Mary Wilson were residents of Castle Hayne and the couple had four children: daughter Asynia (b 1905), one that died as an infant, son Junius, and daughter Carrie (b. 1911). Mary was a housewife and Sidney worked as a woodcutter for a railroad company. Arthur Smith Sr., who worked with Sidney, and his wife Annie lived nearby. The Smiths had four children, including Arthur Smith Jr., and the two families frequently spent time with each other. They raised their families in an area deeply affected by racism, including Jim Crow laws and the Wilmington massacre.

It is unclear when Wilson lost his hearing, but it was possibly at a very young age after contracting scarlet fever. His parents were unable to communicate with him, possibly leading to his parents becoming frustrated. Sidney and Mary's relationship suffered and Sidney left the family, moving to Georgia where he later remarried. As a single mother, Mary needed support and she relied on the Smiths for assistance. Arthur Jr. was a young adult at the time and contributed financially to Mary and her children.

The residential and state-funded North Carolina School for the Colored Blind and Deaf (NCSCBD) in Raleigh was the first segregated school in the U.S. for deaf black children when it was founded in 1868. Beginning in 1907, the state government mandated all deaf children attend school. In January 1916 Wilson was sent to the NCSCBD to receive academic and vocational training. The hope was Wilson would one day be able to live independently and support himself since he was unable to contribute to his family's financial situation.

For most of Wilson's time at the NCSCBD, the superintendent was Gustavus Ernest Lineberry, who was not proficient in American Sign Language (ASL). Lineberry did not want students to be taught by deaf teachers and most of the faculty he did hire did not know ASL. He also limited the use of ASL in classrooms. Lineberry did not believe black students needed a formal education, so he emphasized vocational training including dairy farming and carpentry. Because students were not exposed to ASL education, they improvised their own version of sign language called Raleigh Sign Language (also referred to as "Raleigh signs"), a form of Black American Sign Language that someone fluent in ASL would not be able to understand. The students were unaware of sign language dialects as they were kept separate from black deaf communities and white deaf students who were taught ASL.

While attending the NCSCBD, Wilson was finally able to communicate with others via sign language, though he remained mostly illiterate. He was given a sign name, the initial "J" on the middle of his chest. Wilson communicated not only through Raleigh signs, but also by waving his arms, touching someone's arm or shoulder to get their attention, and yelling at students who were hard of hearing (HoH) but not deaf. Wilson continued attending the NCSCBD until 1924. That year during the school's fall field trip to the Negro State Fair, Wilson did not join his classmates when they returned to school. He stayed for two nights at the fairgrounds, possibly to enjoy the nightly fireworks or to experience a sense of freedom. After Wilson returned to the NCSCBD, he was expelled, ending his ties to a black deaf community.

=== Return home and arrest ===
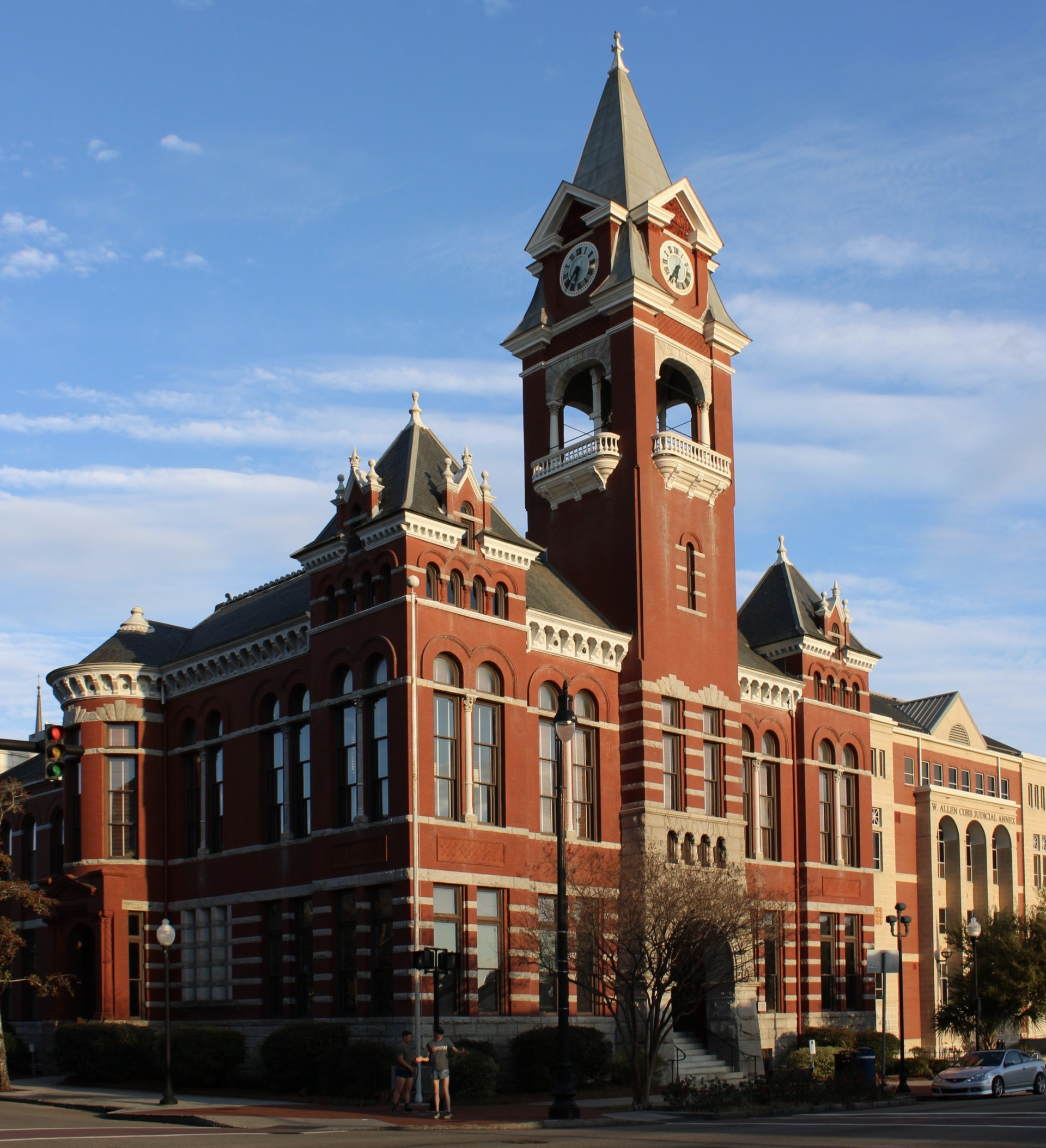
Wilson's trial took place in Wilmington. The New Hanover County Courthouse is pictured.

When Wilson returned home to Castle Hayne, he continued to live with his mother and stepfather, along with his younger sister, Carrie. His older sister, Asynia, had moved away during his time in Raleigh. Arthur Jr. had married Lizzie Sidberry while he was away, and the Smiths and Wilsons continued to have a strong relationship. Mary and Lizzie bonded while maintaining their respective households. Henry, Wilson's stepfather, died in February 1925. Mary once again relied on the Smiths for support since Wilson was unable to assist her financially. Arthur Jr. and Lizzie were not close with Wilson since he had been attending school in Raleigh for many years. Arthur Jr. saw Wilson as a burden since the state no longer paid for his housing and education. Unable to communicate with him, most people in the community avoided contact with Wilson and his isolation worsened. He would often become frustrated and his way of communicating by touching someone, yelling, or stomping his feet was perceived as threatening. Wilson's family was worried these actions might endanger them if he offended white people.

Wilson assumed he was also welcomed into the Smith family like his mother and sister, but Arthur Jr. and Lizzie felt uncomfortable with his presence. Wilson's attempt at reading Lizzie's lips were viewed as a threat. In August 1925 Arthur Jr. contacted police and made an apparent false report that Wilson had assaulted and attempted to rape Lizzie. If Arthur Jr. had accused Wilson of attempting to rape a white woman, it might have resulted in a mob lynching, but since a black woman was the alleged victim, the punishment would be less severe. While gathering sticks in the woods, Wilson was arrested and taken to the New Hanover County jail.

He remained at the jail until November 1925. No one told the police Wilson was deaf, but an employee at the jail apparently realized this and attempted to communicate with him with limited ASL. Since Wilson did not know ASL and tried to communicate by speaking with his deaf voice, the employee assumed Wilson was insane. A lunacy hearing took place that month with the jury composed of white hearing men. Wilson did not have an attorney. A physician examined Wilson and declared him insane and violent. The judge overseeing the hearing said "The mental condition of the defendant is such as to render him dangerous to himself and to other persons, and that his confinement for cure, treatment, and security demands that he be committed to the hospital to be kept in custody therein for treatment and care." Wilson was sent by train to the State Hospital for the Colored Insane (SHCI), now known as Cherry Hospital, in Goldsboro.

== Incarceration ==
=== Criminal ward and castration ===
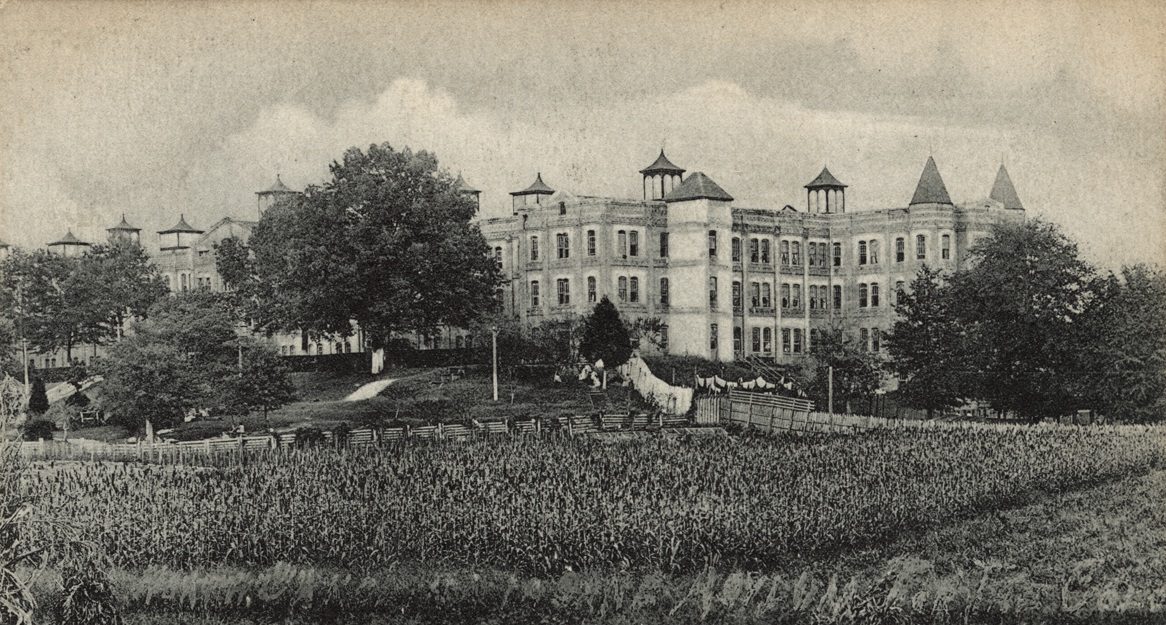
State Hospital for the Colored Insane (now known as Cherry Hospital) in 1907

Seventeen-year-old Wilson arrived at the SHCI on November 21, 1925, and placed in the criminal ward as patient #8229. In a logbook his occupation was listed as "criminal" and his diagnosis as "constitutional psychopathic inferiority". The hospital had over 1,000 beds when Wilson arrived and much of the property was in poor condition. His building, CI (Criminally Insane), was surrounded by barbed wire and had metal bars on its windows. Patients would go outside in an enclosed area but otherwise sat on benches that lined the ward's hallway. The ward was reportedly dark, musty, and lacked sufficient toilets. Outbreaks of various illnesses spread rapidly among patients, some of whom were locked in cages for long periods. Wilson remained in this ward for more than six years.

During this time, Wilson's mother struggled financially and moved in with Annie Smith after her husband Arthur Sr. died. The two women looked after Annie's children and later grandchildren. Mary reportedly avoided Arthur Jr. and grieved quietly for her son, not believing the charges brought against him. Because she relied on the Smith family to survive, she was reluctant to visit Wilson and could not write to him as she was illiterate. For many years family members reportedly never spoke about Wilson and did not attempt to contact or visit him.

During his time in the CI ward, Wilson was one of the first people in North Carolina selected for sterilization after the state legislature passed the "Act to Provide for the Sterilization of the Mentally Defective and Feeble-Minded Inmates of Charitable and Penal Institutions of the State of North Carolina". SHCI superintendent W.C. Linville's listed reasons for Wilson to be surgically castrated included being from a "family of mental defectives", and that he was "criminally insane, mentally deficient, sexually perverted, feebleminded, sexually promiscuous, syphilitic, and deaf and dumb". Linville performed the castration of Wilson on January 20, 1932. After the procedure, he was removed from the CI ward. Wilson became withdrawn, eyes often downward, and stopped touching people in an attempt to communicate. During the Jim Crow era, his submissiveness aligned with the goals of racial eugenics.

=== Farm colony and increased privileges ===
Wilson was moved to the SHCI's nearby farm colony after being castrated. The farm was around 1,000 acres (405 ha) and included dormitories for patients. Wilson lived in one of these dormitories along with around 100 men. Patients on the farm were expected to work to help cover expenses of their institutionalization. There was much less security compared to the CI ward, so Wilson could walk around the farm and visit the Little River that flowed through the property.

In 1933 another deaf black man accused of rape and found criminally insane was sent to the SHCI. James McNeil reportedly tapped on a woman's shoulder while waving his arms, frightening her. McNeil could not communicate with anyone since he only knew Raleigh signs and he had no family in the area. During his trial, he was referred to as "Dummie Graham" and had no legal defense. Since he only knew how to communicate with grunts and gestures, he was deemed insane. The same judge that oversaw Wilson's lunacy hearing oversaw McNeil's trial. A year after arriving at the SHCI, McNeil was also castrated and given the nickname "Big Dummy". He worked in the dining hall and remained unaware of Wilson, despite the two being close in age and sharing the same knowledge of Raleigh signs.

Wilson should have only remained at the SHCI until deemed competent enough to stand trial in Wilmington, but due to his deafness and inability to communicate, hospital staff assumed he was mentally deficient and should remain institutionalized. If he had stood trial and been found guilty, the judge would have likely sent him to prison for many years. If he was found innocent, his family may have been reluctant to welcome him home due to his mother's dependence on the Smiths. Both Wilson and McNeil should have been released when found competent, as evidenced by their transfer from the CI ward, but Linville chose to violate judicial procedure. A factor in this decision was the men were seen as hard workers for the hospital. This action further demonstrated the attitudes prevalent during the Jim Crow era.

After Annie and Arthur Jr. died, Mary and her daughter Carrie reached out to Wilson's father, Sidney. After returning to North Carolina, he and Carrie went to the SHCI on June 5, 1947, requesting administrators release Wilson so he could assist with caring for his elderly mother. Wilson was allowed to spend time with Sidney and Carrie, his first visitors in almost 22 years. Carrie spelled out words to her brother but otherwise was unable to communicate with him. She spelled out Mary's name and the new address of Mary's house in Castle Hayne. Wilson would write these words and numbers down for the rest of his life in an attempt to tell others about his family. Carrie and Sidney were unsuccessful in their attempt to have Wilson released and they never returned to the hospital. Mary and Carrie moved to New York City and Carrie would occasionally send letters to the hospital on Mary's behalf asking about Wilson's well-being. Apparently, Wilson was never told about these letters, but they continued being sent until at least the late 1950s.

In June 1959 the SHCI and many other institutions in the state were renamed with SHCI becoming Cherry Hospital, but the hospital remained segregated. As the civil rights movement spread throughout the country, it had little effect on Wilson and other patients at the time. As Wilson grew older, he was designated a water boy on the farm. He was allowed to visit neighboring properties to retrieve water since staff did not worry about him attempting to escape. He and select patients were allowed to explore woods surrounding the farm and catch fish at the Little River. Since local residents also visited the river to fish, they would pass through the hospital property. Wilson and other patients would stand at the intersection of Old Smithfield Road and North Carolina Highway 581 selling fishing worms to these locals. Wilson used the money he earned to buy snacks, tobacco, and sodas at the hospital's store. He would often sell these snacks on the corner at inflated prices. He eventually earned enough money to buy a Schwinn bicycle, a prized possession he used to explore the surrounding area and seek solitary. Locals found Wilson to be friendly and he would be seen riding his bicycle in downtown Goldsboro. Wilson performed odd jobs for hospital staff and used the earned money to purchase food, puzzles, and additional bicycles, eventually saving up $7,000.

McNeil lived in the CI ward until the 1960s but had already gained privileges that included wearing a police officer uniform and acting as a security guard on hospital property. He performed this unofficial job for decades and staff referred to him as "Police Dummie". He was given a whistle, a pen despite being illiterate, and the sheriff of Wayne County gave him a brass nameplate engraved with "Dummie Graham". He would often direct traffic around the property, using gestures and sounds that sometimes confused visitors and new staff members. He was known to be strict with patients and staff, taking the role seriously, but staff still viewed him as naive and child-like.

Wilson and McNeil finally met at some point in the 1960s and the two men were able to communicate using Raleigh signs. Their interactions were mostly limited to watching baseball games, possibly because Wilson felt uncomfortable with McNeil's police uniform and the memories it could evoke from his arrest in Castle Hayne. Staff suspected McNeil had less mental development and language skills than Wilson. McNeil saw himself as superior to other patients due to his uniform and relations with staff while Wilson preferred to blend into the patient population to avoid attention.

=== Relocation and changes to patient status ===
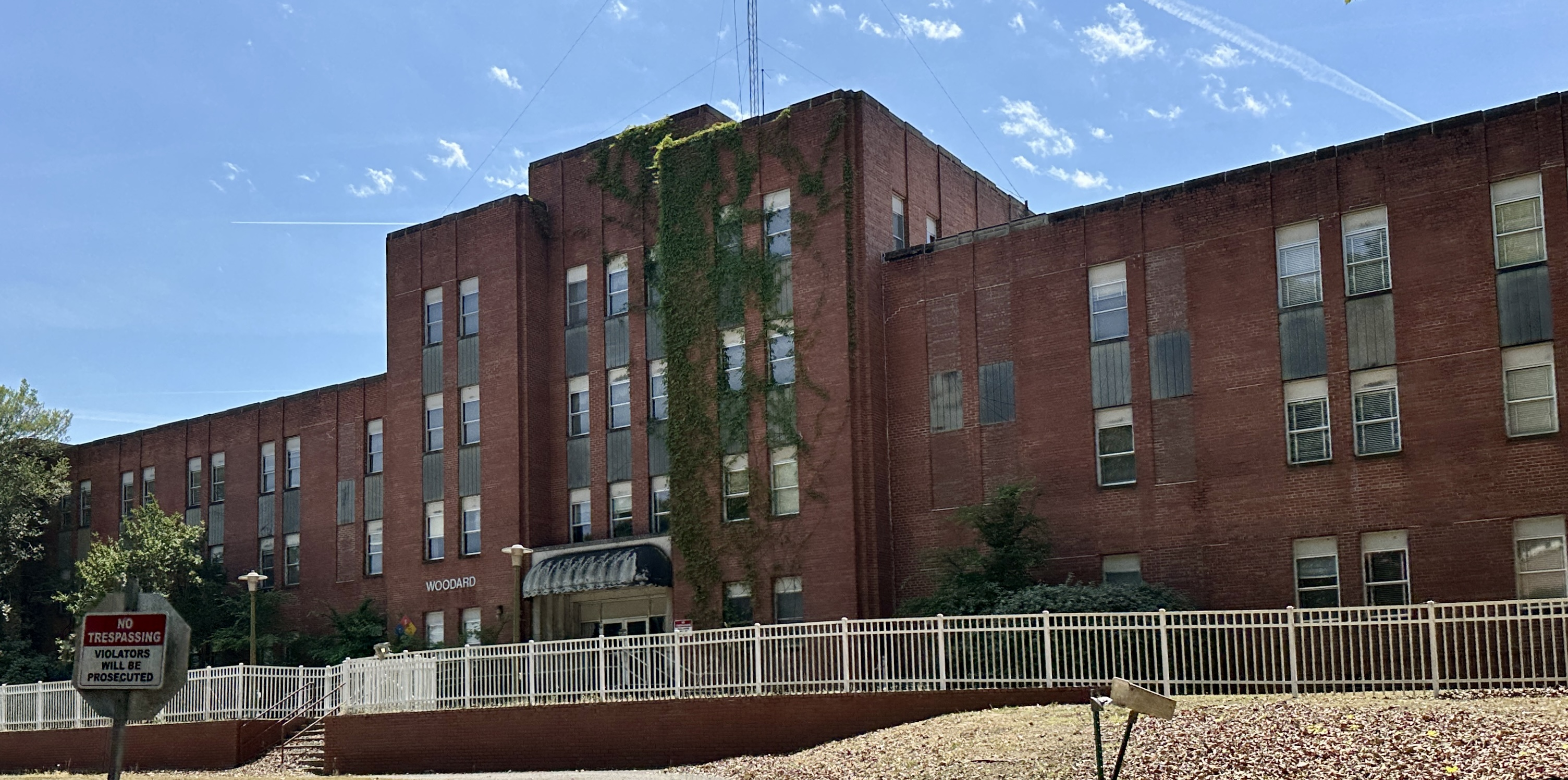
One of the former Cherry Hospital buildings

Following the Civil Rights Act of 1964, state hospitals in North Carolina including Cherry Hospital were desegregated. White patients were admitted and by 1970 the number of black staff members had increased, including the hospital's first black doctors and dentist. There were many changes to patient labor practices after the influx of white patients, many of whom refused to perform tasks for black staff members. One of the changes was ending patient labor in the farm colony. Wilson and other patients were transferred to buildings on the main campus. Wilson was moved back into a locked ward in the Richardson Building and due to poor record keeping, staff thought he was 10 years older than his actual age and considered transferring him to the geriatric ward. McNeil was transferred from the CI ward to another building, but not the same one as Wilson. McNeil's medical files were misplaced at some point and since he had been referred to as "Dummie Graham" or "Policeman Dummie" for decades, staff did not know his real name. After Wilson was transferred to the geriatric ward in the Woodward Building in the early 1970s, he started working in the hospital's car wash that was started as a way for patients to earn federal wages. He continued this job for many years until becoming disabled.

Deinstitutionalization in the United States greatly reduced the number of patients at Cherry Hospital beginning in the 1970s and treatment teams assessed which patients could be discharged. In 1970 a treatment team looked at Wilson's case. Although he had been a patient for 45 years, his medical file was slim. Staff did not think he had a mental illness and viewed him as a good worker and friendly patient who could be discharged. Due to Wilson's legal case in New Hanover County, staff was hesitant to release him. A social worker contacted the clerk of superior court in New Hanover County to inquire about his case. The clerk responded in November 1970 that the charges had been dropped. The social worker attempted to contact Wilson's family so that he could be released on a trial visit. She found letters sent from Mary in the 1950s and sent correspondence to her last known address in New York City. Unbeknownst to the worker, Mary had moved back to Castle Hayne but died in May 1969. A letter sent to Carrie's last known address in Castle Hayne returned unopened since staff did not realize she had moved to New York City.

Another social worker attempted to contact Wilson's mother and sister in 1972 but with no success. She tried contacting his father instead, but he had died in 1963. Staff discontinued the search for his relatives and assumed he would not be able to live on his own. Due to new laws passed in relation to hospital commitment, Wilson's status was changed to involuntary commitment. The reasons given for this status include Wilson being "unable to care for himself because of his handicapps [sic]" and because he was "deaf-mute" who had "social maladjustment, without psychiatric disorder".

The hospital established the Community House in the 1970s, a place to teach patients basic life skills. Different forms of therapy took place at the Community House, including music, but staff did not have a way of telling him the purpose of this activity. Since he could not hear the music, Wilson rarely participated and when he did, seemed confused why he was there. Staff would use gestures in an attempt to communicate complex ideas with him, but he did not understand and would sometimes grow frustrated. Staff interpreted his frustration and outbursts as signs of his inability to care for himself. Despite notes written in his medical file that staff should learn better ways to communicate with Wilson, no one learned ASL. He would attempt to tell staff he wanted to return home by continually writing "Mary Clark", "Carrie Wilson", and "Castle Hayne".

Notes in Wilson's medical file at this time include attempts to explain why he was still a patient: "Placement does not seem feasible at this time due to his hearing constraints, his age constraints, and his special adaptation here" and "He has difficulty of being deaf-mute and he has already learned his way around and the way to communicate with different staff members and employees and seems very happy.". Notes were also added to his medical file that Wilson was ineligible for discharge due to legal constraints, despite the charges having already being dropped. Eventually he was regarded as a "life-timer" incapable of independent living.

There were additional reasons why the hospital said it was unable to discharge Wilson. Although he had spent decades working on the hospital's farm and in the dining hall, Wilson never received pay for this and did not pay taxes to qualify for Medicare. The wages he did earn at the car wash and by performing odd jobs for staff members made him ineligible for Medicaid since his wages exceeded state guidelines for financial assistance. This lack of government assistance was seen as a barrier to his discharge, as well as the failure to contact his family members. Since no one responded to letters, it was assumed no one in Wilson's family cared about his well-being. On January 10, 1980, a physician deemed Wilson mentally ill, but not a danger to himself or others, thus a candidate for discharge. In response, his treatment team had Wilson sign a voluntary commitment form, despite him being mostly illiterate.

=== Further evaluations and stroke ===
In January 1981, Wilson met with vocational rehabilitation evaluator Rachel Wright who had knowledge of ASL since her grandparents were deaf. Although he used Raleigh signs, Wright was able to understand some of the things he said. Wilson fingerspelled his name and told her he had attended a deaf school. This conversation with Wright was the first time since his arrival in 1925 that Wilson could understand the language a staff member used with him. During the next three months, Wright learned more of Wilson's past and realized he could carry on normal conversations. He told her about the money he saved, the items he had bought, and how he enjoyed working at the car wash. When asked about his family, Wilson said he had not seen them in a long time, that they were all dead, and signed the word "gone". Her interactions with Wilson demonstrated to Wright that he was a normal deaf person, but due to decades without exposure to deaf culture, his language skills had suffered. Despite Wright's efforts, no one in Wilson's treatment team learned sign language.

Sign language instructor Frankie Jordan met with Wilson in 1983, and he told her about the years he spent at the deaf school in Raleigh. She realized he had forgotten most of his sign language skills due to isolation from deaf people and observed his gestures to communicate with staff members. Jordan understood why Wilson would become frustrated at times, and similar to Wright, she criticized the hospital's unwillingness to accommodate Wilson and other deaf patients. From the hospital's point of view, if accommodations were made for Wilson, they would have to made for McNeil and other deaf patients and that it would be a drain on its limited financial resources. The evaluations by Wright and Jordan were largely ignored. If staff members agreed that Wilson was merely a deaf person and not someone with mental health issues, it would be an admission he had been mistreated for decades.

During the summer of 1986, Wilson began experiencing weakness on the right side of his body which included a weak grip and difficulty moving his leg. He was later found unresponsive, likely the result of a small stroke. After regaining consciousness, Wilson had difficulty moving the fingers on his right hand. He was no longer able to work at the car wash or earn extra money by performing odd jobs. The weakness of his dominant right hand meant he now had an additional barrier in communicating with others and he became easily frustrated.

Wilson showed signs of depression after the stroke. He no longer worked on his jigsaw puzzles or went outside and was easily annoyed by staff and other patients. He now spent most of his time sitting in front of a television which lacked closed captioning. Five months after his stroke, Wilson was seen by staff from the physical therapy department. Medical records listed Wilson's age as 84 at the time, so based on this, the fact he had difficulties communicating, and the hospital's limited resources, it was recommended he receive no physical therapy.

=== Guardianship and outside assistance ===
James McNeil was referred to as "Police Dummie" or "Dummie Graham" by hospital staff.

A 1988 federal lawsuit, Thomas S. v. Flaherty, introduced changes for people with disabilities living in North Carolina institutions. For some this included being discharged from hospitals and help with access to community services, while others were to receive more personalized care as patients. Carolina Legal Assistance (CLA), a legal aid group from Raleigh, was involved in the case and sought to help black men and women who were considered "feebleminded" and had not received adequate care. Since Wilson was no longer considered mentally ill, he was not qualified for protection under the Thomas S. case. McNeil did qualify and his real name was found in older medical records, although many staff members would still refer to him as "Police Dummie" or "Dummie Graham". State government officials repeatedly appealed the Thomas S. judgment so the process of discharging patients like McNeil was delayed and he continued living in the CI ward.

Social worker Linda Taylor was hired at Cherry Hospital in December 1989 and took an active approach in trying to further assist Wilson. As his health continued to deteriorate, members of his treatment team concluded Wilson would need a legal guardian to assist him with "making an informed consent for any medical problem that may arise." Wilson was still listed as a voluntary patient, so his treatment team had him deemed incompetent by a judge. The judge also required a guardian ad litem be appointed.

Taylor contacted John Wasson, the assistant director for social services in New Hanover County, asking him to serve as Wilson's guardian. Wasson wanted to review Wilson's case before accepting this role and contacted Cherry Hospital administrators. As he read Wilson's medical files, Wasson learned he had been castrated, he was not mentally ill, and hospital staff knew the criminal charges had been dropped. Wasson became angry and eagerly agreed to become Wilson's guardian. The full picture of Wilson's life at Cherry Hospital was apparent: "he had been incarcerated in an insane asylum merely because he was deaf, black, and poor, and bureaucratic inertia and staff paternalism helped keep him there for sixty-five years." Wasson was appointed Wilson's guardian on March 12, 1991.

Before his first meeting with Wilson, Wasson contacted Wilmington attorney Jim Wall who recommended CLA to assist with disability advocacy. Wasson spoke with CLA attorney Paul Pooley who had some experience with deaf people and the two decided the first step would be to determine "what, how, and with whom Wilson communicated." They contacted Denise Parks who worked at the Caswell Developmental Center in Kinston since she had some knowledge of ASL. In April 1991 she met Wilson and observed him using home signs which are gestures and signals often used when a deaf person does not know the predominant sign language in their community. She switched to using a pidgin form of communication and learned more details of his life. Wilson shared his sign name, "J" on the chest, which was noted in his medical file for the first time. After their meeting, Parks informed Wasson, Pooley, Wilson's treatment team, and social workers that Wilson had signing skills, but ones that he had made as a way to communicate with hearing people at the hospital. She also said he was capable of understanding signs. Both of these revelations surprised many of those present at the meeting.

=== First steps in legal justice ===
Because Wilson's medical file said he was older than his actual age, Wasson and Pooley decided they should act quickly to address the issues raised by Verhoeven in fear Wilson could soon die. They assumed filing a lawsuit on Wilson's behalf might take years to make its way through the state judicial system, so they chose not to do this. Instead, Wasson and Pooley contacted Wall and attorney Roger Manus from CLA to assist with writing letters to state government officials in 1992. After their letters went unanswered, the legal team contacted David Flaherty, secretary of the North Carolina Department of Health and Human Services, who was an advocate for patients mistreated in state hospitals. Flaherty forwarded their correspondence to lawyers working in the state's Department of Justice. Michelle McPherson, a lawyer previously involved in the Thomas S. case, was working for the Department of Justice at the time and expedited the process for a settlement.

Meanwhile Cherry Hospital administrators had delayed enacting recommendations made by a specialist, except the purchase of a television with closed captioning. Interpreter Cathy Sweet was eventually hired to teach some of the staff members basic ASL, but many of them saw this as burdensome. When Sweet met Wilson, she noticed he communicated with Raleigh signs. She encouraged him to attend the ASL training sessions with staff, but he was reluctant. A deaf janitor working at the hospital who knew ASL was assigned to have regular visits with Wilson beginning in late 1992. These actions were recognized by Wasson and Pooley, but they agreed the hospital should do more to accommodate Wilson since he had endured decades of ableism, paternalism, and racism. Staff members were offended at the suggestion Wilson had been mistreated.

Wasson and the legal team warned state officials they would bring a lawsuit if immediate changes were not made. A settlement with the state was reached on October 26, 1992, which included continued ASL training for staff members, interpreters and counseling for Wilson, medical and rehabilitation services, sign language instruction for Wilson, the purchase of items including a reclining chair to be used solely by Wilson, and the possibility of Wilson being moved to housing outside the hospital. A consultant was hired to monitor the implementation of the settlement. Part of the settlement agreement stipulated that Wilson's legal representatives would not file any additional lawsuits.

=== Media attention ===
Worried that state and hospital officials might not follow through with all aspects of the settlement, Wasson and Pooley began contacting members of the press. They hoped public knowledge of Wilson's life story would result in increased pressure to comply with the settlement. Details of Wilson's life, including his 1925 trial and the fact hospital staff knew he was not insane in 1970, were reported in several newspapers throughout North Carolina. The result was anger among the public at the decades of mistreatment Wilson endured and there were calls for justice. In response to questions on why he was still a patient, hospital officials said Wilson's status was voluntary, but Wall pointed out Wilson had no way of knowing what he had signed in 1980. News outlets throughout the United States began reporting on Wilson's story and readers sent him letters and gifts. Since his love for hats had been covered in news articles, readers sent Wilson a large number of them, including one sent by the Charlotte Hornets.

The deputy director of the state's mental health services fielded questions from angry North Carolinians who demanded further justice. He told Cherry Hospital's director and the directors of the state's other mental institutions that all deaf patients must receive adequate care, including interpreters. There were 26 deaf patients in total throughout the four state hospitals, including McNeil, who was listed as a voluntary patient from 1979 to 1990. The media spotlight on Wilson's case resulted in increased accommodations and medical care for other deaf patients.

Cherry Hospital and state officials disliked the media attention and attempted to defend Wilson's care. Staff members agreed that what had happened to Wilson in the past was wrong, but that since the 1960s he had a lot of freedom and was cared for by the hospital. They also disliked the perception Wilson had been living in a locked cage and argued he received better care at the hospital than he would have living on his own. An unforeseen result of the news coverage was people related to Arthur Smith Jr. and his wife Lizzie (née Sidberry) had read Wilson's story and began contacting Wasson.

=== Contact with relatives ===
Wilson was taken to visit Castle Hayne on April 1, 1993, and he became excited while passing familiar buildings and sites. During this visit he met with Willie and Annie Sidberry, Lizzie Smith's grandson and spouse, whom he did not recognize. Some distant relatives did not want to be involved with Wilson, possibly due to embarrassment after the media coverage, but the Sidberrys took an interest. They felt incapable of caring for an elderly person with whom they could not communicate and thought he would receive proper help at Cherry Hospital. After returning from the visit to his hometown Wilson seemed happier and more energetic.

Seattle resident Andre Branch, Arthur Branch Jr.'s grandson, learned of Wilson's story and began questioning his relatives, including his aunt Sarah Peoples. He received little information. Branch contacted Wilson's sister, Carrie, who was still living in New York City. She told Branch "I want my brother out of that place. If there is anything you can do to get him out of that place, I will love you forever." Branch called Wasson and the two had a friendly conversation. They arranged for Branch and Pooley to travel to Harlem to meet Carrie, but when they arrived at her house, she would not meet with either of them. Branch was seen as the family spokesperson and would have conversations regularly with Wasson, whom he praised as Wilson's legal guardian.

Branch wanted Wilson to be taken to New York City to meet his sister. Wasson's delayed response, Wilson's continued living situation in a locked ward, and Wasson's determination that it would be detrimental to Wilson's health to travel that far, suggesting Carrie travel to North Carolina instead, angered Branch. He implied racism and paternalism were the causes for Wasson's refusal and relations between the two men soured. Wilson had been experiencing health issues, including one occurrence when his heart stopped, which had been a factor in Wasson's decision. Wasson said arrangements were being made to have Wilson moved to a cottage on the hospital property, but Branch was not pleased with the slow progress.

=== Interacting with other deaf people ===
Meanwhile Pooley contacted Brenda Aron, a deaf woman whose husband worked for a state deaf agency, to reassess Wilson's language skills. Unlike previous assessments, this was done by someone who recognizes challenges and discrimination experienced by deaf people. When Aron asked Wilson his name during their first meeting he fingerspelled J-U-N-S-W-I-L-S-O-N and she observed him interacting with hearing people. Wilson fingerspelled FAR AWAY when asked about his sister Carrie. To Aron it was evident Wilson had more mental and language capabilities than listed in his medical file. Aron and another deaf evaluator, Paul Schreyer, worked with Wilson over several months and he would gleefully watch the two deaf people communicate with each other.

Aron was possibly the first deaf white woman Wilson had met. She and Schreyer realized Wilson might show more progress by communicating with another deaf black person. While working at East Carolina University, Schreyer had met Doris Bowden. Her father, Farmville resident Everett Parker, had attended the same school for deaf black children Wilson attended as a child. Parker was asked to meet with Wilson. The two men instantly bonded after Parker began using Raleigh signs, although Wilson had forgotten a lot of the dialect. Hospital administrators began paying Parker to make regular visits to Wilson, honoring part of the settlement reached with the state.

=== Finding a house ===
In the summer of 1993 Wilson told Taylor he wanted "to go home" and signed YOU, ME, DRIVE AWAY, but no family member in Castle Hayne showed interest in housing him. There were different proposals made for living arrangements, but the staff psychiatrist thought Wilson would be more comfortable spending his last years in the hospital. Due to his recurring health issues, the idea of Wilson living independently in an apartment in Goldsboro or Wilson, home to the Eastern North Carolina School for the Deaf, was dismissed. Everyone involved with his care agreed he should no longer live in a locked ward.

Wasson and Pooley began inquiring about one of the small cottages on the hospital property at the intersection of West Ash Street and Old Smithfield Road. The formal request in 1993 for Wilson to be moved to one of the cottages was rejected by hospital administrators. After the men pointed out the settlement terms, which stated Wilson could be moved to new housing, hospital administrators relented and plans were made to renovate the cottage.

After renovations began on the cottage lead paint was discovered, delaying Wilson's planned move-in date since state regulations required a bidding process on lead paint removal. Wasson and Pooley argued since Wilson was near the end of his life, it was more important to move him out of the locked ward as soon as possible than worry about long-term effects of lead poisoning. The men contacted the press to increase public pressure on hospital administrators. In response, state government officials agreed to quickly approve a $49,000 renovation bid and recommence work on the cottage in December.

== Semi-independent living ==
=== Moving out of the locked ward ===
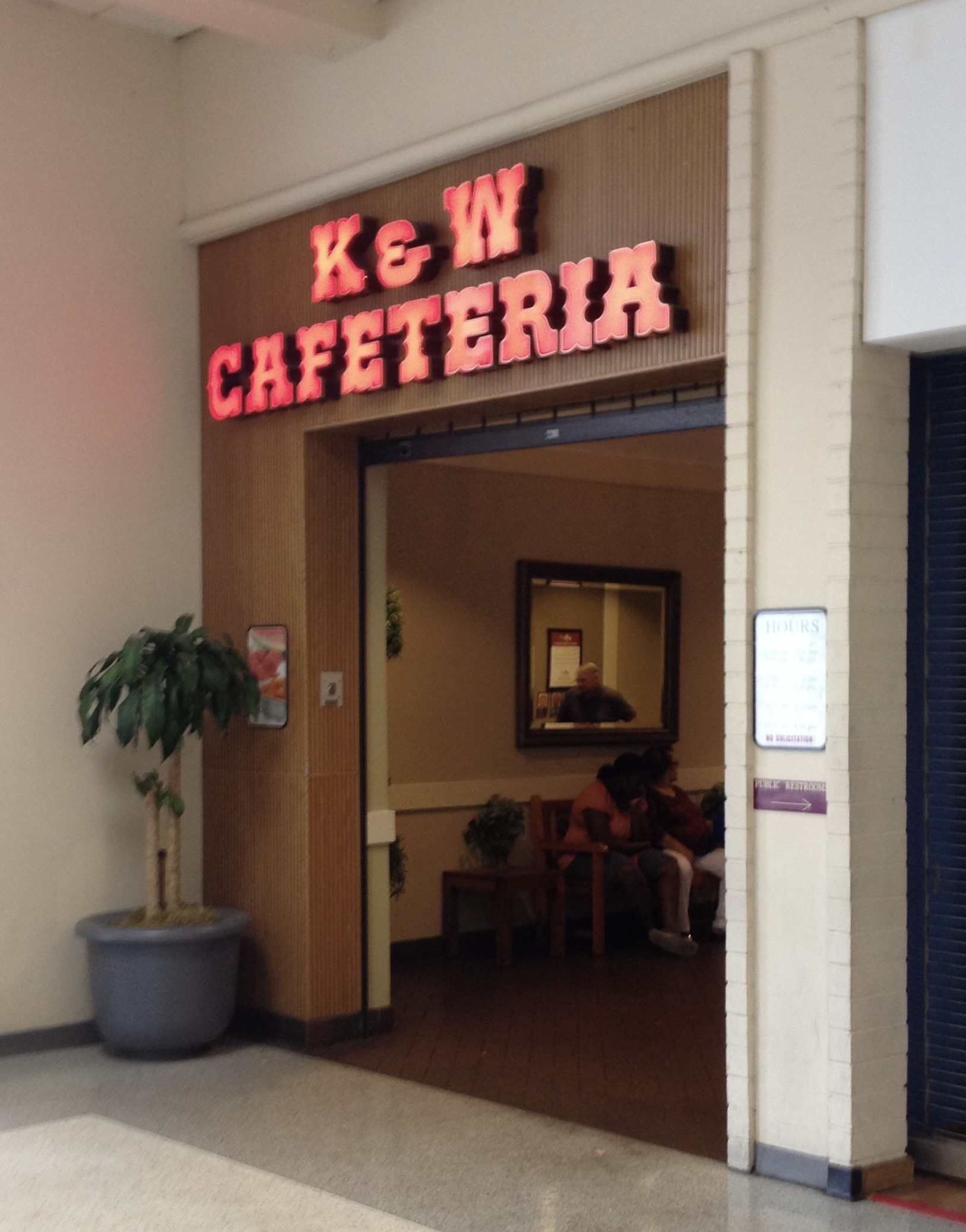
Wilson enjoyed eating lunch at the K&W Cafeteria in Berkeley Mall.

Staff members took Wilson to his cottage on January 11, 1994, to show him where he would be living. To mark the occasion of Wilson moving out of the hospital, staff members took him shopping and bought him a suit for the move-in day and casual wear for his wardrobe. In addition to the renovation, the hospital purchased furniture, bedding, kitchenware, a washer and dryer, and other household items, some of which Wilson picked out himself. On the morning of February 4, a driver met Wilson and his care team and drove him 100 yards (91 m) to the cottage. Wilson wore his suit and a Washington Redskins hat as he was pushed up the wheelchair ramp installed for him. After moving in at 11:30am, Parker, Wasson, and Pooley sat with Wilson in the living room of his three-bedroom brick home, located across the street from where the CI ward once stood. Wilson was elated and for his first meal in the cottage he and Parker ate fried chicken and mashed potatoes for lunch.

Health technicians monitored Wilson around the clock, nurses checked on him three times a day, staff members prepared his meals, and a driver took him wherever he wanted to visit. Wilson liked showing his belongings to people visiting his cottage. He would point to objects, then himself, indicating they were his. He especially enjoyed showing off his large collection of hats. Although he enjoyed his new sense of freedom, Wilson often showed signs of isolation. He would sign his desire to go home, but Parker and interpreters did not know if he was referring to Castle Hayne. He was no longer surrounded by the familiar faces of patients and staff members. Parker continued to visit regularly, and Wilson would sometimes be driven to Parker's house in Farmville.

After some time had passed Wilson became more comfortable with a routine of living in his cottage, visiting friends and staff members in his old ward, and enjoying trips to local restaurants and shops. He liked eating breakfast at Hardee's and lunch at K&W Cafeteria, putting puzzles together, and watching television. When visiting the hospital, Wilson would sometimes participate in monthly deaf programs, eat meals with patients, and attend social events. Wilson's care team did not think he should spend so much time visiting the hospital, so arrangements were made for some of the patients to visit his cottage. McNeil spent time with Wilson with the two men having conversations in the living room.

McNeil continued to visit during the next several months, sometimes joined by Parker. The men would eat meals together or watch television. A staff member escorted McNeil back to the Woodard Building at the end of each visit. In August 1994 McNeil died of heart failure at Dorothea Dix Hospital. Due to delays in his legal case, McNeil had never been discharged from Cherry Hospital. Wilson attended McNeil's memorial service at the hospital chapel, and he was visibly upset and tearful at the graveside ceremony. The grave marker was inscribed with his name and "Dummie Graham".

=== Branch's lawsuit ===
Branch contacted Wasson saying he was not satisfied with Wilson's living arrangements. He thought Wilson should have been moved to a house off the hospital property. He also did not like the fact Wasson, a white man, was Wilson's legal guardian. This view differed from previous comments made by Branch which praised Wasson's guardianship and desire for justice. Branch insisted he be appointed guardian. The Sidberrys, who made regular visits to see Wilson, were satisfied with the status quo, including Wasson's guardianship, Wilson's cottage, and the hospital's continued treatment. Despite previous conflicts between Wasson and hospital administrators, he thought Wilson's current care and living arrangement was the best option, and hospital administrator Marshall Smith believed Wasson was the best option as guardian if the Sidberrys were not interested in assuming that role.

In November 1994 Branch and his legal team sued the North Carolina government, Cherry Hospital, the CLA, the New Hanover County Department of Social Services (NHCDSS), and Wasson, on behalf of Wilson. The $150 million lawsuit alleged the plaintiffs were guilty of assault and battery based on Wilson's castration, and false imprisonment since hospital staff members knew Wilson was not guilty of a crime. The lawsuit cited Section 504 of the 1973 Rehabilitation Act and the 1990 Americans with Disabilities Act (ADA).

In the fall of 1995 state attorney Bruce Ambrose began deposing Wilson's relatives, hospital staff members, state government officials, and Wasson. Among the questions Ambrose had were if Wilson qualified under the ADA criteria, if there was a statute of limitations on the abuse Wilson had suffered, and why relatives had not visited Wilson prior to recent media coverage. Branch and his attorney traveled to Raleigh to answer questions from Ambrose in November 1995. The meeting was awkward and often tense with Branch giving incomplete answers to some of the questions. Branch told Ambrose Wilson's life story was a symbol of racism that had begun in the Jim Crow era and the only real freedom Wilson could experience involved cutting all ties with Cherry Hospital. In some of the follow up questions about the family, Branch declined to provide answers including contact information for relatives. When asked to give examples of intimidation of family members, Branch said Wilson had not been allowed to travel to New York City to visit Carrie.

A startling fact was unearthed when researchers looked at Wilson's school records. According to his hospital records Wilson was born in 1898 when his birth year was actually 1908. This meant he entered the hospital at 17. If Wasson and other advocates had known Wilson was younger than reported, it may have affected earlier decisions regarding his legal settlement and attempts to have him discharged. During the legal battle one aspect that upset many members of the public was Wasson and CLA being included in the lawsuit. Based on public backlash, in December 1995 Branch's legal team dropped Wasson, CLA, and the NHCDSS from the lawsuit in exchange for Wasson agreeing to have an independent party decide who should be Wilson's guardian, the NHCDSS paying Branch's legal team $6,000, and CLA providing 20 hours of free legal services to Branch's legal team each month for a year unless the trial ended beforehand.

Ambrose deposed Carrie, but she refused to testify based on poor memory and told Branch's legal team "since her daddy died, she figured there wasn't much that could be done for her brother." Jennie Bowman, Wilson's niece, agreed to answer questions in December 1995. She was raised by Wilson's mother after his arrest and knew many details of the Wilson and Smith families. Hospital staff members and Wasson thought Wilson had been arrested for the attempted rape of a white woman, but Bowman clarified it was the Smiths who made the accusation and that it was "widely known by the family" Smith Jr. had Wilson arrested under false pretenses. Wilson's niece Annie Mae Williams was a small child when he had been arrested and witnessed the event. She said Wilson's mother did not believe he was guilty. Smith Jr. and Lizzie's children, Fannie Thomas and Virginia Smith Branch, testified in 1996 they did not believe Wilson had attacked their mother.

News articles covering the relatives' testimonies shocked readers. Since most of Wilson's relatives thought he was innocent but did not fight for his release, the public no longer saw them as victims, but rather complicit in his long incarceration. The fact Branch was the grandson of the man who made the false claims and his lack of knowledge about the family's history hurt his credibility. State officials argued Wilson deserved justice, but his relatives did not deserve anything. The reaction to media coverage of their testimonies fractured the relationship among Wilson's relatives. Williams did not think Branch should be involved with Wilson's case because he didn't know him or anything about his earlier life. She also said his grandfather was the reason Wilson had been institutionalized.

In 1996 the clerk of court in New Hanover County ruled against Branch's request to become guardian. A judge later ruled Branch's lawsuit could not continue and that he must reimburse court costs associated with researching and locating Wilson's relatives since he had refused to provide that information. Branch unsuccessfully appealed the ruling and attempted to have another relative appointed guardian. The clerk of court ruled against this since the relative had little knowledge of Wilson's life. After losing his lawsuit, Branch never visited or sent packages to Wilson again.

=== New guardian and lawsuit ===
The New Hanover County clerk of court appointed attorney Helen Hinn to be Wilson's new guardian. Wasson's last day as Wilson's guardian was July 19, 1996, after he accepted a new job in Stokes County. Hinn contacted the Charlotte law firm Ferguson, Stein, Wallas, Adkins, Gresham & Sumter that specialized in civil rights cases to assist with a modified version of Wasson's original lawsuit. Ferguson et al focused on the racism, disability discrimination, and lack of proper medical care which had violated Wilson's civil rights.

State government officials argued the statute of limitations had expired since most civil rights violations occurred in the 1920s and 1930s. They also argued the 1992 settlement prevented further litigation and that since family members had contributed to Wilson's ordeal and had not visited him for decades, there had been no alternative to his incarceration. Since hospital medical staff had determined Wilson was not mentally ill, state officials said he did not qualify for disability protection according to the ADA. A judge determined in January 1997 that the statute of limitations had not run out, Wasson did not have legal authority to agree to the 1992 settlement therefore it was dismissed, and that Ferguson et al could seek monetary damages on Wilson's behalf.

Hospital staff members made attempts to communicate with Wilson's family, but due to media attention from the lawsuit, most did not respond. Wilson did make regular visits to the Sidberrys' house, but he never showed affection for them. He was also taken to area social events, including baseball games and parades, and trips to various sites around the state and to Myrtle Beach, South Carolina. His favorite activity appeared to be simply riding in a car. Wilson would often sign HOME and FAR FAR, I WANT TO FAR FAR which Parker assumed meant Castle Hayne. Since Wilson never grew excited around family members in Castle Hayne and would sometimes indicate he did not consider the cottage his home, staff members were not sure where he wanted to live.

In November 1997 Junius Wilson v. the State of North Carolina was closed after Hinn and Ferguson et al agreed to a settlement. Hinn wanted to end the lawsuit due to Wilson's age and failing health. Terms of the settlement included a $226,000 payment, continued round-the-clock care which cost the state an estimated $250,000 per year, and continued usage of the cottage. The attorney fees totaled $111,261 leaving Wilson with $114,739. Wilson was never told about the two lawsuits on his behalf. The Branch and Smith families had little contact with Wilson after the settlement. The Sidberrys still made regular visits to Wilson's cottage and invited him to visit their home.

=== Final years ===
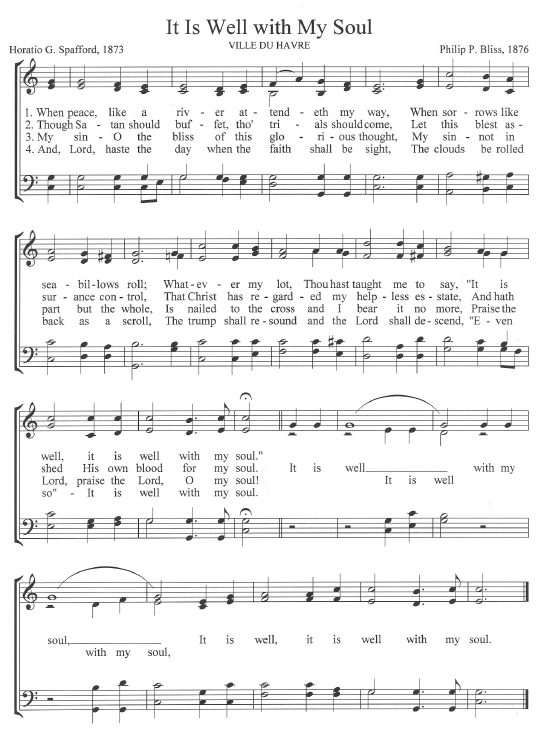
Social worker Linda Taylor played It Is Well with My Soul on a violin at Wilson's funeral.

During the last few years of his life Wilson spent time with Parker, attended baseball games, ate at local restaurants, and went on shopping trips. Locals that saw him and knew of his story pitied him. In late 2000 Wilson's health deteriorated after contracting pneumonia. Hospital medical staff wanted to move him to the hospital's nursing home unit, but Hinn disagreed. As his health continued to decline, she agreed to the decision and Wilson was moved out of his cottage. He likely did not understand why he had been removed from his home. Wilson was later transferred to Wayne Memorial Hospital and was accompanied during most of his stay. On March 17, 2001, at the age of 92 Wilson died of respiratory heart failure while in the hospital.

His funeral took place on March 23 in the Cherry Hospital chapel with over 100 people in attendance. Wilson's casket was made of black polished wood, and he was dressed in a suit. Floral arrangements surrounded the casket, one shaped like a fish to note Wilson's previous love of fishing, and hospital technicians served as pallbearers. Wasson and Willie Sidberry were among those who spoke at the funeral. Hospital administrator Marshall Smith said Wilson was loved and appreciated, emphasizing hospital staff regarded Wilson as a family member. One health technician sang If I Can Help Somebody by Black songwriter Alma Bazel Androzzo and Wilson's longtime social worker Taylor played It Is Well with My Soul on a violin. Parker sat on the front row during the service and was pleased with the outpouring of care. Wilson was buried in Wayne Memorial Park cemetery, one row in front of McNeil's headstone. Wilson's death was covered in local newspapers, with many noting the struggles he faced but also the freedoms he enjoyed during his later years.

== Legacy ==
In Wilson's biography Unspeakable: The Story of Junius Wilson, which received positive reviews in The Journal of American History, Sign Language Studies, Law and History Review, The Washington Post, and Wilmington Morning Star, authors Susan Birch and Hannah Joyner wrote:

Junius Wilson's life offers powerful reminders that there are no simple answers to the thorny questions surrounding racism, poverty, policy towards people with disabilities, and institutionalization. It is not even clear how best to provide justice to those who have been wronged in the past. But Wilson's story clearly demonstrates the danger of believing that the problems of the past are behind us. As his story attests, we are inextricably bound to who we have been and what we have done as a society."

To deaf advocates and people involved with Wilson's case, his story is a warning on unchecked authority, and the isolation deaf people often experience. They argued although laws and regulations have been passed since Wilson's trial and incarceration to protect vulnerable people, it is important to remember the obstacles deaf people and others with disabilities still face in society. Because of the media attention brought to Wilson's life story, changes were made in North Carolina's institutions to accommodate deaf people. For instance, Dorothea Dix Hospital opened a unit in 1994 for deaf patients.

The harm caused by eugenic sterilizations was acknowledged by some states beginning in the early 2000s and Wilson's legal case served as a model for those in North Carolina seeking justice. In late 2002 and early 2003 the Winston-Salem Journal wrote a five-part series titled "Against Their Will: North Carolina's Sterilization Program" bringing attention to the state's racial eugenics program from 1929 to 1973 in which over 7,000 people were sterilized. Black North Carolinians were heavily overrepresented in these numbers. In response to the series, Governor Mike Easley issued an apology on the state's behalf. In 2014 the North Carolina state government began compensating surviving sterilization victims, although some were found not qualified due to technicalities.

In honor of the 25th anniversary of the ADA, the National Museum of American History displayed objects by four people with disabilities in an exhibit titled "The Americans with Disabilities Act, 1990-2015". One of these objects was Wilson's last bicycle that Birch located in a Cherry Hospital shed during her book research. Describing Wilson's life as "one of the troubling chapters of American ableism...and racism", the exhibit noted how an object such as his bicycle can create "dignity, purpose, and a larger identity" and "gave him alone time with a machine that he owned and controlled, even if sporadic and restricted by imposing institutional boundaries."

== See also ==
- John Doe No. 24
