= 2026 Farm Adventures rabies exposure =

2026 rabies exposure incident in North Carolina

- Disease: Rabies
- Source: Baby goats from Farm Adventures petting zoo
- Location: North Carolina, United States
- First reported: August 27, 2026
- Arrival date: July 28, 2026
- Confirmed cases: 3 animals confirmed positive, 1 presumed positive
- Suspected cases: 213 human
- Deaths: 0 (human)

The 2026 Farm Adventures rabies exposure was an event where three baby goats tested positive for rabies at Farm Adventures, a North Carolina mobile petting zoo. Local officials stated that between July 28 and August 27 of that year, the farm took the three goats to ten locations ins North Carolina. 213 people were recommended post-exposure prophylaxis after being evaluated by the state health department.

On August 29, 2026, the North Carolina Department of Health and Human Services confirmed that several goats at the Farm Adventures mobile petting zoo tested positive for rabies. The three goats were euthanized, along with a fourth suspected of having the disease.North Carolina officials stated that there was no risk to the general public, only visitors that interacted with the goats at one of ten locations. According to officials, the goats were likely infected when a skunk got into their pen in late July. The skunk was shot and burned by the farm.
