= Cherry Hospital =

Coordinates: 35.3942302°N 78.0212101°W

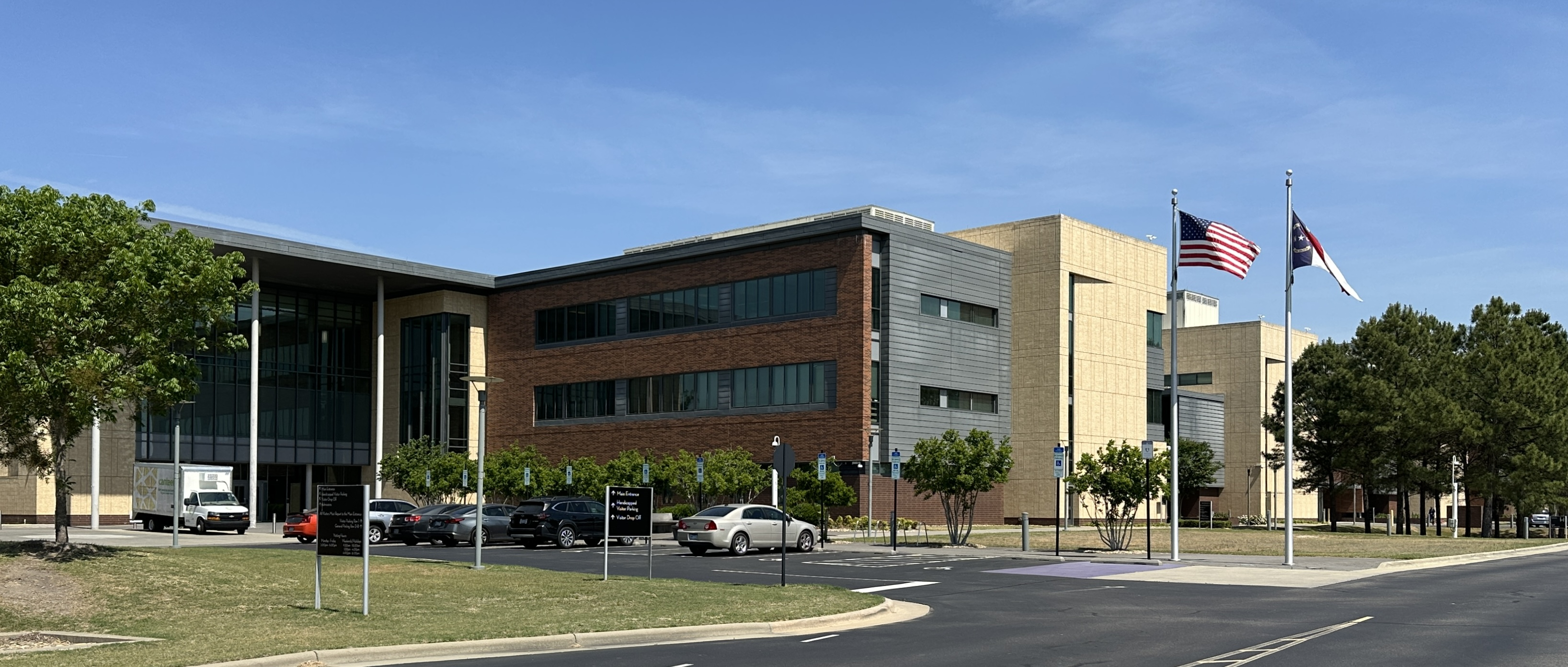
- Cherry Hospital in 2026

Geography
- Location: Goldsboro, Eastern North Carolina, North Carolina, United States

History
- Founded: 1880

Links
- Website: www.ncdhhs.gov/dsohf/cherry/
- Lists: Hospitals in North Carolina

Cherry Hospital is an inpatient regional referral psychiatric hospital located in Goldsboro, North Carolina, United States. As one of three psychiatric hospitals operated by the North Carolina Department of Health and Human Services, it provides services to 38 counties in the eastern region of North Carolina. It is part of the Division of State Operated Healthcare Facilities within the Department of Health and Human Services, which oversees and manages 14 state-operated healthcare facilities that treat adults and children with mental illness, developmental disabilities, and substance use disorders. The Division's psychiatric hospitals provide comprehensive inpatient mental health services to people with psychiatric illness who cannot be safely treated at a lower level of care.

Cherry Hospital's treatment units include Adolescent, Adult Acute Admissions, Geriatric Admissions, Psychiatric Rehabilitation, and Psychiatric Medical to serve those with complex acute care needs, providing a level of care not available in their own communities.

== History ==
In 1877, the North Carolina General Assembly appointed a committee to recommend the selection of a site for a facility for the black mentally ill which would serve the state. On April 11, 1878, 171 acres (69 ha) of land two miles (3 km) west of Goldsboro were purchased. The site was described by Governor Zebulon Baird Vance as ideal for a hospital building because of good elevation in a high state of cultivation and central location for the black population.

On August 1, 1880, the first patient was admitted to the then named "Asylum for Colored Insane". Since that time, there have been several name changes including: The Eastern North Carolina Insane Asylum, Eastern Hospital, and State Hospital at Goldsboro. The name was changed to Cherry Hospital in 1959 in honor of Governor R. Gregg Cherry, who focused his administration on expanding mental health services and increasing hospital facilities and personnel during his tenure.

The bed capacity for the hospital when established was seventy-six but over one hundred patients were crowded into the facility by Christmas of 1880. On March 5, 1881, the Eastern North Carolina Insane Asylum was incorporated and a board of nine directors appointed. A separate building was established for treating tubercular patients. In addition, a building for the criminally insane was opened in 1924.

For the first eighty-five years of its history, Cherry Hospital served the entire black population for the State of North Carolina. Patients included Junius Wilson, a deaf black man who was castrated by hospital staff after being falsely accused of sexual assault and spent almost 70 years as a patient despite not being mentally ill. In 1965, the hospital joined other state hospitals in implementing the Civil Rights Act of 1964. Cherry began serving patients from the thirty-three counties in the Eastern Region in 1965 by providing services for all races. Black patients at Cherry were transferred to hospitals in their appropriate region while Cherry received white patients from other hospitals in other regions.

=== Cherry Farm ===
From the opening of the institution, much of the cultivation was performed on the hospital grounds under the management of the steward. By 1960, Cherry Farm had 2,300 acres in cultivation, including fruit trees, an apple orchard, vegetables, and sugar cane, with livestock consisting of hogs, chickens, turkeys and cows. The farm supplied the hospital's requirement of milk, eggs, and pork (except cured bacon), 70% of the hospital's beef requirement; nothing was sold except hides.

=== Early treatment ===
The early treatment program was mainly custodial, while able-bodied patients worked on the farm. In 1884, a battery was purchased as electricity was said to be beneficial to the treatment of early insanity. An occupational therapist was employed in 1932, but therapy was mainly confined to the farm, laundry, kitchen and yard work. During the 1930s and 1940s, laxatives, castor oil, salts, aspirin, and sedatives were the standard medications given to patients. Hydrotherapy was attempted, but soon abandoned. Seclusion in the form of 6’x9’ steel cages was also utilized, but was completely removed from the treatment program in 1956. Chapel facilities and chaplain services were not available until the early 1950s, but selected patients were allowed to visit churches in Goldsboro under the supervision of an attendant.

By 1955, tranquilizing medications were widely used and helped revolutionize patient treatment. As a result of extensive use of psychotropic drugs, the rate of discharges began to increase and the length of hospitalization decreased. While discharges increased, the admission rate also increased significantly and the resident population remained virtually stable at approximately 3,000 patients between 1950 and 1965. The highest rate of occupancy was approximately 3,500 patients. During its first 100 years of service, Cherry Hospital served 91,045 patients.

Cherry Hospital highway historical marker

=== From segregation to integration ===
For the first 85 years of its history, Cherry Hospital served only the mentally ill African-American population for the entire state of North Carolina, and remained the only mental hospital available to those citizens until the mid-1960s. The hospital remained segregated until 1965, when, to comply with the Civil Rights Act of 1964, Cherry Hospital joined other state mental institutions in implementing the law, initiating the desegregation of the patient population. The state was divided into four (4) regions, with each region containing a mental hospital for adults. Cherry Hospital began to provide services to all races from the thirty-three designated counties in the Eastern Region of North Carolina. African-American patients at Cherry Hospital were transferred to hospitals within their appropriate region, while white patients designated for the Eastern Region were received and admitted from other hospitals in other regions.

Cherry Hospital cemetery memorial monument, dedicated in 2004, located on the old hospital campus

=== Cemeteries ===
There are two cemeteries located on the old campus of Cherry Hospital. One is located behind the Chase Laundry Building where patients were interred between 1905 and 1928; the other is located behind the McFarland Building where the earliest known interment is 1927. It is known that there are 3000 people buried on the grounds, with approximately 700 graves marked with upright brass crosses bearing patient names and dates. A monument in memoriam of the patients interred on the old Cherry Hospital campus was dedicated on June 3, 2004. The two known burial grounds mentioned above may account for those buried since 1905 but do not account for those buried between 1880 and 1905. It is known that there have been over 3800 people buried on the hospital grounds since 1913.

=== Dorothea Dix influence ===
The mid-nineteenth century in North Carolina marked a time of great change in the methods of caring for the mentally ill. Despite the push by other states to develop and build asylums, North Carolina continued to resist these efforts due to the high cost of construction. North Carolina was twelfth of the original 13 colonies to pass legislation allowing for the construction of a state hospital. The efforts of Dorothea Lynde Dix were of paramount importance in swaying legislators to consider the cost savings, and fundamental humanity, of treating the insane. Dix addressed the North Carolina General Assembly in 1848, petitioning the members to establish formal, humane institutional care for those suffering from mental illness. Her advocacy efforts, including those of North Carolina General Assembly Representative Kenneth Rayner, led to the beginning of construction of the first asylum in North Carolina. Only two other asylums for the mentally ill, Broughton Hospital in Morganton and Cherry Hospital in Goldsboro, were approved and built before the turn of the twentieth century in North Carolina.

A Founders Gallery exhibit, located in the first floor lobby of the New Cherry Hospital, was established to pay tribute to the influence and impact of the efforts championed by Dorothea Dix to care for the mentally ill.

== "New" Cherry Hospital ==
In the fall of 2016, the old Cherry Hospital facility closed and was replaced by a new psychiatric facility of the same name, located at 1401 West Ash Street, Goldsboro, North Carolina, on a site approximately one-half mile from the old hospital. The new hospital, designed by Perkins+Will, of Durham, North Carolina, is a single structure, three-story building containing approximately 410,000 square feet, including 9.4 acres of floor space, consisting of residential patient care units, therapy and medical facilities, and service and administrative support areas. The site, including buildings, parking lots, grounds and buffer zones, covers approximately 51 acres and is located on a 171-acre tract. The basic construction contract for the building, utilities, and grounds was awarded to Archer Western Contractors, LTD, of Morrisville, North Carolina. Total funding for the new construction, design, medical equipment, furniture, telecommunications, information technology, equipment and other necessities totaling $138,325,814 was derived from special indebtedness bonds approved by the North Carolina General Assembly.

A Groundbreaking Ceremony was held at the new site on October 1, 2010, with then Governor Beverly Eves Perdue and North Carolina Department of Health and Human Services Secretary Lanier M. Cansler in attendance. A subsequent Dedication and Official Ribbon-Cutting Ceremony was held on August 30, 2016, with then Governor Pat McCrory, North Carolina Department of Health and Human Services Secretary Rick Brajer, and Deputy Secretary Dale Armstrong in attendance.

The previous hospital, located at 201 Stevens Mill Road, Goldsboro, North Carolina, was composed of several buildings disseminated campus-wide. The new hospital provides expanded services and additional capacity encompassed in one building. Amenities include a modern laboratory, dental and radiology departments and equipment, internal and external courtyards, a treatment mall (known as the "Hope and Wellness Center") decorated with flexible pictures hung magnetically, gymnasium and exercise room, library equipped with computers, cosmetology and barber shops, and anti-ligature doors/hinges/hooks and tempered glass.

The process of transferring patients to the new hospital was initiated in late September 2016. A press release on the North Carolina Department of Health and Human Services website, dated October 5, 2016, states all patients were safely moved and now occupy the new Cherry Hospital as of Thursday, September 29, 2016.

== Counties served ==
Map indicating 38 Eastern North Carolina counties served by Cherry Hospital

Cherry Hospital serves patients from thirty-eight (38) Eastern North Carolina counties including: Beaufort, Bertie, Bladen, Brunswick, Camden, Carteret, Chowan, Columbus, Craven, Cumberland, Currituck, Dare, Duplin, Edgecombe, Gates, Greene, Hertford, Hyde, Johnston, Jones, Lenoir, Martin, Nash, New Hanover, Northampton, Onslow, Pamlico, Pasquotank, Pender, Perquimans, Pitt, Robeson, Sampson, Scotland, Tyrrell, Washington, Wayne, and Wilson.

== Services provided ==
Cherry Hospital employs licensed psychiatrists, internal and family medicine physicians, and mid-level practitioners who provide short and long term mental health care and services to adolescents, adults and geriatric patients. Comprehensive treatment includes physical and diagnostic, with utilization of an array of therapeutic approaches including group, behavior, milieu therapy, occupational, as well as recreational and creative arts therapies.

== Treatment units ==
Cherry Hospital's treatment units include:

- The Adolescent Unit is a specialty unit providing inpatient treatment for mentally, emotionally, and behaviorally disturbed adolescents between the ages of 12 and 17. The unit provides diagnostic evaluation that includes psychiatric, medical, nursing, individual and group therapy, family counseling, nutritional services, therapeutic activities, structured group living, vocational evaluation and rehabilitation, and interagency correlation. Adolescents are enrolled in a year-round accredited school program ("Riverbend School"), which allows patients to remain up-to date in their education while receiving the care they need.
- The Adult and Acute Admissions Unit is for patients between the ages of 18 and 60. It is designed for patients who are admitted in crisis and with many types of mental illness. It is a short term unit and family and community involvement is encouraged to assist with the transition back to the community.
- The Geriatric Admissions Unit provides treatment for patients 60 years and older. While most of the patients in the unit have confusion and/or disorientation associated with dementia, there are others with persistent mental illness. Although patients are usually ambulatory, many suffer from age-related physical illnesses such as diabetes, hypertension, arthritis or cardiovascular disease. Most require some assistance with their basic needs. The objective of the unit is re-motivation, reorientation, and rehabilitation of patients in an effort to return them to their community and families.
- The Psychiatric Rehabilitation Unit provides treatment and rehabilitation services to adults 18 and older with severe and persistent psychiatric illness. Efforts are aimed at reducing symptoms and developing the skills needed to achieve independent functioning. Patients participate in work therapy, Therapaws, and in counseling sessions. A wellness clinic is part of the patients' program in order to familiarize them with routine health checks and to encourage follow-up with physicians after discharge.
- The Psychiatric Medical Unit is a unit for the treatment of psychiatric patients with physical illness who cannot be managed on a general psychiatric unit due to the nature and severity of the medical illness. Patients are admitted to this unit from other hospital units.

== Riverbend School ==
Riverbend School, housed within the new Cherry Hospital facility, is an accredited school program for adolescent patients between the ages of 12 and 17. Classrooms are structured as small groups for multi-age and grade, including both regular and special education classes. Liaison teachers work with home-school personnel, parents/guardians, and staff to meet each student's individual needs.

== Expanded capacity ==
Cherry Hospital expanded its capacity by more than 100 psychiatric beds following the move to a new facility in 2016. Now, a 300-bed facility, Cherry Hospital has the capacity to serve 130+ adults, 28 adolescents, 35 geriatric, 10 medical psychiatric, and 104 psychiatric rehabilitation. There are 12 patient care units that include 228 bedrooms with one bathroom per room, 146 private bedrooms and 82 semi-private bedrooms.

== Accreditations ==
Cherry Hospital is accredited by the North Carolina Medical Society to provide Continuing Medical Education (CME) to physicians and is accredited as a provider of continuing nursing education by the American Nurses Credentialing Center's Commission on Accreditation(ANCC). The hospital provides continuing education to psychologists, social workers, and teachers by working closely with Area Health Education Centers (AHEC) Eastern AHEC, Southeast AHEC, Southern Regional AHEC, and North Carolina Psychological Association.

- The Joint Commission, 2012 Top Performer on Key Quality Measures
- North Carolina Medical Society
- American Nurses Credentialing Center's Commission on Accreditation
- College of American Pathologists
- Member, North Carolina Hospital Association

== Teaching affiliations and internships ==
Cherry Hospital is affiliated with thirteen (13) schools of nursing. Annually, these schools complete clinical rotations in various treatment areas. The objective of the clinical experience is to provide nursing students with learning opportunities regarding the care of individuals with mental health needs.

- Appalachian University
- Campbell University
- Coastal Carolina Community College
- East Carolina University
- Edgecombe Community College
- James Sprunt Community College
- Johnston Community College
- Lenoir Community College
- Sampson Community College
- University of Mount Olive
- University of North Carolina at Greensboro
- Wayne Community College
- Wilson Tech Community College

Cherry Hospital is affiliated with several colleges and universities for internship placements in the areas of social work, psychology, teaching (exceptional children), dental hygiene, pharmacy and therapeutic recreation, and has affiliations with colleges/universities in other states for occupational therapy internships. The hospital is routinely utilized as a teaching site for both the Brody School of Medicine at East Carolina University and Campbell University where psychiatry residents, fellows and medical students train with the hospital's professional staff holding clinical faculty appointments.

== Cherry Hospital Museum ==
The former Cherry Hospital Museum, located on the old hospital campus

The Cherry Hospital Museum is located in the Special Services house on the old hospital campus, located at 201 Stevens Mill Road, in Goldsboro, North Carolina. Displaying written documents, photographs and other artifacts, the museum depicts the history of the psychiatric hospital opened in 1880 for the African American mentally ill from all 100 counties of North Carolina.

Due to the damage sustained by the effects of the flooding of Hurricane Matthew in October 2016, the museum officially closed its doors on Friday, January 13, 2017. All artifacts housed in the museum were moved to storage with future plans to rotate these pieces and display them in exhibits in the Founders Gallery, located in the First Floor of the New Cherry Hospital. An electronic presentation of these artifacts will be featured on electronic message boards located throughout the new hospital.

== Cherry Foundation, Inc. ==
The Cherry Foundation is a not-for-profit and tax exempt organization established to provide further assistance to those affected by mental illness while admitted at Cherry Hospital This organization is a separate entity from Cherry Hospital and was officially recognized and chartered March 31, 1997, by the State of North Carolina, and was granted federal tax-exempt status, 501(c)(3) by Internal Revenue Service guidelines. Tax deductible contributions and gifts made to the foundation are utilized directly for the therapeutic care of the patients.
