= Sociolinguistics of sign languages =

Application of sociolinguistic principles to the study of sign languages

The sociolinguistics of sign languages is the application of sociolinguistic principles to the study of sign languages. The study of sociolinguistics in the American Deaf community did not start until the 1960s. Until recently, the study of sign language and sociolinguistics has existed in two separate domains. Nonetheless, now it is clear that many sociolinguistic aspects do not depend on modality and that the combined examination of sociolinguistics and sign language offers countless opportunities to test and understand sociolinguistic theories. The sociolinguistics of sign languages focuses on the study of the relationship between social variables and linguistic variables and their effect on sign languages. The social variables external from language include age, region, social class, ethnicity, and sex. External factors are social by nature and may correlate with the behavior of the linguistic variable. The choices made of internal linguistic variant forms are systematically constrained by a range of factors at both the linguistic and the social levels. The internal variables are linguistic in nature: a sound, a handshape, and a syntactic structure. What makes the sociolinguistics of sign language different from the sociolinguistics of spoken languages is that sign languages have several variables both internal and external to the language that are unique to the Deaf community. Such variables include the audiological status of a signer's parents, age of acquisition, and educational background (home acquisition or residence schools). There exist perceptions of socioeconomic status and variation of "grassroots" deaf people and middle-class deaf professionals, but this has not been studied in a systematic way. "The sociolinguistic reality of these perceptions has yet to be explored". Many variations in dialects correspond or reflect the values of particular identities of a community.

== Variations in sign languages ==
=== Variation between sexes ===
In the Irish deaf community, there are several basic lexical items that are unintelligible between men and women. The vocabularies used by men and women are so different that they have affected communication. The reason for variation was the creation of two sex-segregated schools for the deaf. In this case sociolinguistic variation has been caused by isolation and segregation as implemented by the educational institution. These sex differences have had an effect on behavior in that they perpetuate gender images and relations. The means in which institutionalized language socialization is occurring in Ireland is and has been changing drastically over the past 50 years. This in turn is changing the way Irish sign language is being used and developed.

=== Ethnicity ===
In Black American Sign Language (Black ASL), there is linguistic variation which helps define individuals as members of both the Black community and Deaf community. However, issues arise from the existent double immersion in the two communities. Speakers, dependent on their language background, will identify themselves more strongly with either the ethnic or Deaf identity. The primary identity of the Black Deaf community is the Black community, but those born deaf in deaf families also identify with the Deaf community. The Black Deaf community is distinct from both the black and deaf communities. Black ASL as a sociolinguistic variant of ASL is distinctly Black. Speakers of Black ASL do code-switch to ASL when speaking with people outside the Black community. This sociolinguistic variation is what defines the Black Deaf community.

=== Variations driven by contact ===
Children who go to hearing schools are faced with the need to learn to read and write the spoken language. Just like situations involving spoken languages having greater dominance over other languages, deaf people live in societies that are dominated in every aspect by hearing people and their values. Most deaf people are bilingual to some extent in a spoken language, while hearing people are not bilingual in sign languages. However, in Martha's Vineyard there was a greater degree of deafness than compared to the national average; 1 in 155 people were deaf. This encouraged hearing people to learn sign language in order to communicate with more people in the community. In Martha's Vineyard, much of the community, even hearing people, was using a sign language known as Martha's Vineyard Sign Language due to the high ratio of deaf people. The large population of deaf people in this community is an instance where deaf people are individuals within the entire community and not distinctly part of a Deaf ethnic group. The extent of bilingualism in ASL and spoken English allowed for code switching from spoken to sign when in a group where most people were deaf.

== Dialect contact leading to standardization ==
The advent of videophones has made it easier for members of the Deaf community to communicate with each other throughout the nation. Videophones allow members of the Deaf community to more easily interact with each other and to interact with people outside the Deaf community with the help of interpreters. The interpreters have to go through training programs and thus learn a standardized form of ASL. This is in contrast to the vernaculars of members of the Deaf community that did not attend these residential schools. Historically, residential schools for the deaf were a huge proponent of the standardization of ASL as children would attend schools for the deaf and learn classes in ASL. However, recently there has been a shift to send deaf children to hearing schools where they learn standard American English and actually have no formal instruction in ASL. Thus, interpreters are exposed to more standardized variants of ASL, whereas members of the Deaf community are more likely to learn home signs and nonstandard version of ASL. The interpreters therefore try to incorporate the Deaf consumers' signs into their interpretation, but this is not always possible to do so. Statistically, it seems interpreters have a strong resistance to incorporating signs into the conversation that were seen as non-ASL. This leads to some exposure of standardized signs from the interpreter to the Deaf callers, but also leads to less use of regional signs by the interpreters, aiding with the standardization of ASL.

== Contact between spoken and sign languages ==
=== Contextualization strategies ===
Communication strategies are used in language with both adults and children in situations with different degrees of formality. Two common strategies are connecting-explaining and chaining. Chaining is a technique to connect texts such as a sign, a print, a written word, or a fingerspelled word. Explaining by examples is important for interpreters to understand and master in order to produce voice-to-sign interpretations that are closer to native signs and are comprehendible to Deaf users of ASL. The setting and audience changed the manner of speech of the interpreters. In an informal situation with adults, brief explanations tend to be used, and in formal settings, the appropriate terms and jargon tend to be used, and chaining is uncommon, if not totally absent, in adult settings. Communication strategies to support comprehension have been attributed to language directed at children (mostly within the classroom), but also appear within the language directed at adults across different settings and degrees of formality.

=== Fingerspelling ===
The manner of speech changes based on the audience. Speakers tend to change the proportions of different elements of ASL; the degree of codeswitching is based on audience. For children, to help them understand new topics, fingerspelling is used. Fingerspelling is essentially an English event. This is additional evidence that shows how spoken language influences ASL. The contact of sign languages and spoken languages affect the acquisition of sign language as well as the method of teaching sign language to children. In a study where a child at age two began fingerspelling, the child invented a name for her doll at 30 months. The child recognized lexicalized forms which were fingerspelled but she did not necessarily understand the same words when they were just fingerspelled. This shows that fingerspelling is an important component of language acquisition as a bridge between spoken languages and sign languages.
