= John Doe No. 24 =

Unidentified American

- John Doe No. 24, photographed in 1945 by the Illinois Department of Human Services
- Born: c. 1929
- Died: November 28, 1993 (aged around 64); Peoria, Illinois, U.S.
- Other name: John Doe Boyd (legal name)

John Doe No. 24 (born c. 1929, died November 28, 1993), later known as John Doe Boyd, was the temporary name given to a deaf and later blind man who was institutionalized in Illinois for over 40 years after being found wandering the streets of Jacksonville in 1945. Unable to communicate his identity due to his disabilities, he was classified as a John Doe and committed to state care, where he was eventually given the name John Doe Boyd by state officials. He spent 30 years at the Lincoln Developmental Center, and was transferred several times, eventually to a senior center in Peoria. Musician Mary Chapin Carpenter wrote a song about him, 'John Doe No. 24', which was released after his death. His life is covered by the biography God Knows His Name: The True Story of John Doe No. 24 by journalist David Bakke.

== Life ==
In the early morning hours of October 11, 1945, two police officers found a black teenager wandering on the streets of Jacksonville, Illinois. He was quickly determined to be deaf and unable to communicate. Upon asking why he was wandering the streets, he could only write "Lewis", which is believed to be his name. No information could be found about him or his relatives. As such, a judge placed him in the Illinois mental health system, where he became known as John Doe No. 24. His name was granted based on him being the 24th unidentified man registered in the Illinois mental health system. His name was later legally changed to John Doe Boyd in 1978 to allow him to apply for Social Security.

After spending years in mental health institutions, during which he slowly became blind, Boyd was transferred to the Smiley Living Center in Peoria in 1987. He died of a stroke on November 28, 1993, at the estimated age of 64.

== Legacy ==
When American singer Mary Chapin Carpenter learned of Doe's life, she purchased a tombstone and placed it over his unmarked grave. Carpenter also wrote a song titled "John Doe No. 24" on the album Stones in the Road which was released in October 1994.

== Books ==
- Bakke, D.; Carpenter, M.C. (2000). God Knows His Name: The True Story of John Doe No. 24. Southern Illinois University Press. ISBN 978-0-8093-2327-2.

== See also ==
- Junius Wilson
