= Structural priming =

Linguistic concept

Structural priming is a tendency to repeat or more easily process a sentence that is similar in structure to a previously presented prime. For example, passive sentences like "the cat was chased by the dog" are less likely to be produced relative to active sentences like "the dog chased the cat". But if one has heard a passive sentence like "a thief was seen by a guard", then the likelihood of producing the passive sentence is increased. Kathryn Bock first characterized this psycholinguistic phenomenon in 1986 and it is referred to by various names such as Syntactic Priming or Syntactic Repetition. Structural priming appears to depend on the abstract syntactic structures and can be isolated from overlap in words or meanings. Unlike semantic priming, it seems to persist over time and processing of other sentences. It occurs in language development and also cross-linguistically.

== Eliciting structural priming ==
Several paradigms exist to elicit structural priming.

Picture description

Bock introduced a picture description task to investigate this phenomenon. In the study phase, at their own pace, participants read a list of sentences and observe a set of pictures. All these pictures describe events including an agent, patient, and theme. Half of the agents pictured are humans and the other half inanimate objects. This phase of the experiment was performed in an attempt to establish a "recognition memory" cover story. In the test phase, participants are asked to read a sentence expressing one of four conditions:

- Transitive active: George kicked the ball
- Transitive passive: The ball was kicked by George
- Dative double-object: George gave the boy the ball
- Dative prepositional phrase: George gave the ball to the boy

After reading a sentence, the participant repeats it. Following this repetition, the participant describes the picture.

Results of picture description

Consider a trial wherein the participant is reading a dative double-object construction, George gave the boy the ball. The subject is then significantly more likely to describe the a picture as X gave Y the Z instead of X gave the Z to Y. This persistence in sentential form is structural priming.

== Theory of structural priming ==
At least four theories exist to explain structural priming: syntactic repetition; thematic congruency, derivation of subjects, and error-based learning.

Syntactic repetition

In the Bock study, the sentences presented match their primes in syntactic structure. This is trivially true for any type-type prime. However, other structural priming patterns exist that complicate this explanation.

Thematic congruency

A structure known as the unaccusative, which is unmarked morphologically in English, is capable of priming passive transitive sentences. The two constructions differ in syntax, but in both cases the subject takes a thematic, or at least non-agentive, thematic role.

- Unaccusative: The parcel arrived
- Passive Transitive: The parcel was sent by the post

Because the two constructions have this property in common, it has been suggested that such a thematic relational mapping is what allows structural priming.

Derivation of subjects

A second possibility for describing the presence of unaccusative-passive priming is their shared characteristic of having a derived subject. For instance, the passive subject is said by some scholars of syntax to be derived via movement, or "smuggling," from the same position where it is generated in the active, to wit, the complement of the transitive verb. Though the derivation of the unaccusative does not seem to be an identical process, it is nevertheless assumed to be derived.

Error-based learning

Another explanation is that syntactic priming is a form of implicit learning supported by a prediction error-based learning mechanism.
