= Lenox Baker =

American orthopedic surgeon and athletic trainer

- Born: November 10, 1902
- Died: June 2, 1995 (aged 92)
- Occupation: Secretary of North Carolina Department of Health and Human Services

Lenox Dial Baker Sr. (November 10, 1902 – June 2, 1995) was an American orthopedic surgeon and athletic trainer at both Duke University and University of Tennessee. The Lenox Baker Children's Hospital at Duke is named in his honor. He graduated from the Duke University School of Medicine, where he was later a professor.

He was the first director (later secretary) of the North Carolina Department of Human Resources (later renamed the North Carolina Department of Health and Human Services).

Baker was inducted into the North Carolina Sports Hall of Fame in 1983.
