= National Youth in Care Network =

Non-profit, charitable organization in Canada

Youth in Care Canada (formerly known as the National Youth in Care Network) is a non-profit, charitable organization driven and staffed by youth and alumni from the child welfare system in Canada. The organization represents the opinions and concerns of youth in and from state care and increases awareness about the needs of these youth through research publications and speaking engagements. Youth in Care Canada provides support for youth in and from child welfare care, advocates for the improvement of services, and guides the development of youth in care networks. The National Youth in Care Network was founded in November 1985 by seven young people in and from care. Today, it is the only national constituency-driven and consumer-focused organization in the child welfare sector. The National Youth in Care Network is the longest-running national child welfare organization in Canada, and the oldest national youth-directed organization in Canada. The organization adopted the trade name Youth in Care Canada in 2010.

== History ==
The seven founding members of the National Youth in Care Network were Lisa H., Carleen J., Caroline M., Twila M., Alix R., Troy R., and John T. These young people from across Canada were living in government care when they met at an international child welfare conference in Vancouver, British Columbia in November 1985 and proposed the establishment of a national network for youth in care. In its early days, the National Youth in Care Network was called the Youth to You Network and was a project of the Canadian Child Welfare Association. The National Youth in Care Network was officially incorporated as an independent non-profit organization on December 4, 1990.

== Constituency ==
Any interested individuals and organizations may become members of the National Youth in Care Network, but only those members from the child welfare system between the ages of 14 and 24 have voting privileges. The organization is governed by a board of directors, at least half of whom are young alumni in or from child welfare care and between the ages of 18 and 24, and the remainder being alumni from care over the age of 24.

== Support ==
Youth in Care Canada provides training and support to individuals wanting to establish and develop local youth in care networks. To date, the organization has assisted in the development of over 70 provincial and community-level youth in care networks in Canada. Youth in Care Canada administers the Ken Dryden Scholarship which assists youth who are currently or formerly in the care of the Canadian child welfare system to complete an undergraduate university degree. The organization also provides social service programming in the areas of networking, advocacy, and sensitivity training.

== Research and Advocacy ==
Youth in Care Canada publicizes national standards for child welfare care and reviews Canada’s progress in meeting these standards. The organization promotes awareness of the needs of children and youth in and from care by conducting participatory action research and producing publications. Youth in Care Canada advises on public policy, provides consultation to child welfare professionals, and advocates on specific issues important to youth in care such as education, the use of pharmaceutical drugs in the system, transition into adulthood, and family violence. Using multimedia storytelling, YouTube videos, public presentations, and printed publications, the network endeavours to inform government and the public on the experience of living in the child welfare system and transitioning to adulthood.
