= Constructed action and dialogue =

Constructed action and constructed dialogue are pragmatic features of languages where the speaker performs the role of someone else during a conversation or narrative. Metzger defines them as the way people "use their body, head, and eye gaze to report the actions, thoughts, words, and expressions of characters within a discourse". Constructed action is when a speaker performs the actions of someone else in the narrative, while constructed dialogue is when a speaker acts as the other person in a reported dialogue. The difference between constructed action and constructed dialogue in sign language users is an important distinction to make, since signing can be considered an action. Recounting a past dialogue through sign is the communication of that occurrence so therefore it is part of the dialogue whereas the facial expressions and depictions of actions that took place are constructed actions. Constructed action is very common cross-linguistically.

== Constructed action ==
Constructed action is common in many languages when telling stories or reporting the actions of others. During a narrative, the speaker not only reports the actions of others but performs them as well. The actions performed are not the exact actions of the person but an action constructed by the speaker. Liddell gives the example of a speaker patting their pockets when talking about someone having lost their keys. Since the speaker has not lost their own keys, the only reason they would pat their pockets would be to illustrate the story they are telling. The addressee then understands these actions not as the speaker's but of a character within the story.

In sign languages across the world constructed action is used in a similar way, but is limited in the sense that communication must be continued with the individual's hands. Those who use sign language will still have their hands telling the story, but the rest of their body and face will be expressing the actions of another individual in the story. Often the constructed action is said to start with a break in eye contact and then the shifting of the signer's body. The constructed action in sign language also adds more information to the story being told in the sense that the words being signed will give a part of the story while the rest of the body and face will tell a reaction or some other component about the individual the story is about. Due to the added meaning from these bodily movements, constructed action is described as symbolic in sign language. Those who have learned American Sign Language show similar physical motions when using constructed action despite the differences in their education, as well as constructed action not being taught as a standard component in the sign language.

Signers do not always define their extra body motions as constructed action, but the similarities to the term's definition as well as the function of the movements connects the two ideas together. The constructed actions are able to convey information in a faster and more efficient way than if they were to be signed out, and are useful for faster relay in information. Because of this, constructed action is seen as a way to overcome the impairment that deaf individuals face and simply streamlines their communication much like people attempt to in spoken language.

== Constructed dialogue ==
Constructed dialogue is when a speaker assumes the role of a character in the discourse. It often includes role-shifting, directed gaze, and body movement. For example, in American Sign Language, a speaker may utilize constructed dialogue by shifting their body to denote different characters and directing their gaze to particular points. The signs produced are then understood as the signing of the character, not of the speaker themselves.

Constructed dialogue is used in storytelling, when a speaker recounts the words of another to an audience. Speakers will signal that they are retelling "by changing head and body orientation, as well as gaze direction." Verbal cues like "I said," "I was like," and "he goes," are also used to signal that the speaker is retelling an occurrence. Stories are constructed dialogue by themselves, because there is still the act of retelling the story which means it will be altered to some degree by the story teller. Constructed dialogue is also common in gossip, and is often begun with words such as : "Oh" "Like" and "Uh". While used in gossip, constructed dialogue influences how others will interpret the third-party being referenced. Because of this, how someone uses constructed dialogue can cause an array of effects to the third-party. For example, the third-party group may be avoided from that point on, or they may even be interacted with more. Constructed dialogue does can be used positively, negatively or anywhere in between.
