= North Carolina Department of Health and Human Services =

State government agency

- Logo of the North Carolina Department of Health and Human Services

Agency overview
- Formed: 1971
- Jurisdiction: State of North Carolina
- Headquarters: 1915 Health Services Way Raleigh, NC 27607
- Employees: 18,000
- Annual budget: $38 billion
- Agency executive: Devdutta Sangvai, Secretary
- Website: www.ncdhhs.gov

The North Carolina Department of Health and Human Services (NCDHHS) is a state government agency in the U.S. state of North Carolina.

The NCDHHS has more than 18,000 employees. The NCDHHS has its origins in the former North Carolina Department of Human Resources (DHR). The head of NCDHHS (Secretary) is appointed by the governor of North Carolina, confirmed by the North Carolina Senate, and is a member of the North Carolina Cabinet in the executive branch of the North Carolina government. The NCDHHS was created in 1971.

== Divisions and programmatic offices ==
Among its divisions and programmatic offices are:

- Aging
- Child and Family Well-Being
- Child Development And Early Education
- Disability Determination Services
- Employment and Independence for People with Disabilities
- Health Benefits (NC Medicaid)
- Health Service Regulation
- Mental Health, Developmental Disabilities and Substance Use Services
- Office of Economic Opportunity
- Office of Minority Health and Health Disparities
- Office of Rural Health
- Public Health
- Services for the Blind
- Services for the Deaf and Hard of Hearing (DSDHH)
- Social Services
- State Operated Healthcare Facilities

== List of secretaries ==
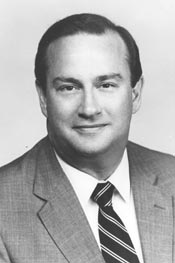
Charles Robin Britt Secretary (1993–97)

The following is a list of NCDHHS secretaries:

- Lenox D. Baker, 1972–73
- David Flaherty, 1973–76
- Phillip J. Kirk, Jr., 1976–77
- Sarah T. Morrow, 1977–85
- Lucy H. Bode, 1985
- Phillip J. Kirk, Jr., 1985–87
- Paul Kayye, 1987
- David Flaherty, 1987–93
- Charles Robin Britt, 1993–97
- H. David Bruton, 1997–2000
- Carmen Hooker Odom, 2001–07
- Dempsey Benton, 2007–09
- Lanier Cansler, 2009–12
- Albert Delia, 2012–13 (acting)
- Aldona Wos, 2013–15
- Rick Brajer, 2015–16
- Mandy Cohen, 2017–21
- Kody H. Kinsley, 2022-2024
- Devdutta Sangvai, 2025-present

== Programs ==
- North Carolina LINKS Program

== History ==
=== Department of Human Resources (1971-97) ===
The NCDHHS has its origins in the former North Carolina Department of Human Resources (DHR). The DHR was created in 1971 as an umbrella to consolidate what had been more than 300 free-standing state agencies. It was activated as a functional agency on December 10, 1971. The first Secretary of Human Resources, Dr. Lenox Baker, was appointed by Governor Robert W. Scott.

The Division of Public Health, an original part of the department, was taken out of the DHR in 1989. Most of its functions were transferred back to the DHR in 1997, when the agency was renamed the Department of Health and Human Services.

=== Medicaid system and abuse policy (2004-10) ===
In April 2004, NCDHHS awarded Affiliated Computer Services (ACS) a contract to replace the existing Medicaid Management Information System operated by Hewlett Packard Enterprise Services. ACS was to complete the design by the summer of 2006, though the contract was terminated in July 2006 for delays. ACS filed a lawsuit against the state for wrongful work termination, and the civil court case was settled in January 2007, with ACS agreeing to install an additional software suite to help Medicaid generate savings. Two years later NCDHHS again attempted to replace their Medicaid computer system, awarding a $265 million contract to Computer Science Services in January 2009, with an August 2011 deadline for putting the system live.

An incident at NCDHHS psychiatric hospitals in 2009 attracted media attention, when a patient at Cherry Hospital was left in a chair for 24 hours before dying. Lanier Cansler was appointed as Secretary of NCDHHS shortly afterwards. One of his first actions was to create a zero-tolerance policy for patient abuse. A year later, former house co-speaker Richard T. Morgan filed an ethics complaint against Cansler, alleging a conflict of interest when Cansler awarded a no-bid HHS contract to one of his former lobbying clients, Carolinas Center for Medical Excellence. The claim would be dismissed early the next year.

In 2009 and 2010, state regulators found that companies were billing for never performed care in the state Medicaid system, prompting the state General Assembly to change the criteria for patients to be eligible for Medicaid's personal care services. On September 8, 2010, Disability Rights North Carolina wrote an open letter to the Department of Justice and Centers for Medicare & Medicaid Services, stating that despite thousands of individuals being referred to in-home PCS (Personal Care Services) since April 1, "relatively few" individuals had received care since, despite NCDHHS' code dictating that "assessments and patient notification should occur within 14 days." On November 4, 2010, WRAL published a report that delays in the NCDHHS Medicaid program had "people waiting weeks or months for care," with one elderly double-amputee still waiting to receive state-funded in-home care after five months. Disability Rights North Carolina further reported that people were dying as they waited to be assessed for services. Explained WRAL, "the state tried to rid the system of fraud and abuse, but the result has been that those who aren't trying to take advantage of the system are unintentionally penalized."

=== Vetoes and budget cuts (2011) ===
The state budget for the division overseeing Medicaid was around $3 billion by 2011. In July 2011, Republican lawmakers in North Carolina overrode three of Governor Bev Perdue's vetoes, including her veto of the budget bill for the state, making the S781 measure into law. Medical Malpractice Reform S33 and Medicaid/Health Choice Provider Requirement S496 were also both passed into law. The vetoes met with a fair degree of controversy both politically and in the press. About one of the passed laws, WRAL wrote "federal rules require Medicaid to be managed by a single state agency. S496 would give the final say in Medicaid appeals to an administrative law judge, not to NCDHHS, the agency administering the grant. Democratic critics of the bill said the change could provoke federal officials to withhold some or all of the state's Medicaid money, but Republicans countered that if it did, NCDHHS could suspend that part of the statute while seeking a waiver from the feds."

As a result of the vetoes, Republican lawmakers passed a $19.7 billion state budget that dictated cutting $356 million in state Medicaid funding by April 2012, with a provision requiring NCDHHS to make their own budget changes to achieve the cut. In August 2011, Cansler announced that NCDHHS would find it "next to impossible to achieve this budget," noting that the relatively long federal approval process for budget cuts might make the April 2012 deadline untenable. Cansler explained that without legislative approval of cuts granted in a timely manner, to meet the deadline NCDHHS would "have to make additional reductions," including potentially cutting services defined as "optional" such as podiatry, dental care, organ transplants and hearing aids. To allow input on what to cut, Cansler made North Carolina Medical Care Advisory Committee meetings public.

=== Budget shortfall and cuts (2011) ===
By October 2011, NCDHHS was facing a projected $139 million budget shortfall for Medicaid, partly because of "other agency liabilities that weren't paid for in the spending plan." NCDHHS argued that the legislature's dictated budget cuts hadn't taken into account a $300 million accounting error from 2008, and also hadn't noted that "the state also must repay $42 million after a federal audit found personal care services were either billed improperly or had inadequate documentation from providers." Among other problems, NCDHHS also stated that some of the requested cuts were illegal according to Medicaid's federal rules, and could endanger millions in federal revenue. Also, a slow approval process for changes from the Centers for Medicare and Medicaid Services was projected to interfere in actually implementing the cuts before the state's deadline.

After creating a list of potential NCDHHS budget cuts for the General Assembly, on October 27, 2011, Cansler wrote a letter to Governor Perdue, arguing that forced NCDHHS cuts to meet the shortfall would be "devastating" to patients and health care providers in North Carolina. In response, House Speaker Thom Tillis argued the shortfall was the fault of NCDHHS for not communicating, stating "a lot of those cuts were made in consultation with the secretary and the Department of Health and Human Services. Obviously, if we'd been consulted by them and they said they weren't possible to begin with, (the cuts) wouldn't have been in there." Cansler, however, argued the nature of the cuts had been explained in two letters from the governor to the committee, dated in May and June. According to NCDHHS, in October, several lawmakers "publicly pledged to help fill the shortfall," eyeing the state's at the time $150 surplus to help. Stated representative Nelson Dollar at the time, "we are not going to cut services, and we are not going to cut rates to make up for one-time liabilities."

=== Medicaid IT delays, shortfall patch (2011-12) ===
In late 2011, NCDHHS revealed ongoing problems with the state's contract to refurbish the Medicaid billing system. In particular, the state's 2008 contract with Affiliated Computer Services (ACS) had faced two year delays, with the budget running from $287 million to $495 million. All but about 10% of the contract was paid with federal, not state, dollars. Cansler stated the delays were due to constantly changing federal guidelines, requiring constant system redesign. A performance audit of NCDHHS released on January 10, 2012, found problems with oversight of the Medicaid system's development. Among other budgetary missteps, the audit claimed that the computer system had been altered after final approval, leading to unexpected changes in the software.

Despite the General Assembly's response to the Medicaid budget shortfall in October 2011, over the following months money was not indicated by lawmakers as available except through the governor's office, leaving NCDHHS the choice of either "large-scale rate cuts or the elimination of some optional services". NCDHHS announced in December 2011 that it might cut adult services like hospice care and mental health care. As a result, the press reported that disabled but mentally sound North Carolinians could be institutionalized or made homeless. Reimbursements for physicians were also put on the cutting block, though as of January 2012, the federal government had approved less than half of the 54 rate cuts proposed by NCDHHS. At the time the press described a growing "political fight" on how to fill the budget hole, with "no signs of a solution". Officials estimated the Medicaid shortfall could grow to US$243 million by the end of the year.

On January 13, 2012, Cansler resigned from his role as secretary of NCDHHS, giving a two-week warning. Governor Perdue named Al Delia, her senior policy advisor, as acting secretary of the department in early February. At the time, Cansler stated in interviews that he had grown frustrated with the "political contest" over funding in the state legislature. Early in 2012, legislators passed a patch for the Medicaid shortfall. That year, the Medicaid program was estimated to have a $13 billion budget in state and federal funds.

=== Personal care crisis (2012) ===
As of April 2012, North Carolina stood to "lose $414 million in federal funding" over conflicts with the federal government on the regulations for allocating funding for personal care services. The North Carolina Association of Long Term Care Facilities asserted that if the conflicts were not resolved, "30,000 people could be 'put out on the street'." A federal deadline to fix the problem was initially set for May 1. On April 4, federal regulators gave "tentative approval" to NCDHHS' proposal, giving the state until the end of 2012 to implement fixes to personal care services. The new plan, according to NCDHHS, made most applicants eligible for long-term care, though some "4,000 people who now receive services in long-term care facilities will have to find alternative arrangements."

NCDHHS implemented the new computer system NC Fast in May 2012, an integrated case management system that replaced the 19 legacy computer systems previously used to deliver social service benefits. A limited version of the system was first tested that month in Guilford County, with state implementation to take place later. NCDHHS fired Craigan L. Gray, the head of the state Medicaid program, in June 2012. In October 2012, the state governor had $20 million shifted from other NCDHHS departments to fund adding 6,300 pre-kindergarten slots for at-risk toddlers.

In October 2012, it was projected that "more than 11,000 disabled people in group or adult care homes will no longer qualify for the services through Medicaid as of Jan. 1 because the state considers them functional enough to live without them." A special session on the group home funding was held in November 2012, called by house speaker Thom Tillis "to fix a budget gap that could cause about 2,000 people with mental illnesses and developmental disabilities to lose their homes." Wrote WRAL, "the crisis was triggered in July when the Republican-controlled legislature approved a one-word tweak to the state budget that excluded group homes from a nearly $40 million fund intended to cushion the effects of Medicaid eligibility changes for programs for the disabled."

=== New cabinet hires and NC Fast (2013) ===
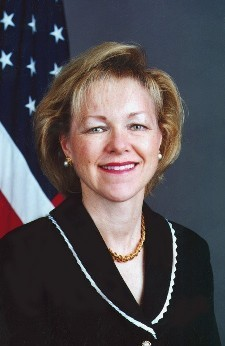
Aldona Wos

On January 4, 2013, North Carolina Governor-elect Pat McCrory swore in Aldona Wos as Secretary of the North Carolina Department of Health and Human Services. At the time, NCDHHS had around 18,000 employees and a budget of around $18 billion. Wos declined her $128,000 salary and was instead paid a token $1. A new performance audit of the Department of Health and Human Services for 2012 was released on January 31, 2013. The audit criticized NCDHHS for its lack of record keeping and management concerning various funds, among other budgetary problems. Wos released her responses to the audit, agreeing on all points with the auditor, including the conclusion that NCDHHS had consistently exceeded budgeted amounts for administrative costs due to lack of oversight.

When speaking to the General Assembly in February 2013, Wos laid out her department priorities as "Medicaid and information technology." In July 2013, NCDHHS went live with its NCTracks system for managing Medicaid billings. Also that month, after three years in development NCDHHS oversaw the statewide rollout of NC Fast, a new system meant to manage the state's food stamps. Two months later, state food banks reported that NC Fast had developed a significant backlog, with North Carolina residents turning to the food banks as a last resort. Media criticism focused on Accenture, the company contracted to build the system. Accenture had previously run into budget issues with other contracted state systems.

Federal authorities began investigating NCDHHS for signs of wrongdoing in relation to work agreements in July 2013 from as early as 2006, with Wos and NCDHHS announcing their cooperation. In September 2013, Wos attracted criticism in the press for NCDHHS pay hikes, as well as a number of department hires that other employees perceived as underqualified. Wos defended the work contracts, arguing the higher rates were an effort to attract talent and avoid turnover, and that the hires were "an integral part of our effort to deliver more efficient, effective services." Under Wos, NCDHHS expanded its audit team in August from 6 to around 30. Wos was questioned at a state legislative hearing in October 2013, with lawmakers addressing higher salaries, severance payments, and her stated plan to reform Medicare in state.

=== Backlog resolution (2014) ===
In early 2014, NCDHHS dealt with a backlog of duplicate food stamp applications in the NCFast system, with many people waiting over a month for benefits. The backlog reached about 24,000 cases by January 18. On January 23, the USDA threatened to withhold $88 million in administrative funding for the state's food stamp program unless the backlog was promptly dealt with. The first deadline was set as February 10, and required the resolution of the "longest-delay cases." County agencies at NCDHHS met the deadline "by working nights and weekends, hiring temporary staff and diverting staff from other program areas." An end of March deadline was given for fixing the entire backlog. Though NCDHHS initially gave assurances it could meet the March deadline as well, on March 11, Wos told lawmakers that it would be difficult to resolve the outstanding 1,975 backlogged cases before March 31.

On March 25, Wos announced that NCDHHS was on track to meet the March deadline, excluding that Guilford County had just revealed 8,100 cases that hadn't been entered in computers or NCTrack. Wos argued the rate which NCDHHS' cut down on the backlog, however, showed "that [NCFast] works and it works very well." The state sent 22 workers to help Guilford County clear the cases before the March 31 deadline. In July 2014, the press revealed that in March, "the staff of the Guilford County [NCDHHS had been] instructed not to enter information into NC FAST in order to hide a case backlog from the [USDA]."

=== Surplus, Brajer hired (2015-16) ===
Throughout 2013 and early 2014, NCDHHS worked to resolve glitches with the NCTracks Medicaid billing system. The department announced the system was working "effectively" by July 204. The state's Medicaid program ended 2014 with a $130 million surplus, a contrast to the usual deficit held by the department. Despite the surplus, Wos stated that she was "disappointed" that the state elected not to move forward with her proposal to reform the state's Medicaid program. By 2015, NCDHHS had announced that the glitches from both NCTTracks and NC Fast were resolved, and Wos had "[convinced] the legislature of the need to invest in the state’s medical examiner system."

Wos resigned on August 15, 2015, stating in a press conference that it was "simply time to go home" and spend time with her family. Asked by the press if she would "change any of the decisions that she made over a sometimes rocky tenure," she replied "not at all." Wos was replaced by Rick Brajer, a former medical technology executive. After being sworn in, Brajer asserted to the press that Wos' resignation had been unrelated to the ongoing federal investigation into NCDHHS.

In October 2015, NCDHHS introduced their Medicaid 1115 waiver, which petitioned federal Medicaid authorities to change the state system to a "capitized" billing process, where doctors bill a set per-patient fee as compared to billing for specific medical items. At the time, the state was the "largest state that has not moved from a fee-for-service system to capitated payment." Medicaid was running about $185 million below budget at the time of the proposal. Brajer was praised for the development from lawmakers such as Senator Tommy Tucker, who had previously been vocal in criticizing the department. Tucker also stated "I don’t want us to minimize the effort of these folks and the previous secretary in the reform of the department.... [that effort] has allowed us to look at $200 or $300 million in surplus."

=== Mandy Cohen: the Opioid epidemic, GenX in drinking water, and the COVID-19 pandemic (2017-22) ===
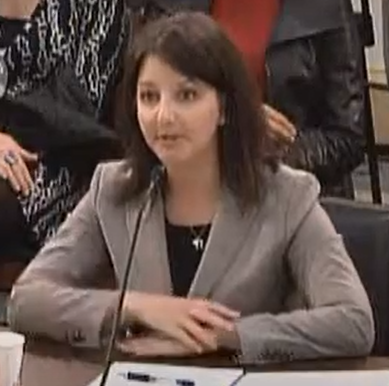
Mandy Cohen

In January 2017 Mandy Cohen was appointed Health Secretary of the Department by Governor Roy Cooper. She dealt with multiple health crises in North Carolina including the Opioid epidemic, GenX in drinking water, and the COVID-19 pandemic.

Cohen navigated the political divide over Medicaid in North Carolina, with Democratic governor Cooper wanting to expand it under the Affordable Care Act and the Republican-majority North Carolina State Legislature opposing such measures. The Department led North Carolina through a transition from free-for-service Medicaid to a model contracted by the state with private insurance companies that are paid pre-determined rates to provide health services. Healthy Opportunities was created, an initiative testing the impact of providing high-need Medicaid enrollees with housing, food, transportation, and interpersonal safety interventions with the goal of improving public health and reducing costs. The initiative was funded with $650 million from state and federal Medicaid, authorized by the Centers for Medicare and Medicaid Services. She implemented the Opioid Action Plan, which uses $45.5 million in grant funding to fight opioid misuse in the state. The plan also updated the Controlled Substance Reporting System, helping doctors identify patients at risk of misusing opioids. The plan led to a decline in overdose deaths in North Carolina for the first time in over a decade. In 2019 Cohen criticized the North Carolina House of Representatives' proposed budget for 2019–21, arguing that it harmed North Carolinians by making massive cuts to the Department of Health and Human Services, potentially impacting "everything from health inspections of restaurants to the safety of drinking water to child protective services." Governor Cooper announced on November 30, 2021, that Cohen would leave office on January 1, 2022.

==== COVID-19 pandemic ====
Cohen stressed the need for North Carolinians to wear face masks, practice social distancing, and wash their hands in order to prevent the spread of COVID-19. In March 2020 she sent a letter to the president of the 2020 Republican National Convention, asking for detailed plans on how the convention would operate during the COVID-19 pandemic after President Donald Trump published a series of tweets threatening to pull the convention out of North Carolina. The Department announced the creation of up to 300 testing sites in North Carolina, active through July, and requested more supplies from the federal government. On June 30, 2020, the Department announced that it would partner with Omnicare, a company owned by CVS Health, to administer tests to 36,000 nursing home residents and 25,000 nursing home employees in over 400 locations.

In the beginning of July, Cohen warned of people becoming desensitized to the data being collected about COVID-19. She said that she had concerns about teacher safety if schools were to re-open amidst the pandemic, but was confident in studies showing that the virus has minimal health consequences on younger children, saying that schools "have not played a significant role in the spreading of COVID-19." She met with William L. Roper, president of the University of North Carolina, to discuss how to resume in-person instruction for students at North Carolina's public colleges and universities. Earlier that month, during a press conference, she had called the virus a "serious threat". She warned of the state possibly returning to a stay-at-home order. She had also linked North Carolina's rise in cases with the reopening of the state. Cohen indicated that there would be a test surge in areas with troubling metrics.
