= U.S. Route 117 =

Highway in the United States

U.S. Highway 117
- US 117 highlighted in red

Route information
- Auxiliary route of US 17
- Maintained by NCDOT
- Length: 114 mi (183 km)
- Existed: 1932–present

Major junctions
- South end: Port of Wilmington
- US 421 in Wilmington; US 17 / US 76 in Wilmington; US 74 in Wilmington; I-40 in Wilmington; US 13 / US 70 in Goldsboro; I-42 near Goldsboro
- North end: US 301 near Wilson

Location
- Country: United States
- State: North Carolina
- Counties: New Hanover, Pender, Duplin, Wayne, Wilson

Highway system
- United States Numbered Highway System; List; Special; Divided; North Carolina Highway System; Interstate; US; State; Scenic
← NC 116	→ NC 118

U.S. Route 117 (US 117) is a north–south United States Highway located completely within the state of North Carolina. A spur route of US 17, the highway runs for 114 miles (183 km) from the Port of Wilmington, south of downtown Wilmington, to US 301 near Wilson. From its southern terminus, US 117 runs along Shipyard Boulevard and College Road, concurrent with North Carolina Highway 132 (NC 132) through Wilmington. US 117 intersects the eastern terminus of Interstate 40 (I-40) and parallels the interstate until reaching Faison, passing through Burgaw, Wallace, and Warsaw. The highway diverges from I-40 in Faison, running north-northeast through Mount Olive, Goldsboro, and Pikeville to its northern terminus. US 117 meets the southern end of I-795 in Goldsboro, and parallels that route before reaching its northern terminus at US 301 south of Wilson.

The general alignment of US 117 was originally signed as NC 40, one of the original North Carolina State Highways running from Fort Fisher to the Virginia state line. Upon the creation of the United States Numbered Highway System in 1926, US 17-1 was assigned concurrent with NC 40 from Wilmington to Virginia. US 17-1 was decommissioned in 1932 and US 117 was established, running from Conway, South Carolina to Wilson via Myrtle Beach and Wilmington. In 1939, US 17 and US 501 replaced US 117 between Conway and Wilmington, truncating the southern terminus to Downtown Wilmington. US 117 has undergone several realignments since 1940, some of which have created special routes of US 117. In 2003, the southern terminus of US 117 was adjusted again, rerouting the highway along College Road and Shipyard Boulevard to the Port of Wilmington. Between 2006 and 2007, US 117 was routed onto a new freeway between Goldsboro and US 264 in Wilson. The freeway was subsequently renumbered as I-795 and US 117 was placed on its original routing north of Goldsboro. A southerly extension of I-795 from Goldsboro to I-40 is planned along the US 117 corridor.

== Route description ==
As the entire route is located within the U.S. state of North Carolina the North Carolina Department of Transportation (NCDOT) is responsible for maintenance along the entirety of US 117. NCDOT measures average daily traffic volumes along many of the roadways it maintains. In 2019, average daily traffic volumes along US 117 varied from 1,400 vehicles per day near Watson Road in Wayne County and Great Swamp Loop in southern Wilson County to 56,500 vehicles per day alongside the University of North Carolina Wilmington in Wilmington. US 117 is a part of National Highway System, a network of highways in the United States which serve strategic transportation facilities, in two segments. The southern terminus of the first segment is located at the Port of Wilmington in Wilmington and the northern terminus is at Holly Shelter Road in Castle Hayne. The southern terminus of the second segment is located at the intersection with US 117 Connector near Calypso and the northern terminus is located at an interchange with US 13 and US 70 in northern Goldsboro. When it is not a part of the National Highway System, US 117 makes connects to it at Interstate 40 (I-40) near Wallace and Warsaw, at North Carolina Highway 24 Business (NC 24 Bus.) in Warsaw, and at US 301 near Wilson.

=== Wilmington to Wallace ===
US 117 begins at the Port of Wilmington at an intersection with River Road. The highway runs eastward along Shipyard Boulevard a four-lane divided highway. US 117 intersects US 421 at Carolina Beach Road and continues along Shipyard Boulevard for 2.7 miles (4.3 km) until reaching North Carolina Highway 132 (NC 132) at South College Road. At the intersection, US 117 turns to the north, running concurrently with NC 132. South College Road is a six-lane highway from Shipyard Boulevard to Wilshire Boulevard, with two northbound lanes, three southbound lanes, and a central turning lane. US 117 and NC 132 meet US 17 and US 76 at an intersection with Oleander Drive. Following South College Road, the highway makes a slight bend to the northeast before widening to a six lane divided highway and intersecting Wilshire Boulevard. Access to the University of North Carolina Wilmington (UNCW) is provided at intersections with Hurst Drive, Crews Drive, and Randall Parkway/Randall Drive. North of New Centre Drive, US 117 and NC 132 makes a slight turn to the northwest, before meeting US 17 Business at a partial cloverleaf interchange with Market Street.

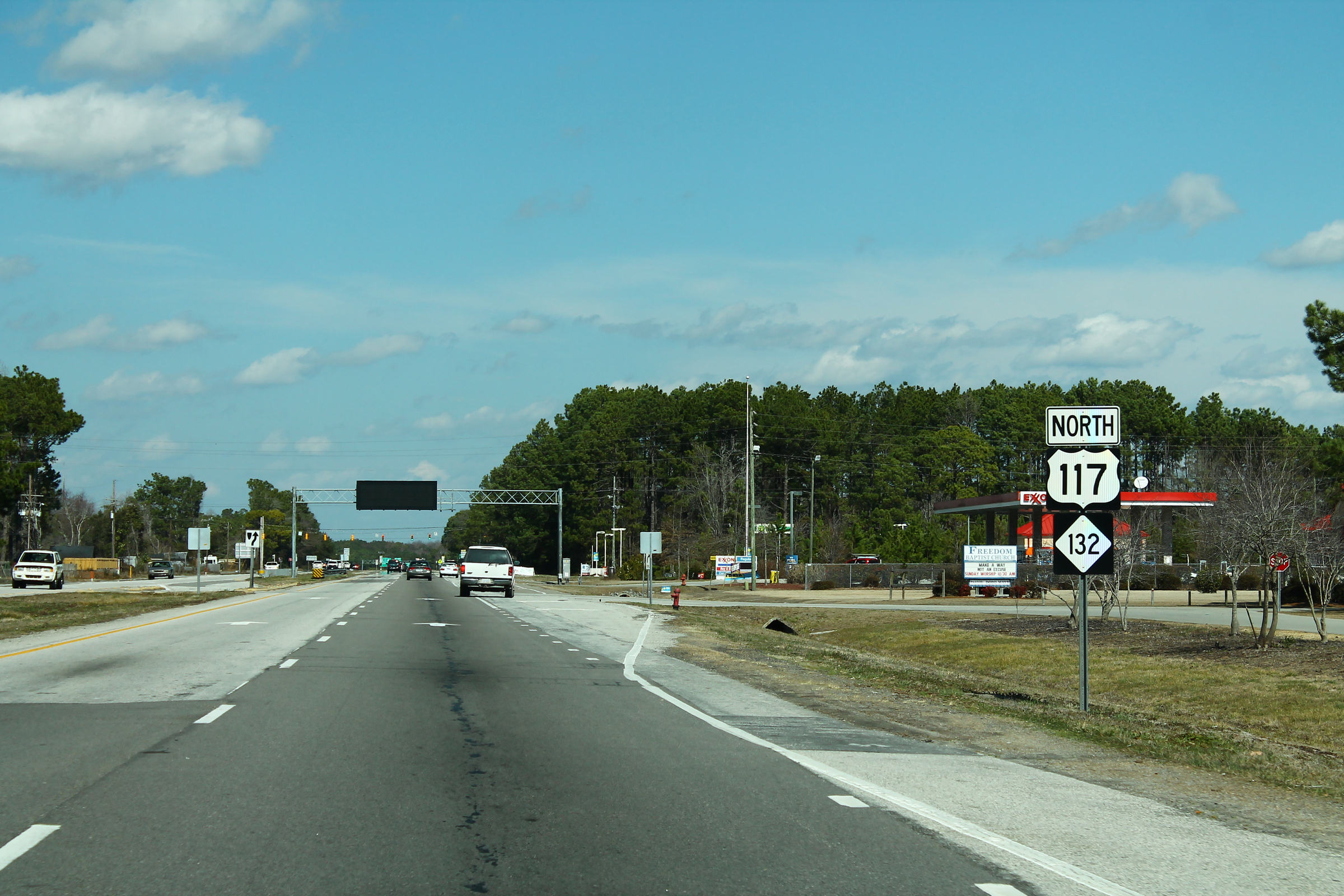
US 117 running concurrently with NC 132 through Kings Grant

North of Market Street, the road name switches from South College Road to North College Road. The highway meets US 74 at an intersection with Martin Luther King Jr. Parkway along the Wilmington city limits. North of the intersection, the highway runs through the community of Kings Grant before meeting the eastern terminus of I-40. The northbound lanes of US 117 run concurrently with I-40 for 0.52 miles (0.84 km) until reaching exit 420B. The southbound lanes utilize an on-ramp to the freeway and run concurrently with I-40 for 0.2 miles (0.32 km) at its eastern terminus.

North of I-40, US 117 and NC 132 follow northwestward along North College Road, a four-lane divided highway. The highway narrows to a two-lane road north of an intersection with Murraysville Road. The highway utilizes an overpass to cross over I-140 but does not connect with the Interstate. Access to the North Campus of Cape Fear Community College is provided by utilizing Blue Clay Road, which intersects US 117. The highway crosses a railroad branch owned and operated by CSX Transportation. US 117 intersects NC 133 at a roundabout south of Castle Hayne. The roundabout marks the northern terminus of NC 132, while NC 133 follows US 117 to the north. US 117 and NC 133 passes through downtown Castle Hayne before crossing the Northeast Cape Fear River and entering into Pender County. North of the bridge, the highway briefly runs adjacent to the river, before reaching an intersection that marks the point where the US 117 and NC 133 overlap ends. US 117 travels north for 3.6 miles (5.8 km) until intersecting NC 210 in Rocky Point.

The highway exits Rocky Point to the north and is routed to the east of the communities of Ashton and St. Helena. South of Burgaw, US 117 Business splits from the mainline route at Walker Street. US 117 widens to a two-lane road with a central turning lane as it continues as a bypass of downtown Burgaw. The U.S. highway meets NC 53 in a retail area, northeast of downtown Burgaw. US 117 continues 0.2 miles (0.32 km) northwest of NC 53 before reaching the northern terminus of US 117 Business at Timberlake Drive. The central turning lane ends at the US 117 Business intersection and the highway continues north of Burgaw along a two lane highway. Entering into a rural area of Pender County, US 117 makes a turn to the northeast north of the terminus of Old Savannah Road and subsequently crosses over I-40. US 117 runs to the east of I-40 for 5.7 miles (9.2 km) before meeting the Interstate at a diamond interchange (I-40 exit 390) south of Wallace. The highway briefly becomes a four-lane undivided road at the interchange but narrows to two-lanes on either side. US 117 meets NC 11 0.4 miles (0.64 km) northeast of I-40. NC 11 runs concurrently with US 117 for 2.4 miles (3.9 km) to the northwest until reaching the outskirts of Wallace. North of the NC 11 intersection, US 117 is renamed as Norwood Street, and enters Wallace from the south. The highway becomes a four-lane undivided road south of Medical Village Drive and runs through the central business district of Wallace. US 117 intersects NC 41 at East Main Street in downtown Wallace. Exiting Wallace to the north, US 117 narrows to a two-lane road north of Stallings Road.

=== Wallace to Calypso ===
Beginning in downtown Wallace, US 117 begins to parallel the W&W Subdivision railroad, owned and operated by CSX Transportation. The W&W Subdivision is a former part of the historic Wilmington and Weldon Railroad. US 117 enters into a residential area on the eastern side of Teachey and travels east of the downtown area. A central turning lane is added to the roadway at Rosemary Road and continues as US 117 continues north. The highway enters Rose Hill from the south, running along Sycamore Street. Southeast of downtown Rose Hill, US 117 intersects Charity Road which provides access to Greenevers and I-40. The roadway widens to a four-lane undivided roadway between Charity Road and Ridge Street. North of Ridge Street, the roadway narrows to a two-lane road. US 117 exits Rose Hill to the north and runs through a rural area between Rose Hill and Magnolia. Approaching Magnolia from the south, US 117 widens to a four-lane undivided roadway. The highway travels through central Magnolia and meets NC 903 at an intersection with Main Street. As the highway progresses north, the roadway narrows to two-lanes at Pickett Street and leaves Magnolia. US 117 travels 3.3 miles (5.3 km) north of Pickett Street before meeting I-40 and NC 24 at a folded diamond interchange (I-40 exit 369). The highway continues to the north, paralleling the railroad to the east. The highway enters into Warsaw along Pine Street and runs through a residential area south of downtown. US 117 meets NC 24 Business and NC 50 at an intersection with College Street. The intersection marks the southern end of the concurrency between US 117 and NC 50. Both highways run to the north along Pine Street and exit Warsaw.

North of Warsaw, US 117 primarily runs through a rural area until reaching Faison. The highway briefly runs through the community of Bowdens, located between Warsaw and Faison. US 117 and NC 50 enter into Faison along Center Street. On the southern side of the town, the highway begins to make a gradual turn to the northeast. US 117 intersects NC 403 and NC 50 in the downtown area of Faison. NC 50 turns west to run concurrently with NC 403, marking the northern end of the US 117 and NC 50 concurrency. The highway completes its northeastern turn as it exits Faison, paralleling both the railroad and US 117 Connector located to the north. Nearing Calypso, the highway widens to a four-lane divided highway and makes a turn to the north. US 117 crosses over the railroad and runs along the western side of Calypso. The highway then makes a turn to the northwest and meets US 117 Connector at an intersection. At the intersection, US 117 turns to the northeast, following the four-lane divided highway toward Mount Olive.

=== Calypso to Wilson ===
North of the intersection with US 117 Connector, US 117 follows a four-lane divided highway to the north. The highway is routed to the west of Mount Olive but provides access to the town through several intersecting roads. US 117 meets NC 55 at a diamond interchange north of downtown Mount Olive. The interchange marks the beginning of a freeway which US 117 follows for 7.8 miles (12.6 km). Two interchanges, at Country Club Road and Oberry Road, are located between Mount Olive and Dudley. US 117 is routed to the west of Brogden, and no interchanges provide access to the town. North of Brogden, US 117 meets US 117 Alternate at an at-grade intersection, marking the end of the freeway. The U.S. highway continues north, intersecting US 13 east of Mar-Mac. US 13 runs in concurrency with US 117 from the intersection until northern Goldsboro.

US 117 turns to the northeast, crossing the Neuse River to the south of Goldsboro. The highway lanes briefly split and US 117 intersects NC 581 at Arrington Bridge Road. NC 581 begins to run concurrently along US 117 and US 13 to the north. Beyond NC 581, the highway makes a turn from the northeast to a slightly northwestward direction. It meets the southern terminus of US 117 Business at George Street which continues toward downtown Goldsboro. Beginning at the intersection, US 117 runs along the western side of the downtown area of Goldsboro. US 117 and US 13 diverge from NC 581 at an intersection in western Goldsboro. NC 581 continues north, providing access to the southern terminus I-795 via. NC 581 Connector. Turning to the northeast, US 117 and US 13 begin to run along a freeway outside of downtown Goldsboro. The highway has an interchange with Ash Street before meeting US 70 and US 70 Business at an interchange with Grantham Street. US 70 runs in concurrency with US 117 and US 13 to the east along the freeway. At an incomplete trumpet interchange, US 117 exits the freeway and follows a four-lane divided highway to the north. Beginning at the interchange, the highway once again begins to parallel a railroad operated by CSX Transportation. US 117 meets the northern terminus of US 117 Business at an intersection with William Street. The U.S. highway turns northward to follow William Street. On the outskirts of Goldsboro, US 117 meets Interstate 42 at an interchange and begins to parallel I-795 as it continues to the north.

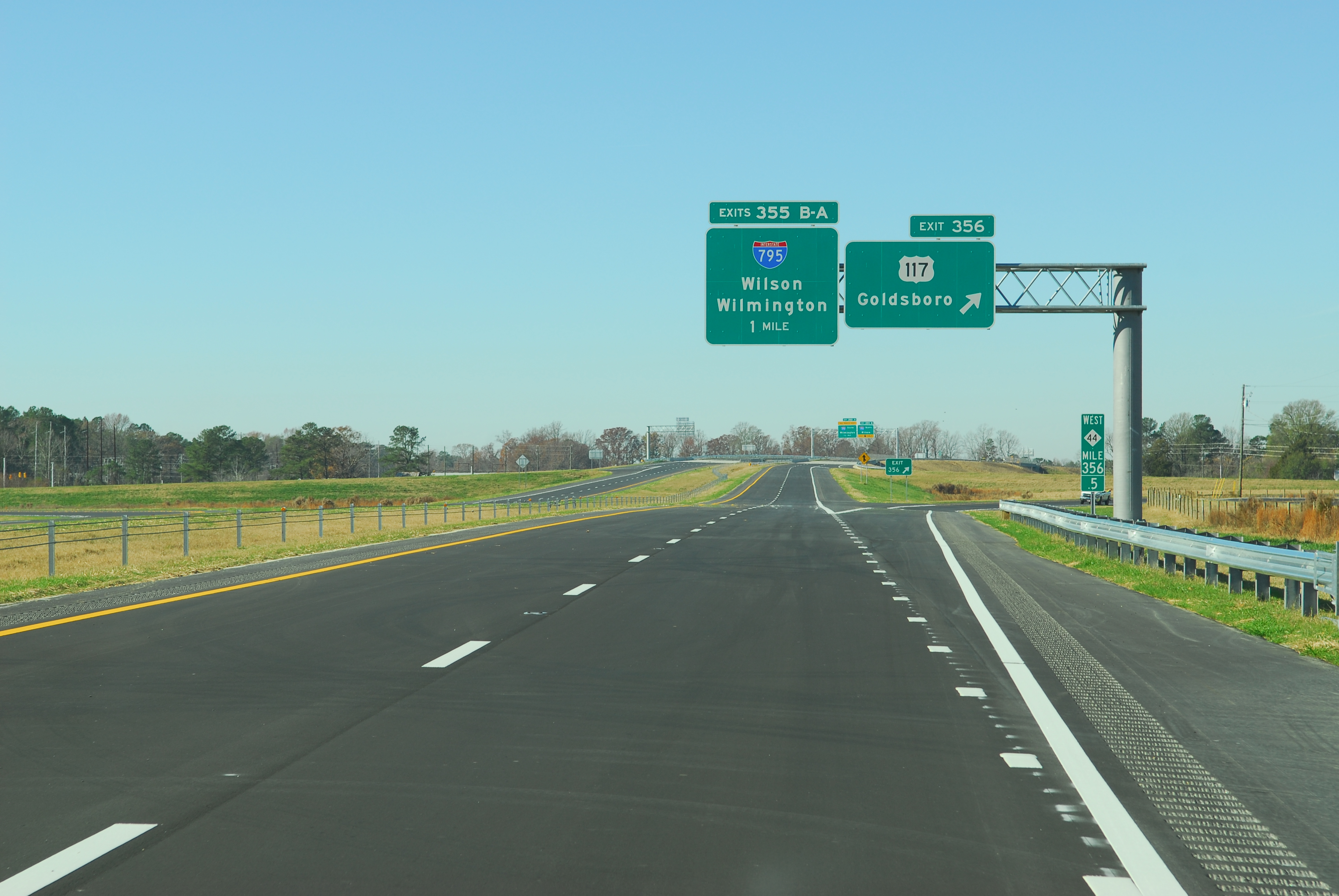
Exit signage for US 117 along NC 44 (now I-42) in northern Goldsboro

Exiting Goldsboro to the north, US 117 runs north along a two-lane highway toward Pikeville. The highway provides access to Wayne Executive Jetport through an intersection with Airport Road. Entering into Pikeville from the south, US 117 runs along Goldsboro Street and runs through downtown. In the central business district of Pikeville, US 117 intersects Main Street, which runs west to I-795. North of Pikeville, the highway makes a reverse curve, crossing over the railroad it runs parallel with. The highway enters Fremont from the south, running along Wilson Street. US 117 meets NC 222 at Main Street. The highways run concurrently for 0.09 miles (0.14 km) between Main Street and Carolina Street. At Carolina Street, NC 222 turns to the west toward Kenly. US 117 turns slightly further northward and exits Fremont. The highway diverges from the railroad while still running roughly along a similar alignment. North of Fremont, US 117 primarily runs through rural areas of Wayne County and Wilson County. The highway is routed to the west of Black Creek. Nearing its northern terminus, US 117 makes a slight turn to the northwest crossing over a pair of railroad tracks operated by CSX Transportation. North of the railroad, the highway makes a gradual turn westward. US 117 reaches its northern terminus at an intersection with US 301 south of Wilson. The terminus lies between I-795 freeway and the I-587 and US 264 freeway, both of which have interchanges with US 301.

== History ==
A transportation corridor between Wilmington and Wilson was established in 1840 with the completion of the Wilmington and Weldon Railroad. The railroad generally followed the US 117 corridor from Wilmington to Wilson, running through Wallace, Warsaw, Mount Olive, and Goldsboro. The railroad then continued northeast, generally following the US 301 corridor to Weldon. A 1916 commission proposed a system of state highways in North Carolina, consistent with the Federal Aid Road Act of 1916. Among this proposed system was a highway generally running along the railroad from Wilmington to Wilson, via. Kenansville and Goldsboro. The highway then continued further north to Halifax and Roanoke Rapids, before eventually ending at the North Carolina-Virginia state line. Much of the road was unimproved at the time. The only improved section was in New Hanover County.

=== Predecessor highways ===
North Carolina Highway 40
- Location: Fort Fisher–VA state line
- Length: 204 mi (328 km)
- Existed: 1921–1935

Upon the creation of the North Carolina State Highway System in 1921, the route between Wilmington and Virginia was assigned as NC 40. NC 40 began in downtown Wilmington and ran northeast to Castle Hayne. The highway ran through Burgaw and was routed to the east of both Wallace and Teachey. While approaching Kenansville, the highway did not enter the town limits. West of the town, it turned to the west and was routed to Warsaw where it met NC 24. In Warsaw, the highway turned to the north until reaching Faison where it turned to the northeast. NC 40 ran through Mount Olive and Dudley before reaching Goldsboro. North of Goldsboro, NC 40 ran to the north, intersecting NC 22 southwest of Wilson. NC 40 then turned to the northeast, running through Wilson, Rocky Mount, and Halifax. North of Halifax, the highway turned to the northwest, following the Roanoke River to Roanoke Rapids. The highway crossed the river near Roanoke Rapids and continued northwest to the Virginia state line. Three sections of the highway were paved in 1924. These sections were between Wilmington and Burgaw, Warsaw and Goldsboro, and Fremont and Elm City. Much of the remaining route was either a gravel, sand, or topsoil road. Only the section between Roanoke Rapids and the Virginia border remained unimproved in 1924.

By 1926, NC 40 was rerouted north of Roanoke Rapids to run along an unimproved road to the northeast toward Pleasant Hill. The highway met NC 481 in Pleasant Hill and turned to the north until reaching the Virginia state line. Additionally, the highway was predominantly paved by 1926, with the exception of a segment between Halifax and Weldon, and between Roanoke Rapids and Pleasant Hill. Upon the creation of the United States Numbered Highway System, US 17-1 was assigned along the entirety of NC 40 between Wilmington and Virginia. By 1929, NC 40 was extended south from Wilmington to Carolina Beach. US 17-1 was not extended south alongside NC 40. US 17-1/NC 40 was rerouted north of Weldon in 1930. The new route followed the former alignment of NC 481 through Garysburg before running north to the Virginia state line. NC 481 was rerouted to follow the former alignment of NC 40 between NC 48 south of Rosemary to US 17-1/NC 40 in Pleasant Hill.

=== Establishment ===
US 117 was established in 1933 beginning at US 701/South Carolina Highway 38 (SC 38) to US 301 southwest of Wilson. US 17-1 was replaced by US 117 between Wilmington and Wilson, while US 301 replaced the highway between Wilson and Petersburg, Virginia. Beginning in Conway, the highway ran concurrently with SC 38 to the southeast, running through Socastee, South Carolina to Myrtle Beach. In Myrtle Beach, US 117 turned to the northeast to follow SC 49 until reaching the North Carolina state line. In North Carolina, the highway followed concurrently with NC 30 to Wilmington. The highway generally followed modern-day US 17, running through Shallotte, Supply and Bolivia before crossing a toll bridge into Wilmington. In Wilmington, the highway turned to the north to follow NC 40 along the former alignment of US 17-1. In Castle Hayne, US 117 used Old Bridgesite Road to cross the Northeast Cape Fear River. The highway continued north through Burgaw, Warsaw, and Goldsboro until reaching its northern terminus at US 301/NC 22 southwest of Wilson.

US 17 was rerouted to replace US 117 between Wilmington and Myrtle Beach in 1935, with the remainder to Conway becoming part of US 501. As a result, the southern terminus of US 117 was moved to US 17 at Market Street in downtown Wilmington. The same year, NC 40 was decommissioned in favor of overlapping U.S. Highways. This marked the end of the US 117/NC 40 concurrency. US 117 was placed on a new routing between Wallace and Warsaw in 1940. The new routing ran through Wallace and Magnolia before entering Warsaw from the south. The former alignment of US 117 between Wallace and Kenansville became part of NC 11, while the section between Kenansville and Warsaw removed a concurrency with NC 24.

=== Realignment and upgrades ===
Between 1949 and 1953, US 117 was placed onto its modern-day crossing of the Northeast Cape Fear River north of Castle Hayne. In 1951, US 117 was rerouted onto a bypass along the western side of Goldsboro. The former alignment of US 117 along George Street, Ash Street, and William Street became US 117A. The highway was rerouted onto another bypass east of Burgaw in 1952. The new routing used the current alignment of US 117 around the downtown area. The former alignment through downtown Burgaw became US 117A. A bypass of Mount Olive and Calypso was constructed in 1960, with the former route becoming US 117 Business.

The southern terminus of US 117 was adjusted on September 11, 1969. The highway was removed from its routing along Third Street in downtown Wilmington. Instead, it was routed to cross the Isabel Stellings Holmes Bridge. Beyond the bridge US 117 turned to the south and ended at US 421/NC 133 in Brunswick County. In August 1973, the southern terminus was adjusted slightly to the north. Instead of turning south after crossing the Isabel Stellings Holmes Bridge, US 117 continued west along a former secondary road to US 421. The Mount Olive and Calypso bypass was extended north in November 1988, bypassing Dudley and Brogden to the west. US 117 was subsequently removed from its routing through the town and placed onto the new bypass, which is its current routing. US 117 Business decommissioned and the former route of US 117 between Calypso and Brogden became US 117 Alternate.

In February 2003, the northern terminus of US 117 was adjusted with the completion of a new freeway along the south side of Wilson. The pre-2003 alignment of US 117 at its northern terminus followed modern-day Dorothy Lane and Lattice Road to US 301. With the new construction, US 117 was rebuilt to turn to the west before reaching US 301. US 117 was subsequently routed concurrently with US 301 to the north until reaching US 264. At US 264, US 117 turned to the west, following the freeway to its new northern terminus at I-95. On March 19, 2003, the southern terminus of US 117 was moved from US 421 in Brunswick County to the Port of Wilmington. South of Castle Hayne, the highway was removed from its concurrency with NC 133 along Castle Hayne Road and the Isabel Stellings Holmes Bridge. US 117 was rerouted to run along College Road along a concurrency with NC 132. The highway then diverged from College Road at Shipyard Boulevard which it followed until reaching the port.

As early as 1993, North Carolina State Highway maps indicated a proposed freeway bypass of US 117 running between Goldsboro and Wilson. Upon its completion in September 2006, US 117 was rerouted to follow the new freeway. The US 117/US 301 concurrency was eliminated and the US 117/US 264 concurrency was shorted to 4.3 miles (6.9 km). The former alignment of US 117 through Goldsboro, Pikeville, and Fremont became US 117 Alternate. Trucks larger than 48 feet (15 m) were not allowed to utilize the new freeway. The Surface Transportation Assistance Act of 1982 specifies that trucks over 48 feet (15 m) in length can utilize only Interstate Highways and specific routes approved by the state. As a result, the North Carolina Department of Transportation (NCDOT) sought approval from the American Association of State Highway and Transportation Officials (AASHTO) to sign the freeway as I-795. The original application to AASHTO detailed that US 117 would run concurrently with I-795 for its entire length. The request was initially denied, as the freeway connected with US 264 before connecting with I-95. North Carolina appealed the decision, and on October 12, 2007, the Federal Highway Administration designated I-795 along the freeway between Goldsboro and I-95. The highway was officially re-designated as I-795 on April 22, 2009. US 117 was shifted onto its former alignment through Goldsboro and Pikeville, ending at its modern-day northern terminus at US 301.

In July 2017, NCDOT awarded a contract to ST Wooten to build two interchanges along US 117 at Country Club Drive and Oberry Road. The project is part of a larger project to improve US 117 to Interstate Highway standards between I-40 and Goldsboro. The project was completed in the spring of 2020.

== Future ==
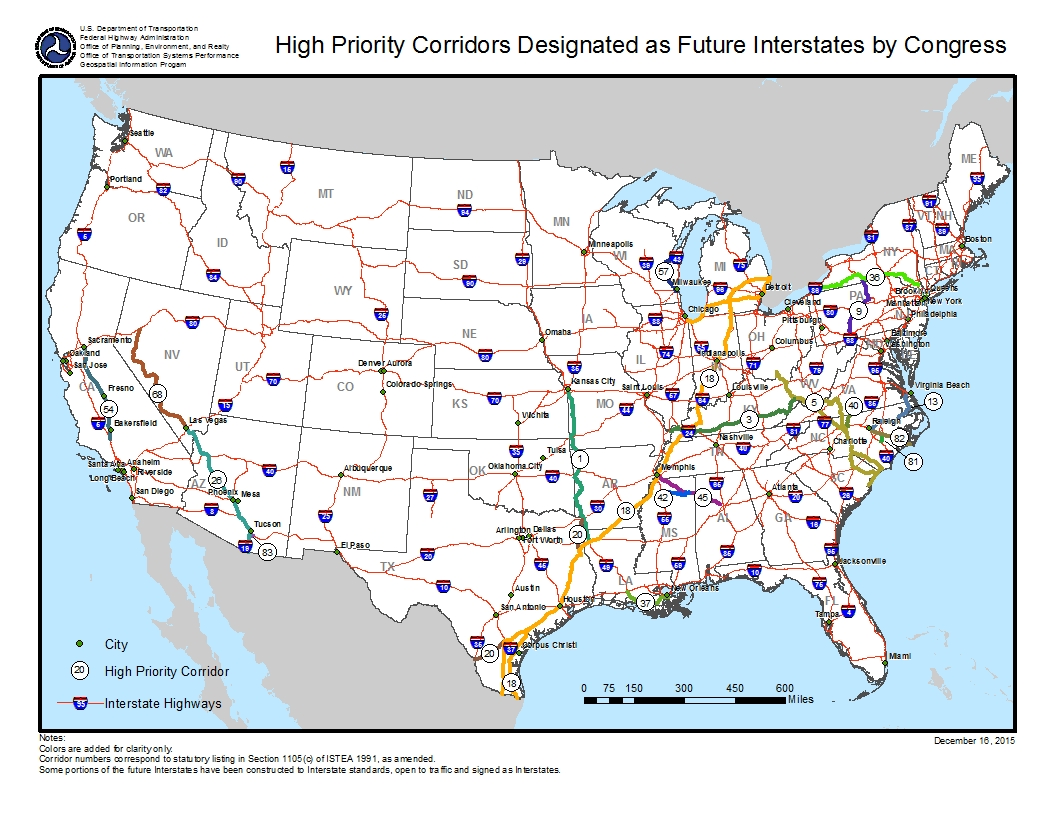
US 117 between Calypso and Goldsboro is listed as a Future Interstate as High Priority Corridor 81 (seen on the above map).

NCDOT is planning to improve roughly 24 miles (39 km) of US 117 between I-40 in Sampson County and I-795 in Goldsboro to Interstate Highway standards. The segment is proposed as a southern extension of I-795 and is listed as Federal High Priority Corridor 81. As of December 19, 2020, four of the six project segments are currently funded in the 2020-2029 State Transportation Improvement Projects (STIP). Initial public meetings for the project occurred in November and December 2019. Right of way acquisition between Country Club Road and Genoa Road in Wayne County is expected to begin in 2024. In 2028, right of way acquisition will begin between Genoa Road and I-795.

The Wilmington Urban Area Metropolitan Planning Organization (WMPO) plans for four projects to occur along US 117 in New Hanover County. Project U-5792 and U-5881 would convert College Road (US 117/NC 132) to a freeway between I-40 and Oriole Drive. The project would include the construction of three new interchanges, at Kings Drive, US 74 (Martin Luther King Jr. Parkway), and Ringo Drive. Additionally, the interchange at US 17 Business (Market Street) would be redesigned. Construction of the US 74 interchange (Project U-5792) is expected to begin in 2026. The remainder of the project (Project U-5881) is expected to begin right of way acquisition in 2029. Project U-5704 would redesign the College Road (US 117/NC 132) and Oleander Drive (US 76) intersection and install access management between Shipyard Boulevard (US 117) and Wilshire Boulevard. The project is expected to begin right-of-way acquisition in 2029. A similar access management project (Project U-5702A) would install access management along College Road between Shipyard Boulevard and New Centre Drive.

== Major intersections ==
County	Location	mi	km	Destinations	Notes
New Hanover	Wilmington	0.0	0.0	Shipyard Boulevard/River Road – Port of Wilmington	Southern terminus
New Hanover	Wilmington	0.8	1.3	US 421 (Carolina Beach Road) – Carolina Beach, Clinton	
New Hanover	Wilmington	3.6	5.8	NC 132 south (College Road) – Carolina Beach	South end of NC 132 overlap
New Hanover	Wilmington	4.2	6.8	US 17 / US 76 (Oleander Drive) – Wrightsville Beach, Wilmington, Whiteville	
New Hanover	Wilmington	6.9	11.1	US 17 Bus. to US 74 east (Market Street) – Wrightsville Beach, Jacksonville	Partial cloverleaf interchange
New Hanover	Wilmington	7.5	12.1	US 74 (Martin Luther King Jr Parkway) – Wrightsville Beach, Wilmington (Downtown), Whiteville	
New Hanover	Wilmington	8.6	13.8	I-40 begins	East end of I-40 overlap
New Hanover	Wilmington	8.8– 9.2	14.2– 14.8	Gordon Road	Northbound interchange, I-40 exit 420A
New Hanover	Wilmington	8.8– 9.2	14.2– 14.8	I-40 west – Benson, Raleigh	West end of I-40 overlap; Signed as exit 420B (westbound) and exit 420 (eastbound)
New Hanover	Castle Hayne	14.5	23.3	NC 132 ends / NC 133 south (Castle Hayne Road) – Wilmington	North end of NC 132 and south end of NC 133 overlap
Pender		17.4	28.0	NC 133 north – Currie	North end of NC 133 overlap, to Moores Creek National Battlefield
Pender	Rocky Point	21.0	33.8	NC 210 – Currie, Hampstead	
Pender	Burgaw	28.3	45.5	US 117 Bus. north (Walker Street)	
Pender	Burgaw	29.6	47.6	NC 53 (Jacksonville Highway) – Jacksonville	
Pender	Burgaw	29.9	48.1	US 117 Bus. south (Timberly Lane)	
Pender		35.1	56.5	Camp Kirkwood Road – Watha	
Pender		39.1	62.9	I-40 – Benson, Wilmington	I-40 exit 390
Pender		39.6	63.7	NC 11 south – Willard	South end of NC 11 overlap
Duplin	Wallace	42.0	67.6	NC 11 north – Kenansville	North end of NC 11 overlap
Duplin	Wallace	43.5	70.0	NC 41 (Main Street) – Harrells, Chinquapin	
Duplin	Rose Hill	49.7	80.0	To I-40 / Charity Road – Greenevers	
Duplin	Magnolia	55.2	88.8	NC 903 (Main Street) – Delway, Kenansville	
Duplin	Magnolia	58.9	94.8	I-40 / NC 24 – Wilmington, Benson	I-40 exit 369
Duplin	Warsaw	62.6	100.7	NC 24 Bus. (College Street) – Clinton, Kenansville	
Duplin	Warsaw	63.3	101.9	NC 50 south (Memorial Drive) – Kenansville	South end of NC 50 overlap
Duplin	Bowdens	66.9	107.7	Bowdens Road	To Duplin County Airport
Duplin	Faison	71.2	114.6	NC 50 north / NC 403 (Main Street) – Clinton	North end of NC 50 overlap
Duplin	Calypso	74.1	119.3	US 117 Alt. north (Fourth Street)	
Duplin	Calypso	74.5	119.9	US 117 Conn. south to I-40 – Clinton	
Wayne	Mount Olive	79.2	127.5	NC 55 – Newton Grove, Kinston	
Wayne		81.0	130.4	Country Club Road	
Wayne		83.1	133.7	Oberry Road	
Wayne	Brogden	86.7	139.5	US 117 Alt. south – Brogden	
Wayne	Brogden	87.4	140.7	US 13 south – Newton Grove	South end of US 13 overlap
Wayne	Goldsboro	89.5	144.0	NC 581 south (Arlington Bridge Road)	South end of NC 581 overlap
Wayne	Goldsboro	90.3	145.3	US 117 Bus. north (George Street)	
Wayne	Goldsboro	91.8	147.7	NC 581 north to I-795 north / US 70 west – Wilson, Raleigh	North end of NC 581 overlap
Wayne	Goldsboro	92.3	148.5	To NC 581 / Ash Street	
Wayne	Goldsboro	92.9	149.5	US 70 west / US 70 Bus. east (Grantham Street) – Raleigh	West end of US 70 overlap
Wayne	Goldsboro	93.6	150.6	US 13 north / US 70 east – Kinston, Greenville	North end of US 13 and east end of US 70 overlap
Wayne	Goldsboro	94.7	152.4	US 117 Bus. south to NC 111 (William Street)	
Wayne		95.8	154.2	I-42 (Goldsboro Bypass) – Wilson	I-42 Exit 40
Wayne	Fremont	104.2	167.7	NC 222 east (Main Street) – Eureka	East end of NC 222 overlap
Wayne	Fremont	104.3	167.9	NC 222 west (Carolina Street) – Kenly	West end of NC 222 overlap
Wilson	Wilson	114.0	183.5	US 301 to I-587 / I-795 / US 264 – Kenly, Wilson	Northern terminus
1.000 mi = 1.609 km; 1.000 km = 0.621 mi: Concurrency terminus

== Special routes ==
=== Burgaw business loop ===
U.S. Highway 117 Business
- Location: Burgaw, North Carolina
- Length: 2.0 mi (3.2 km)
- Existed: 1960–present
- History: Signed as US 117A from 1953 to 1960

U.S. Highway 117A
- Location: Burgaw, North Carolina
- Length: 2.0 mi (3.2 km)
- Existed: 1953–1960

U.S. Route 117 Business (US 117 Business) is a business route of US 117 which runs through the town of Burgaw. The highway runs for 2.0 miles (3.2 km) from US 117 southeast of downtown to US 117 north of downtown. US 117 Business shares a 0.3 miles (0.48 km) concurrency with NC 53 between Wilmington Street and the Jacksonville Highway. The special route was originally established in 1952 as US 117A when US 117 was rerouted east of downtown Burgaw. In 1960, NCDOT renumbered US 117A in Burgaw and Goldsboro to US 117 Business, establishing the current routing.

US 117 Business begins at an intersection with US 117 in southeastern Burgaw. From its southern terminus, the highway runs northwestward along Walker Street. Between Hayes Street and Satchwell Street, US 117 Business makes a slight curve, giving the highway a northern orientation. Entering into downtown Burgaw from the south, US 117 Business runs along the eastern side of the Pender County Courthouse. US 117 Business meets NC 53 at an intersection with Wilmington Street in downtown. Both highways run in concurrency to the northeast, exiting downtown Burgaw. At Bridgers Street, US 117 Business/NC 53 turns to the east to follow the street. East of Cowan Street, the business route makes a turn to the northeast. NC 53 diverges from US 117 Business at the Jacksonville Highway, marking the end of the concurrency through Burgaw. US 117 Business follows Timberly Lane to the north until reaching its northern terminus at US 117.

Major junctions

The entire route is in Burgaw, Pender County.

mi	km	Destinations	Notes
0.00	0.00	US 117 – Rocky Point, Wilmington	
1.2	1.9	NC 53 west (Wilmington Street) – Atkinson	West end of NC 53 overlap
1.5	2.4	NC 53 east (Jacksonville Highway) – Jacksonville	East end of NC 53 overlap
2.00	3.22	US 117 – Wallace, Goldsboro	
1.000 mi = 1.609 km; 1.000 km = 0.621 mi: Concurrency terminus

=== Calypso Connector ===
U.S. Highway 117 Connector
- Location: Calypso, North Carolina
- Length: 5.2 mi (8.4 km)
- Existed: 2009–present

U.S. Route 117 Connector (US 117 Conn) is a 5.2-mile (8.4 km) spur route of US 117 running from I-40/NC 403 to US 117 in Calypso. Despite being signed as north–south, the highway physically travels in an east–west direction. The highway shares a brief 0.2 miles (0.32 km) concurrency on its southern end with NC 403. East of the intersection, US 117 Connector continues along a four-lane divided highway. It meets NC 50 at an intersection north of Faison. NC 50 is the last intersection along US 117 Connector until it meets US 117 north of Calypso.

The road which eventually became US 117 Connector was built in 1995 as a secondary road running from NC 403 to US 117. US 117 Connector was established on March 9, 2009, running from I-40 to US 117 north of Calypso. The new designation replaced the secondary road and created a concurrency with NC 403 along the southernmost 0.2 miles (0.32 km) of the highway.

Major junctions

County	Location	mi	km	Destinations	Notes
Sampson		0.00	0.00	I-40 / NC 403 south – Clinton, Seven Springs, Raleigh	Southern terminus; Southern end of NC 403 overlap
Sampson		0.2	0.32	NC 403 north – Faison	Northern end of the NC 403 overlap
Duplin		2.1	3.4	NC 50 – Warsaw, Newton Grove	
Duplin	Calypso	5.2	8.4	US 117 – Warsaw, Goldsboro	Northern terminus
1.000 mi = 1.609 km; 1.000 km = 0.621 mi: Concurrency terminus

=== Calypso–Mount Olive business loop ===
U.S. Highway 117 Business
- Location: Calypso–Mount Olive, NC
- Length: 5.94 mi (9.56 km)
- Existed: 1960–1988

U.S. Route 117 Business (US 117 Business) was a 5.94-mile (9.56 km) business route of US 117 through the towns of Calypso and Mount Olive. The business route began at US 117 southwest of the central business area of Calypso. It then ran to the northeast, parallel with the Seaboard Coast Line Railroad to the located to the east. The highway exited Calypso to the northeast and traveled 1.4 miles (2.3 km) through rural Duplin County before crossing into Wayne County. US 117 Business entered the town of Mount Olive from the southwest and continued to run in a northeastern orientation along Breazeale Avenue. It intersected NC 55 in the northernmost town limits of Mount Olive. US 117 Business continued northeast for 0.95 miles (1.53 km) before meeting its northern terminus at US 117.

US 117 was originally routed through the towns of Calypso and Mount Olive. In 1960, US 117 was placed onto a bypass to the west of both towns. The former routing was designated as US 117 Business. The highway lasted from 1960 to 1988 when the US 117 bypass was extended north to Brogden. US 117 Business was decommissioned and US 117 Alternate was signed along the entirety of former US 117 between Calypso and Brogden.

Major junctions (Note: Junctions in 1980 shown.)

County	Location	mi	km	Destinations	Notes
Duplin	Calypso	0.00	0.00	US 117 – Goldsboro, Faison, Wilmington	
Wayne	Mount Olive	4.99	8.03	NC 55 – Kinston, Newton Grove	
Wayne	Mount Olive	5.94	9.56	US 117 – Brogden, Goldsboro	
1.000 mi = 1.609 km; 1.000 km = 0.621 mi

=== Calypso–Brogden alternate route ===
U.S. Highway 117 Alternate
- Location: Calypso–Brogden, NC
- Length: 12.6 mi (20.3 km)
- Existed: 1988–present

U.S. Route 117 Alternate (US 117 Alt) is a 12.6-mile (20.3 km) alternate route of US 117 running through the towns of Calypso, Mount Olive, and Brogden. The highway travels from US 117 in Calypso to US 117 north of Brogden. US 117 Alternate was established on November 28, 1988. US 117 Alternate was a renumbering of US 117 Business through Calypso and Mount Olive, and a partial renumbering of US 117 between Mount Olive and Brogden. The routing of US 117 Alternate consists of the former routing of US 117 prior to the completion of a bypass around Calypso, Mount Olive, and Brogden.

The southern terminus of US 117 Alternate is located at an at-grade intersection with US 117 in Calypso. The highway runs northeast through Calypso along a two-lane highway, paralleling a CSX Transportation railroad to the east. Exiting Calypso to the northeast, the highway runs through a rural area between Calypso and Mount Olive. US 117 Alternate enters Mount Olive from the southwest, initially running through a residential area of the town. At Henderson Street, the highway widens to a five-lane undivided highway, with two lanes in each direction and a turning lane. US 117 Alternate meets NC 55 at an at-grade intersection in northern Mount Olive. North of Mount Olive, US 117 Alternate closely parallels US 117. The highway crosses through the western area of the unincorporated community of Dudley. In the center of the community, US 117 Alternate intersects Oberry Road and Sleepy Creek Road, which provide access to US 117. US 117 Alternate runs through western Brogden and exits the community to the northwest. Shortly before its northern terminus, the highway makes a slight turn to the north. US 117 Alternate reaches its northern terminus at US 117 between Brogden and Mar-Mac.

Major junctions

County	Location	mi	km	Destinations	Notes
Duplin	Calypso	0.00	0.00	US 117 – Goldsboro, Faison, Wilmington	
Wayne	Mount Olive	5.0	8.0	NC 55 – Kinston, Newton Grove	
Wayne	Brogden	12.6	20.3	US 117 to US 13 – Goldsboro, Newton Grove	
1.000 mi = 1.609 km; 1.000 km = 0.621 mi

=== Goldsboro business loop ===
U.S. Highway 117 Business
- Location: Goldsboro, North Carolina
- Length: 4.2 mi (6.8 km)
- Existed: 1960–present
- History: Signed as US 117A from 1951 to 1960

U.S. Highway 117A
- Location: Goldsboro, North Carolina
- Length: 4.2 mi (6.8 km)
- Existed: 1951–1960

U.S. Route 117 Business (US 117 Bus) is a 4.2-mile (6.8 km) business route of US 117 through the city of Goldsboro. The southern terminus of US 117 Business is located at an intersection with US 13/US 117/NC 581 on the south side of Goldsboro. The highway travels north along George Street through a commercial area of southwestern Goldsboro. US 117 Business meets US 70 Business at an intersection with Ash Street. The highway turns onto Ash Street to run concurrently with US 70 Business to the east. In downtown Goldsboro, US 117 Business intersects Center Street at a roundabout. US 117 Business continues east for 0.20 miles (0.32 km) until reaching Williams Street. At the intersection, US 117 Business turns to follow Williams Street to the north, marking the end of the US 70 Business concurrency. The highway meets US 13/US 70/NC 111 at an interchange north of downtown Goldsboro. US 117 Business and NC 111 run concurrently for 0.6 miles (0.97 km) between the freeway and Patetown Road. The highway continues north of Patetown Road for 450 feet (140 m) until reaching its northern terminus at US 117.

The alignment of US 117 Business was once part of the route of US 117 prior to 1951. In 1951, US 117 was shifted onto a newly constructed bypass of Goldsboro, similar to the alignment it follows today. US 117A was established along the former routing through downtown Goldsboro. In 1960, US 117A was renumbered as US 117 Business alongside US 117A in Burgaw. Between 1960 and 1961, the highway shared a concurrency with NC 102 along George Street and Ash Street. NC 102 was decommissioned along much of its route west of Snow Hill, ending the concurrency.

Major junctions

The entire route is in Goldsboro, Wayne County.

mi	km	Destinations	Notes
0.0	0.0	US 13 / US 117 / NC 581 – Mount Olive, Newton Grove	Southern terminus
1.8	2.9	US 70 Bus. west (Ash Street)	West end of US 70 Business overlap
2.2	3.5	US 70 Bus. east (Ash Street)	East end of US 70 Bus. overlap
3.4	5.5	US 13 / US 70 / NC 111 south – Greenville, Kinston, Seven Springs	South end of NC 111 overlap
4.0	6.4	NC 111 north (Patetown Road)	North end of NC 111 overlap
4.2	6.8	US 117 – Pikeville, Wilson	Northern terminus
1.000 mi = 1.609 km; 1.000 km = 0.621 mi: Concurrency terminus

=== Goldsboro–Wilson alternate route ===
U.S. Highway 117 Alternate
- Location: Goldsboro–Wilson, NC
- Length: 23.6 mi (38.0 km)
- Existed: 2006–2009

U.S. Route 117 Alternate (US 117 Alternate) was a 23.6 miles (38.0 km) alternate route of US 117 between Goldsboro and Wilson, North Carolina. The southern terminus of US 117 Alternate was located at an intersection with US 117/US 13/NC 581 on the west side of Goldsboro. US 117 Alternate ran along a freeway to the northeast concurrently with US 13. The highway met US 70/US 70 Business at an interchange with Grantham Street in northwest Goldsboro. From the interchange, US 70 began to follow concurrently with US 13 and US 117 Alternate to the east. US 117 Alternate exited the freeway at an incomplete trumpet interchange marking the end of the US 13/US 70 concurrency. The highway continued northeast until meeting US 117 Business, where it made a slight turn onto Williams Street. US 117 Alternate followed Williams Street to the north, leaving Goldsboro. US 117 Alternate ran through the downtown areas of Pikeville on Goldsboro Street. Continuing north, US 117 Alternate passed through the downtown area of Fremont along Wilson Street. The alternate route ran concurrently with NC 222 between Main Street and Carolina Street in downtown Fremont. North of Fremont, US 117 Alternate passed the town of Black Creek to the west. It intersected US 301 south of Wilson, and turned north to run concurrently with US 301 for 0.4 miles (0.64 km). US 117 Alternate met US 264 at an interchange south of Wilson. At the interchange, US 117 Alternate turned west to follow concurrently with US 264. After 0.6 miles (0.97 km), US 117 Alternate met its northern terminus at an incomplete interchange with US 117/US 264. US 117/US 264 continued to the west toward I-95.

US 117 Alternate was established on September 7, 2006, as a renumbering of mainline US 117 through Goldsboro, Pikeville, and Fremont. At the time, US 117 was placed onto a freeway routing along modern-day I-795. The alternate route continued to exist between 2006 and 2009 while US 117 was routed along the freeway. In April 2009, I-795 was officially designated, and US 117 was removed from its freeway routing between Goldsboro and I-795. US 117 was rerouted to follow its pre-2006 routing, along US 117 Alternate between Goldsboro and US 301. As a result, the entire alternate route was decommissioned on March 9, 2009.

Major junctions (Note: Junctions in 2009 shown.)

County	Location	mi	km	Destinations	Notes
Wayne	Goldsboro	0.00	0.00	US 13 south / US 117 / NC 581 – Mount Olive, Wilson, Newton Grove	Southern terminus; South end of US 13 overlap
Wayne	Goldsboro	1.1	1.8	US 70 west / US 70 Bus. east – Princeton, Raleigh	West end of the US 70 overlap
Wayne	Goldsboro	1.7	2.7	US 13 north / US 70 east – Greenville, Kinston	North end of the US 13 overlap and east end of the US 70 overlap
Wayne	Goldsboro	2.9	4.7	US 117 Bus. south to NC 111	Northern terminus of US 117 Business
Wayne	Fremont	12.4	20.0	NC 222 east (Main Street) – Stantonsburg	East end of the NC 222 overlap
Wayne	Fremont	12.5	20.1	NC 222 west (Carolina Street) – Kenly	West end of the NC 222 overlap
Wilson		22.2	35.7	US 301 south – Smithfield	South end of the US 301 overlap
Wilson	Wilson	22.6	36.4	US 264 / US 301 north – Greenville, Rocky Mount	North end of the US 301 overlap and east end of the US 264 overlap
Wilson	Wilson	23.6	38.0	US 117 north / US 264 west – Raleigh	Northern terminus; West end of the US 264 overlap
1.000 mi = 1.609 km; 1.000 km = 0.621 mi: Concurrency terminus

== See also ==
- Seymour Johnson Air Force Base
- USS North Carolina (BB-55)
