= Mar-Mac, North Carolina =

- Census-designated place
- Location within the state of North Carolina
- Coordinates: 35°20′04″N 78°03′16″W
- Country: United States
- State: North Carolina
- County: Wayne

Area
  - Total: 4.58 sq mi (11.85 km^{2})
  - Land: 4.55 sq mi (11.78 km^{2})
  - Water: 0.027 sq mi (0.07 km^{2})
- Elevation: 115 ft (35 m)

Population (2020)
  - Total: 3,184
  - Density: 699.9/sq mi (270.24/km^{2})
- Time zone: UTC-5 (Eastern (EST))
  - Summer (DST): UTC-4 (EDT)
- FIPS code: 37-41540
- GNIS feature ID: 2403255

Mar-Mac is a census-designated place (CDP) in Wayne County, North Carolina, United States. As of the 2020 census, Mar-Mac had a population of 3,184. It is included in the Goldsboro, North Carolina Metropolitan Statistical Area.

== Geography ==
According to the United States Census Bureau, the CDP has a total area of 4.4 square miles (11 km^{2}), of which, 4.4 square miles (11 km^{2}) of it is land and 0.04 square miles (0.10 km^{2}) of it (0.68%) is water.

== Demographics ==
Historical population
Census	Pop.	Note	%±
2020	3,184		—
U.S. Decennial Census

=== 2020 census ===
As of the 2020 census, Mar-Mac had a population of 3,184. The median age was 38.7 years. 23.2% of residents were under the age of 18 and 18.6% of residents were 65 years of age or older. For every 100 females there were 94.1 males, and for every 100 females age 18 and over there were 91.2 males age 18 and over.

78.1% of residents lived in urban areas, while 21.9% lived in rural areas.

There were 1,305 households in Mar-Mac, of which 29.6% had children under the age of 18 living in them. Of all households, 39.4% were married-couple households, 19.8% were households with a male householder and no spouse or partner present, and 32.0% were households with a female householder and no spouse or partner present. About 29.5% of all households were made up of individuals and 11.5% had someone living alone who was 65 years of age or older.

There were 1,506 housing units, of which 13.3% were vacant. The homeowner vacancy rate was 0.9% and the rental vacancy rate was 3.7%.

Racial composition as of the 2020 census
Race	Number	Percent
White	1,601	50.3%
Black or African American	901	28.3%
American Indian and Alaska Native	23	0.7%
Asian	35	1.1%
Native Hawaiian and Other Pacific Islander	6	0.2%
Some other race	364	11.4%
Two or more races	254	8.0%
Hispanic or Latino (of any race)	525	16.5%

=== 2000 census ===
As of the 2000 census, there were 3,004 people, 1,232 households, and 868 families residing in the CDP. The population density was 685.7 inhabitants per square mile (264.8/km^{2}). There were 1,485 housing units at an average density of 338.9 per square mile (130.9/km^{2}). The racial makeup of the CDP was 75.00% White, 19.54% African American, 0.53% Native American, 1.50% Asian, 2.10% from other races, and 1.33% from two or more races. Hispanic or Latino of any race were 3.16% of the population.

There were 1,232 households, out of which 30.3% had children under the age of 18 living with them, 54.1% were married couples living together, 13.4% had a female householder with no husband present, and 29.5% were non-families. 24.0% of all households were made up of individuals, and 8.2% had someone living alone who was 65 years of age or older. The average household size was 2.43 and the average family size was 2.88.

In the CDP, the population was spread out, with 22.5% under the age of 18, 9.5% from 18 to 24, 28.9% from 25 to 44, 26.8% from 45 to 64, and 12.4% who were 65 years of age or older. The median age was 38 years. For every 100 females, there were 97.0 males. For every 100 females age 18 and over, there were 93.1 males.

The median income for a household in the CDP was $40,145, and the median income for a family was $43,235. Males had a median income of $30,279 versus $21,715 for females. The per capita income for the CDP was $18,794. About 5.3% of families and 7.2% of the population were below the poverty line, including 13.9% of those under age 18 and none of those age 65 or over.

== Education ==
Education in Mar-Mac is administered by the Wayne County Public School system with children attending schools in nearby townships. Higher education is offered through Wayne Community College in Goldsboro and Mount Olive College in Mount Olive.

== Transportation ==
=== Passenger ===
- Air: Mar-Mac is served through nearby Kinston Regional Jetport (IATA: ISO, ICAO: KISO), although it no longer has scheduled commercial service. Raleigh-Durham International Airport is the closest major airport with service to more than 45 domestic and international destinations. Goldsboro-Wayne Municipal Airport is an airport located nearby, but is only used for general aviation.
- Interstate Highway: I-795 is the closest Interstate to Mar-Mac, which is located 5 miles north in Goldsboro.
- Mar-Mac is not served directly by passenger trains. The closest Amtrak station is located in Selma.
- Bus: The area is served by Greyhound with a location in nearby Goldsboro.

=== Roads ===
- The main highways in Mar-Mac are US 117 and US 13.
