= Brogden, North Carolina =

- CDP
- Location within the state of North Carolina
- Coordinates: 35°17′46″N 78°01′30″W
- Country: United States
- State: North Carolina
- County: Wayne

Area
  - Total: 2.25 sq mi (5.84 km^{2})
  - Land: 2.22 sq mi (5.74 km^{2})
  - Water: 0.039 sq mi (0.10 km^{2})
- Elevation: 151 ft (46 m)

Population (2020)
  - Total: 2,510
  - Density: 1,132.7/sq mi (437.34/km^{2})
- Time zone: UTC-5 (Eastern (EST))
  - Summer (DST): UTC-4 (EDT)
- ZIP code: 28333
- Area codes: 919 and 984
- FIPS code: 37-08110
- GNIS feature ID: 2402718

Brogden is a census-designated place (CDP) in Wayne County, North Carolina, United States. The population was 2,510 in 2020. It is included in the Goldsboro, North Carolina Metropolitan Statistical Area.

== History ==
The community takes its name from the Brogden family, Quakers of English descent who settled in the area during the colonial period.

== Geography ==
According to the United States Census Bureau, the CDP has a total area of 2.2 square miles (5.7 km^{2}), of which, 2.2 square miles (5.7 km^{2}) of it is land and 0.04 square miles (0.10 km^{2}) of it (1.82%) is water.

Brogden's elevations are on average 175 feet above sea level. The area is underlain by unconsolidated beds of sand, clay and gravel. Most of these beds were deposited in seawater as the sea advanced and retreated during the geologic development of the Atlantic Coastal Plain. To a much lesser extent, streams deposited layers of sediment which mixed with that deposited on the sea floor.

The climate in Brogden is characterized by warm summers and moderate winters. The average temperature is about 62 degrees. Annual precipitation is about 50 inches of rainfall per year, with the major portion occurring in the late spring and summer.

Brogden also is the name of a farming community in neighboring Johnston County where Hollywood actress Ava Gardner lived as a child.

== Demographics ==
Historical population
| Census | Pop. | Note | %± |
|---|---|---|---|
| 2000 | 2,907 | | — |
| 2010 | 2,633 | | −9.4% |
| 2020 | 2,510 | | −4.7% |
U.S. Decennial Census; 2010 2020

=== Racial and ethnic composition ===
Brogden CDP, North Carolina – Racial and ethnic composition Note: the US Census treats Hispanic/Latino as an ethnic category. This table excludes Latinos from the racial categories and assigns them to a separate category. Hispanics/Latinos may be of any race.
| Race / Ethnicity (NH = Non-Hispanic) | Pop 2000 | Pop 2010 | Pop 2020 | % 2000 | % 2010 | % 2020 |
|---|---|---|---|---|---|---|
| White alone (NH) | 1,011 | 793 | 607 | 34.78% | 30.12% | 24.18% |
| Black or African American alone (NH) | 1,644 | 1,411 | 1,121 | 56.55% | 53.59% | 44.66% |
| Native American or Alaska Native alone (NH) | 15 | 8 | 4 | 0.52% | 0.30% | 0.16% |
| Asian alone (NH) | 10 | 18 | 9 | 0.34% | 0.68% | 0.36% |
| Native Hawaiian or Pacific Islander alone (NH) | 0 | 1 | 0 | 0.00% | 0.04% | 0.00% |
| Other race alone (NH) | 0 | 8 | 10 | 0.00% | 0.30% | 0.40% |
| Mixed race or Multiracial (NH) | 33 | 30 | 86 | 1.14% | 1.14% | 3.43% |
| Hispanic or Latino (any race) | 194 | 364 | 673 | 6.67% | 13.82% | 26.81% |
| Total | 2,907 | 2,633 | 2,510 | 100.00% | 100.00% | 100.00% |

=== 2020 census ===
As of the 2020 census, Brogden had a population of 2,510. The median age was 38.8 years. 24.8% of residents were under the age of 18 and 19.7% of residents were 65 years of age or older. For every 100 females there were 92.5 males, and for every 100 females age 18 and over there were 88.9 males age 18 and over.

99.8% of residents lived in urban areas, while 0.2% lived in rural areas.

There were 966 households in Brogden, of which 30.2% had children under the age of 18 living in them. Of all households, 38.4% were married-couple households, 18.7% were households with a male householder and no spouse or partner present, and 35.4% were households with a female householder and no spouse or partner present. About 27.0% of all households were made up of individuals and 13.4% had someone living alone who was 65 years of age or older.

There were 1,084 housing units, of which 10.9% were vacant. The homeowner vacancy rate was 0.7% and the rental vacancy rate was 3.4%.

=== 2000 census ===
As of the census of 2000, there were 2,907 people, 1,030 households, and 784 families residing in the CDP. The population density was 1,346.1 inhabitants per square mile (519.7/km^{2}). There were 1,157 housing units at an average density of 535.8 per square mile (206.9/km^{2}). The racial makeup of the CDP was 36.29% White, 56.90% African American, 0.52% Native American, 0.34% Asian, 4.27% from other races, and 1.69% from two or more races. Hispanic or Latino of any race were 6.67% of the population.

There were 1,030 households, out of which 35.9% had children under the age of 18 living with them, 49.6% were married couples living together, 21.8% had a female householder with no husband present, and 23.8% were non-families. 18.0% of all households were made up of individuals, and 5.0% had someone living alone who was 65 years of age or older. The average household size was 2.82 and the average family size was 3.17.

In the CDP, the population was spread out, with 28.1% under the age of 18, 9.7% from 18 to 24, 28.8% from 25 to 44, 25.2% from 45 to 64, and 8.2% who were 65 years of age or older. The median age was 35 years. For every 100 females, there were 93.9 males. For every 100 females age 18 and over, there were 88.5 males.

The median income for a household in the CDP was $32,875, and the median income for a family was $35,804. Males had a median income of $25,545 versus $19,828 for females. The per capita income for the CDP was $15,293. About 13.6% of families and 15.1% of the population were below the poverty line, including 23.5% of those under age 18 and 29.4% of those age 65 or over.

== Education ==
Education in Brogden is administered by the Wayne County Public School system with children attending schools in nearby townships. Higher education is offered through Wayne Community College in Goldsboro and Mount Olive College in Mount Olive.

== Transportation ==
=== Passenger ===
- Air: Brogden is served through nearby Kinston Regional Jetport (IATA: ISO, ICAO: KISO) with service to Orlando, Florida. Raleigh-Durham International Airport is the closest major airport with service to more than 45 domestic and international destinations. Goldsboro-Wayne Municipal Airport is an airport located nearby, but is only used for general aviation.
- Interstate Highway: I-795 is the closest Interstate to Brogden, which is located 7 miles north in Goldsboro.
- Brogden is not served directly by passenger trains. The closest Amtrak station is located in Selma.
- Bus: The area is served by Greyhound with a location in nearby Goldsboro.

=== Roads ===
- The main highway in Brogden is US 117.
