= North Carolina Highway 403 =

State highway in North Carolina, US

North Carolina Highway 403
- NC 403 highlighted in red

Route information
- Maintained by NCDOT
- Length: 25.7 mi (41.4 km)
- Existed: 1933–present

Major junctions
- South end: US 701 Bus. in Clinton
- I-40 / US 117 Conn. near Faison; US 117 / NC 50 in Faison
- North end: NC 55 in Williams

Location
- Country: United States
- State: North Carolina
- Counties: Sampson, Duplin, Wayne

Highway system
- North Carolina Highway System; Interstate; US; State; Scenic
← US 401	→ NC 410

North Carolina Highway 403 (NC 403) is a primary state highway located in U.S. State of North Carolina. The highway travels through Sampson, Duplin, and Wayne Counties between its southern terminus at U.S. Route 701 Business (US 701 Business) in Clinton and NC 55 in Williams. Between its termini, NC 403 connects to Interstate 40 (I-40) and Faison. The highway is primarily rural and predominantly travels through rural forests and farmlands. While signed in a north–south direction, NC 403 physically travels in a northeast–southwest direction along the duration of its route.

Prior to the establishment of NC 403, multiple secondary roads linked Clinton and Faison. NC 403 was established in 1933, running along secondary roads from US 701/NC 23 north of Clinton to US 117/NC 40 in Faison. By 1935, the southern terminus was shifted to NC 24 at Warsaw Road in Clinton. NC 403 was extended northeast from Faison to NC 55 in Williams in 1957. The southern terminus of NC 403 was once again moved from Warsaw Road to US 701 (modern-day US 701 Business) in 1966. In 2009, US 117 Connector was routed from I-40 to US 117, creating a 0.2-mile (0.32 km) concurrency near the I-40 interchange.

== Route description ==
NC 403 is a predominantly two-lane rural highway that traverses 25.7 miles (41.4 km) from Clinton to Williams. The southern terminus of NC 403 is located at an at-grade intersection with US 701 Business (Northeast Boulevard) northeast of downtown Clinton. From the intersection, NC 403 runs northeastward along the two-lane Faison Highway, exiting Clinton to the northeast. Outside of Clinton, the majority of the surrounding area is farmland and forested areas. However, some residential neighborhoods are located adjacent to NC 403 on the outskirts of the city. The highway crosses Beaverdam Swamp and makes a gradual turn northward. Beyond the initial curve, the highway makes several minor turns to return to a northeastern orientation. NC 403 intersects Keener Road which runs westward to the census-designated place of Keener. The highway crosses several other river branches of the Cape Fear River as it approaches I-40. As NC 403 approaches I-40, it widens to a four-lane divided highway. NC 403 meets I-40 at a diamond interchange (I-40 exit 355) southwest of Faison. US 117 Connector begins at the interchange, marking the beginning of the NC 403/US 117 Connector concurrency. NC 403 continues northeast for 0.2 miles (0.32 km) until reaching an at-grade intersection northeast of I-40. At the intersection, NC 403 turns southeastward toward Faison while US 117 Connector continues northeast toward Calypso.

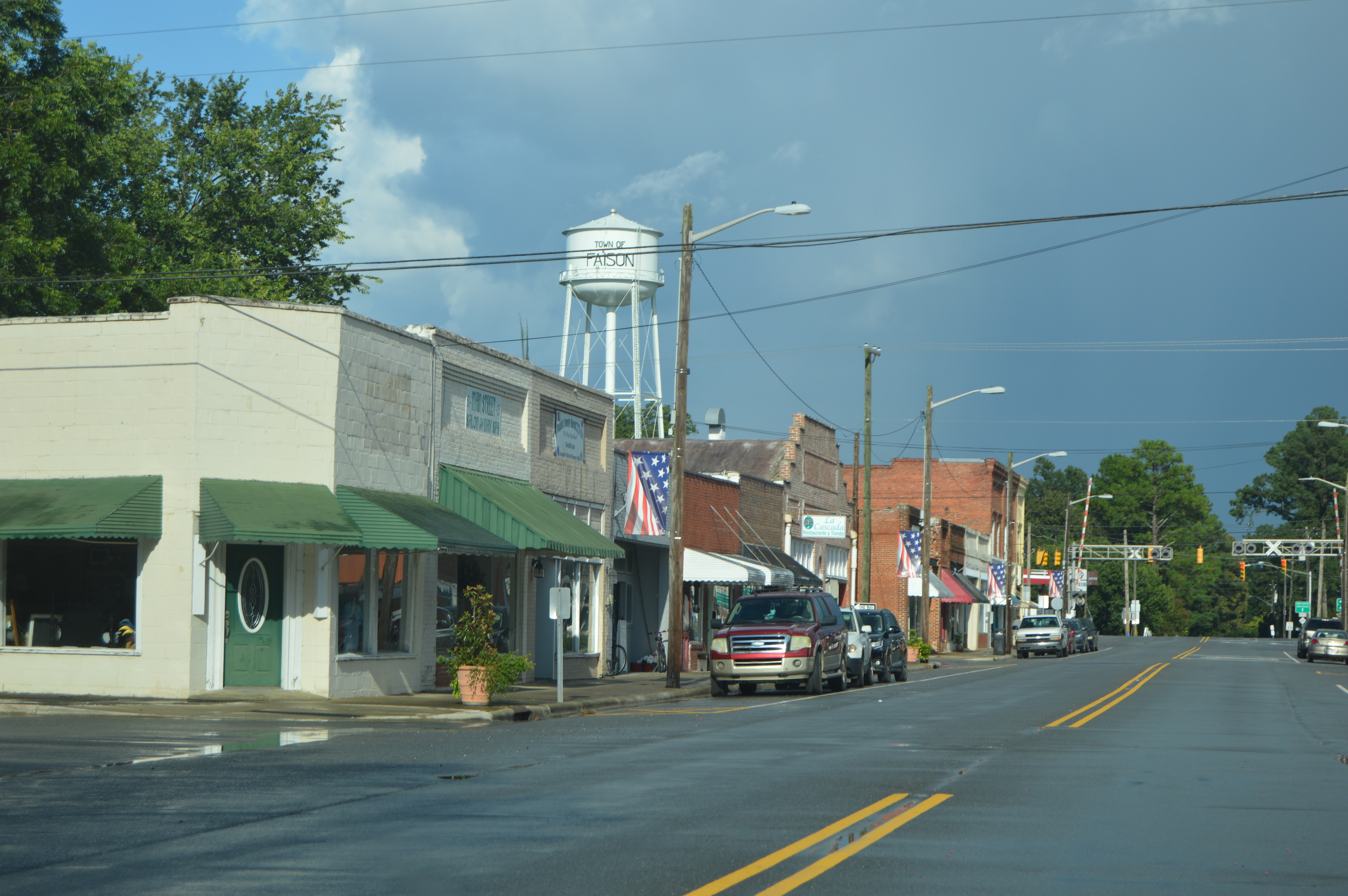
NC 403 and NC 50 travel concurrently through the Faison Historic District in Faison.

NC 403 travels 0.7 miles (1.1 km) before crossing into Duplin County. Approaching Faison, NC 403 makes a reverse curve before intersecting NC 50 west of the town. At the intersection, NC 50 turns to run concurrently with NC 403 to the east. Entering Faison from the west, NC 403 and NC 50 travel along Main Street to pass through the downtown area of Faison. Immediately east of the central business area, the highway crosses a CSX Transportation owned railroad line at an at-grade crossing and meets US 117/NC 50 at an intersection. The NC 403/NC 50 concurrency ends at the intersection as NC 50 turns south to follow US 117 toward Warsaw. NC 403 exits Faison to the east and the surrounding area becomes predominately farmland. The highway makes a turn to the northeast and intersects several secondary roads that run northwest to Calypso. NC 403 makes a turn to the southeast before intersecting Beautancus Road which runs north to Mount Olive. At the intersection, the highway turns back to the northeast, an orientation it largely remains for the duration of its route. NC 403 passes through a community southeast of Mount Olive, with several businesses and residential buildings located adjacent to the highway. From the community, NC 403 continues northeastward for 2.1 miles (3.4 km) and crosses the Northeast Cape Fear River and enters Wayne County. It continues 0.7 miles (1.1 km) to its northern terminus at NC 55 in the unincorporated community of Williams.

The North Carolina Department of Transportation (NCDOT) measures average daily traffic volumes along many of the roadways it maintains. In 2016, average daily traffic volumes along NC 403 varied from 1,200 vehicles per day at the Northeast Cape Fear River to 12,000 vehicles per day along the section to roadway concurrent with US 117 Connector east of I-40. NC 403 is part of the National Highway System for 0.2 miles (0.32 km), entirely concurrent with US 117 Connector near Faison. Additionally, NC 403 connects with the National Highway system at I-40.

== History ==
In 1930, several graded secondary roads linked Clinton and Faison along the future routing of NC 403. NC 403 first appeared on North Carolina state highway maps in 1933. The highway began at US 701/NC 23 two miles (three point two kilometres) north of Clinton and ran northeast to US 117/NC 40 in Faison. From its establishment NC 403 was classified as a gravel or topsoil road. By 1935, the southern terminus of NC 403 was adjusted to the south ending at NC 24 (modern-day Warsaw Road) in Clinton. The highway was paved by 1940. In 1957, the northern terminus of NC 403 was extended northeast from US 117 in Faison to NC 55 in Williams. The majority of the new NC 403 routing was along pre-existing secondary roads between Faison and Williams. However, a new highway was created between modern-day Bill Clifton Road and Friendship Church Road, east of Faison. In 1966, NC 403 was shortened by 0.4 miles (0.64 km) on its southern end. The southern terminus was moved from Warsaw Road to US 701 (modern-day US 701 Business), removing NC 403 from College Street. The routing of NC 403 near I-40 was adjusted upon the construction of a secondary road (Sampson County SR 1723) running from NC 403 to US 117. Completed by 1995, a curve along NC 403 east of I-40 was eliminated in favor of the modern-day intersection. In 2009, US 117 Connector was established from I-40 to US 117 near Calypso. The new connector route replaced Sampson County SR 1723 and was routed to overlap NC 403 for 0.2 miles (0.32 km) northeast of I-40.

== Major intersections ==
County	Location	mi	km	Destinations	Notes
Sampson	Clinton	0.0	0.0	US 701 Bus. – Newton Grove, Elizabethtown	Southern terminus
Sampson		11.2	18.0	I-40 / US 117 Conn. – Wilmington, Newton Grove	South end of US 117 Conn. overlap; exit 355 (I-40); diamond interchange
Sampson		11.5	18.5	US 117 Conn. north – Mount Olive, Goldsboro	North end of US 117 Conn. overlap
Duplin	Faison	13.6	21.9	NC 50 north – Newton Grove	North end of NC 50 overlap
Duplin	Faison	14.3	23.0	US 117 / NC 50 south – Goldsboro, Wilmington	South end of NC 50 overlap
Wayne	Williams	25.7	41.4	NC 55 – Kinston, Mount Olive	Northern terminus
1.000 mi = 1.609 km; 1.000 km = 0.621 mi: Concurrency terminus
