= GWW =

GWW may refer to:

- Great White Wonder, a Bob Dylan bootleg album
- Kwini language
- RAF Gatow, a former airfield in Berlin
- W. W. Grainger, an American industrial supply company
- Wayne Executive Jetport, in North Carolina, United States
