= Teachey, North Carolina =

- Town
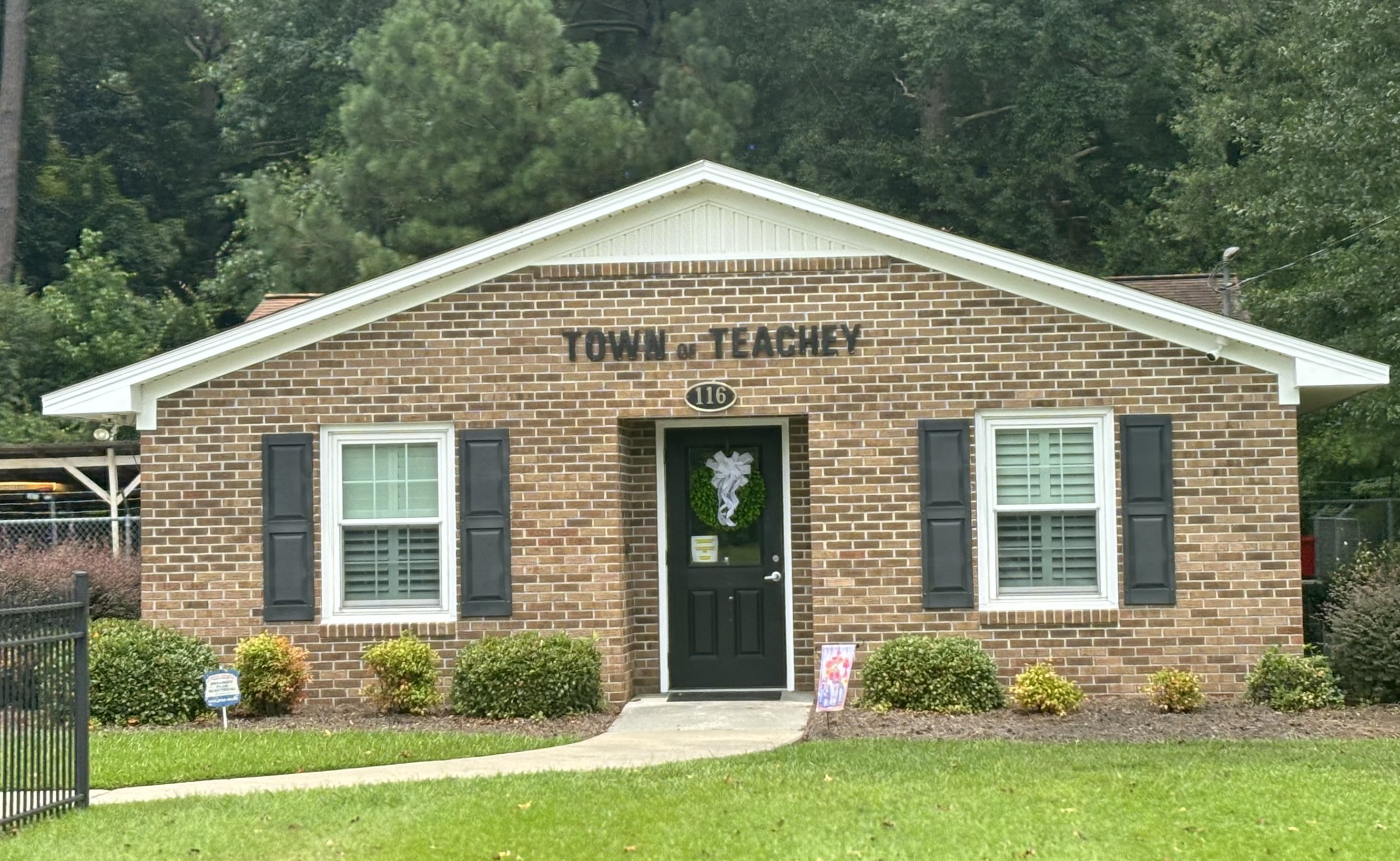
- Teachy Town Hall

- Location within the state of North Carolina
- Coordinates: 34°46′15″N 78°00′22″W
- Country: United States
- State: North Carolina
- County: Duplin

Government
  - Mayor: Robert "Bobby" Jones

Area
  - Total: 1.05 sq mi (2.73 km^{2})
  - Land: 1.05 sq mi (2.73 km^{2})
  - Water: 0 sq mi (0.00 km^{2})
- Elevation: 69 ft (21 m)

Population (2020)
  - Total: 448
  - Density: 425.1/sq mi (164.12/km^{2})
- Time zone: UTC-5 (Eastern (EST))
  - Summer (DST): UTC-4 (EDT)
- ZIP code: 28464
- Area codes: 910, 472
- FIPS code: 37-67000
- GNIS feature ID: 2406724
- Website: https://teacheytown.municipalimpact.com/

Teachey is a town in Duplin County, North Carolina, United States. At the 2020 census, the population was 448.

== Geography ==
Teachey is located in southwestern Duplin County. U.S. Route 117 passes through the center of town, leading south 2.5 miles (4.0 km) to the center of Wallace and north 4 miles (6 km) to Rose Hill. Interstate 40 passes east of town, with access from Exit 384.

According to the United States Census Bureau, Teachey has a total area of 0.93 square miles (2.4 km^{2}), all land.

== Demographics ==
Historical population
Census	Pop.	Note	%±
1880	56		—
1890	52		−7.1%
1910	154		—
1920	164		6.5%
1930	140		−14.6%
1940	228		62.9%
1950	226		−0.9%
1960	187		−17.3%
1970	219		17.1%
1980	373		70.3%
1990	244		−34.6%
2000	245		0.4%
2010	376		53.5%
2020	448		19.1%
U.S. Decennial Census

As of the census of 2000, 245 people, 92 households, and 66 families were residing in the town. The population density was 299.1 inhabitants per square mile (115.5/km^{2}). The 97 housing units averaged 118.4 per square mile (45.7/km^{2}). The racial makeup of the town was 41.63% White, 50.61% African American, 0.82% Asian, 5.71% from other races, and 1.22% from two or more races. Hispanics or Latinos of any race were 6.94% of the population.

Of the 92 households, 30.4% had children under the age of 18 living with them, 54.3% were married couples living together, 13.0% had a female householder with no husband present, and 27.2% were not families. About 26.1% of all households were made up of individuals, and 16.3% had someone living alone who was 65 years of age or older. The average household size was 2.66, and the average family size was 3.16.

In the town, the age distribution was 22.0% under 18, 11.4% from 18 to 24, 26.5% from 25 to 44, 22.4% from 45 to 64, and 17.6% who were 65 or older. The median age was 40 years. For every 100 females, there were 82.8 males. For every 100 females age 18 and over, there were 81.9 males.

The median income for a household in the town was $40,833, and for a family was $51,591. Males had a median income of $38,750 versus $19,028 for females. The per capita income for the town was $19,725. About 4.0% of families and 5.6% of the population were below the poverty line, including none of those under the age of 18 and 8.7% of those 65 or over.
