= Pikeville, North Carolina =

- Town
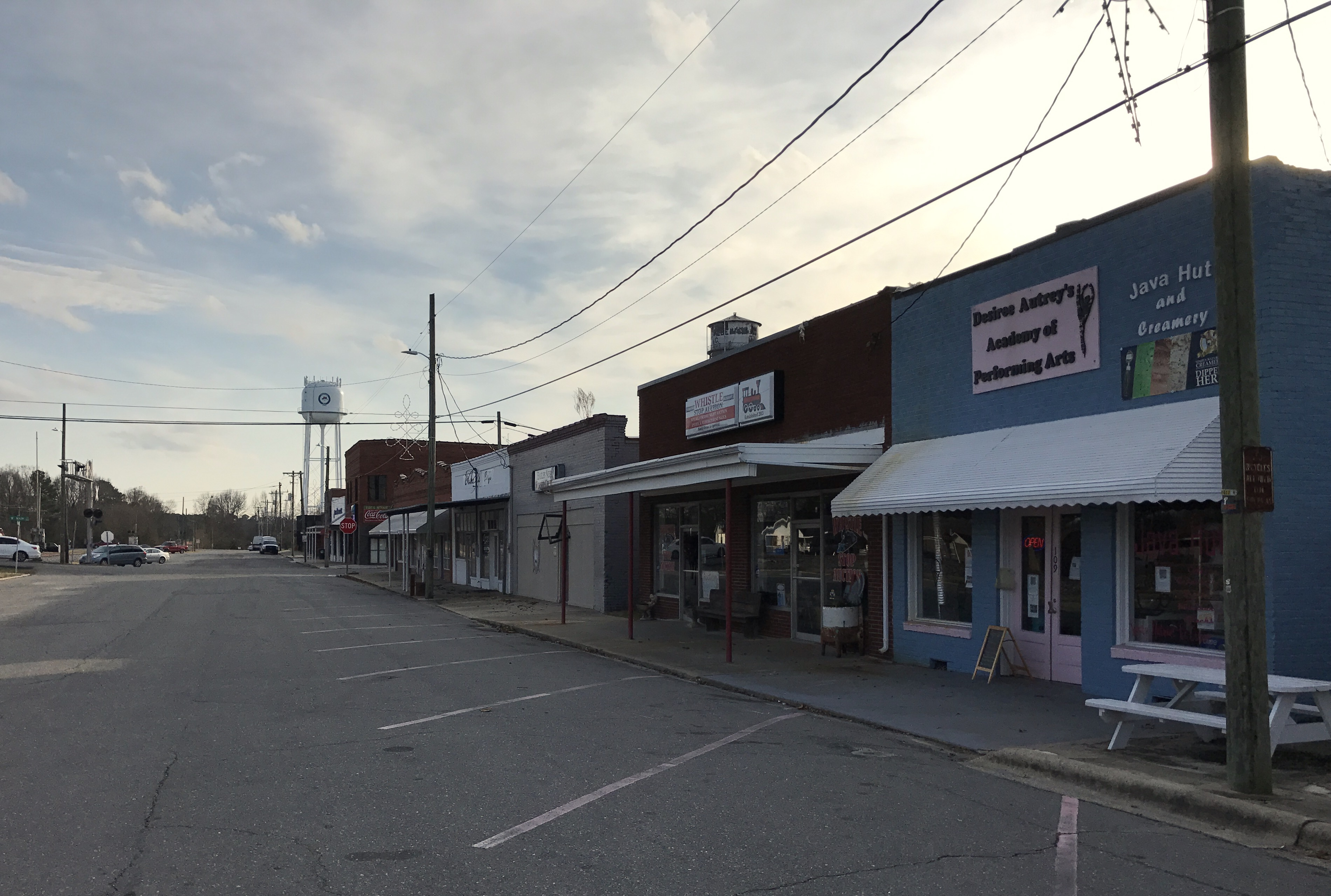
- Nickname: "The Gem of Wayne County"
- Location within the state of North Carolina
- Coordinates: 35°29′56″N 77°59′10″W
- Country: United States
- State: North Carolina
- County: Wayne

Area
  - Total: 0.76 sq mi (1.96 km^{2})
  - Land: 0.76 sq mi (1.96 km^{2})
  - Water: 0 sq mi (0.00 km^{2})
- Elevation: 138 ft (42 m)

Population (2020)
  - Total: 712
  - Density: 942.9/sq mi (364.04/km^{2})
- Time zone: UTC-5 (Eastern (EST))
  - Summer (DST): UTC-4 (EDT)
- ZIP code: 27863
- Area code: 919
- FIPS code: 37-51780
- GNIS feature ID: 2407110
- Website: Pikeville, NC website

Pikeville is a town in Wayne County, North Carolina, United States. As of the 2020 census, Pikeville had a population of 712. It is included in the Goldsboro, North Carolina Metropolitan Statistical Area. It is notable for being the home of Collier Motors, an automobile sales and service business established in 1955 that has remained an American Motors (AMC) dealership.

== Geography ==
According to the United States Census Bureau, the town has a total area of 0.5 square miles (1.3 km^{2}), all of it land.

== History ==
=== Early history ===
Torhunta was a large Native American farming community in present-day northern. The Native Americans left North Carolina and returned to their home in New York where they became members of the Iroquois Nation. After the Native Americans left the area, there was an influx of settlers who came into the rich Neuse River lands and began to clear plantations. Many of these settlers were of the Religious Society of Friends, also known as Quakers.

Samuel Pike moved to the area and settled on the south side of Nahunta Swamp which had been granted by King George II of Great Britain in 1763. This grant of land included between 2,500 and 3,000 acres (12 km^{2}). In 1785, Pike deeded most of this land to his only son Nathan. It was this Nathan Pike for whom the township, the Post Office, and later the town was named.

Nathan Pike owned and operated a large tavern, shop, trading post and hotel. It was then known as Pike’s Junction. In 1856, the first post office opened. During the period of 1793 to 1835 Pike sold around 2,000 acres (8.1 km^{2}) of his land to other families who came here to settle.

=== Civil War ===
During General Sherman’s Carolinas campaign in 1865, Pikeville suffered the same fate of many southern towns. Union soldiers destroyed the hotel and tavern Nathan Pike had built, and many buildings and homes were damaged or destroyed. Some of General Sherman’s forces camped in areas east of Pikeville during this time.

=== Turn of the century ===
The first school in the area was located at a crossroads named Mount Carmel in 1865. In 1908, the Pikeville grade school was made Pikeville High School. It was composed of the schools of Mount Carmel, Sherrad’s Cross Roads, Pleasant Grove, Oak Dale, Possum Trot, Taylor’s Oak Grove, Smith’s Patetown as well as Pikeville grade School. In 1960, Charles B. Aycock High School was opened in Pikeville in honor of the state governor who was an advocate for quality education.

== Demographics ==
Historical population
Census	Pop.	Note	%±
1880	122		—
1900	168		—
1910	210		25.0%
1920	333		58.6%
1930	449		34.8%
1940	425		−5.3%
1950	464		9.2%
1960	525		13.1%
1970	580		10.5%
1980	662		14.1%
1990	598		−9.7%
2000	719		20.2%
2010	678		−5.7%
2020	712		5.0%
U.S. Decennial Census

As of the census of 2000, there were 719 people, 306 households, and 197 families residing in the town. The population density was 1,355.7 inhabitants per square mile (523.4/km^{2}). There were 334 housing units at an average density of 629.7 per square mile (243.1/km^{2}). The racial makeup of the town was 96.52% White, 1.11% African American, 0.42% Native American, 0.83% Asian, 0.42% from other races, and 0.70% from two or more races. Hispanic or Latino of any race were 1.95% of the population.

There were 306 households, out of which 30.7% had children under the age of 18 living with them, 52.6% were married couples living together, 8.8% had a female householder with no husband present, and 35.6% were non-families. 32.4% of all households were made up of individuals, and 18.0% had someone living alone who was 65 years of age or older. The average household size was 2.35 and the average family size was 2.98.

In the town, the population was spread out, with 25.0% under the age of 18, 7.4% from 18 to 24, 28.8% from 25 to 44, 20.9% from 45 to 64, and 17.9% who were 65 years of age or older. The median age was 39 years. For every 100 females, there were 87.2 males. For every 100 females age 18 and over, there were 84.6 males.

The median income for a household in the town was $37,500, and the median income for a family was $53,750. Males had a median income of $30,469 versus $23,750 for females. The per capita income for the town was $18,526. Below the poverty line were 8.2% of people, 6.4% of families, 8.5% of those under 18 and 12.1% of those over 64.

== Education ==
Education in Pikeville is administered by the Wayne County Public Schools system. Schools located in the town include Northeast Elementary School, Northwest Elementary School and Charles B. Aycock High School. Higher education is offered through Wayne Community College in Goldsboro.

== Transportation ==
=== Passenger ===
- Air: Raleigh-Durham International Airport is the closest major airport with service to more than 45 domestic and international destinations. Wayne Executive Jetport is an airport located nearby, but is only used for general aviation.
- Pikeville is not served directly by passenger trains. The closest Amtrak station is located in Wilson.
- Bus: The area is served by Greyhound with a location in nearby Goldsboro.

=== Roads ===
- The main highways in Pikeville are Interstate 795 and US 117.
- Interstate Highway: Interstate 795 runs just west of Pikeville and I-95 is located 15 miles (24 km) west in Kenly.
