= Thirteen Oaks =

Historic farm in North Carolina, United States

- U.S. National Register of Historic Places
- U.S. Historic district
- Location within North Carolina Location within the United States
- Location: Jct. of US 13 and SR 1647, near Newton Grove, North Carolina
- Coordinates: 35°13′07″N 78°23′50″W
- Area: 138 acres (56 ha)
- Built: 1902
- Built by: Ivey, Julius
- Architectural style: Folk Victorian
- MPS: Sampson County MRA
- NRHP reference No.: 90000879
- Added to NRHP: June 7, 1990

Thirteen Oaks, also known as the Lovett Warren Farm, is a historic home and farm complex and national historic district located near Newton Grove, Sampson County, North Carolina. The house was built in 1902, and is a two-story, three bay by two bay, heavy timber frame I-house dwelling. The front facade features a full-width hip roofed porch with Folk Victorian decorative elements. Also on the property are the contributing corn crib, barn, and the family cemetery.

It was added to the National Register of Historic Places in 1990.
