= Isaac Williams House =

Historic house in North Carolina, United States

- U.S. National Register of Historic Places
- Location within North Carolina Location within the United States
- Location: NC 55; also NC 55 at its junction with NC 50, near Newton Grove, North Carolina
- Coordinates: 35°14′52″N 78°22′55″W
- Area: 40.4 acres (16.3 ha)
- Built: c. 1867
- Architect: Larry Massengill
- Architectural style: Greek Revival
- NRHP reference No.: 84002523, 89000467 (Boundary Increase)
- Added to NRHP: March 1, 1984, June 12, 1989 (Boundary Increase)

Isaac Williams House is a historic home located near Newton Grove, Sampson County, North Carolina. The farmhouse was built about 1867, and is a one-story, double-pile, five bay-by-four bay, transitional "Triple-A" frame dwelling, with Greek Revival style design elements. It has a prominent front cross-gable roof and hip roofed, three bay, front porch. A 1 1/2-story rear ell was added about 1980. Also on the property are the contributing servants quarters (c. 1867), family cemetery, and surrounding fields and woodlands.

It was added to the National Register of Historic Places in 1984, with a boundary increase in 1989.
