= Bowdens, North Carolina =

- Census-designated place
- Location within North Carolina Location within the United States
- Coordinates: 35°3′25″N 78°6′52″W
- Country: United States
- State: North Carolina
- County: Duplin

Area
  - Total: 1.41 sq mi (3.64 km^{2})
  - Land: 1.36 sq mi (3.52 km^{2})
  - Water: 0.046 sq mi (0.12 km^{2})
- Elevation: 161 ft (49 m)

Population (2020)
  - Total: 196
  - Density: 144.1/sq mi (55.63/km^{2})
- Time zone: UTC-5 (Eastern (EST))
  - Summer (DST): UTC-4 (EDT)
- ZIP Code: 28398
- Area codes: 910, 472
- FIPS code: 37-07340
- GNIS feature ID: 2812792

Bowdens is an unincorporated community and census-designated place (CDP) in Duplin County, North Carolina, United States. It was first listed as a CDP in the 2020 census, with a population of 196.

The community is in northwestern Duplin County, along U.S. Route 117. It is 4 miles (6 km) north of Warsaw and the same distance south of Faison.

== Demographics ==
Historical population
Census	Pop.	Note	%±
2020	196		—
U.S. Decennial Census; 2020

=== 2020 census ===
Bowdens CDP, North Carolina – Racial and ethnic composition Note: the US Census treats Hispanic/Latino as an ethnic category. This table excludes Latinos from the racial categories and assigns them to a separate category. Hispanics/Latinos may be of any race.
Race / Ethnicity (NH = Non-Hispanic)	Pop 2020	% 2020
White alone (NH)	38	19.39%
Black or African American alone (NH)	118	60.20%
Native American or Alaska Native alone (NH)	1	0.51%
Asian alone (NH)	0	0.00%
Pacific Islander alone (NH)	0	0.00%
Some Other Race alone (NH)	0	0.00%
Mixed Race or Multi-Racial (NH)	1	0.51%
Hispanic or Latino (any race)	38	19.39%
Total	196	100.00%
