= Greenevers, North Carolina =

- Town
- Location within the state of North Carolina
- Coordinates: 34°49′38″N 77°55′30″W
- Country: United States
- State: North Carolina
- County: Duplin

Area
  - Total: 1.59 sq mi (4.11 km^{2})
  - Land: 1.59 sq mi (4.11 km^{2})
  - Water: 0 sq mi (0.00 km^{2})
- Elevation: 59 ft (18 m)

Population (2020)
  - Total: 567
  - Density: 357/sq mi (137.9/km^{2})
- Time zone: UTC-5 (Eastern (EST))
  - Summer (DST): UTC-4 (EDT)
- ZIP code: 28458
- Area codes: 910, 472
- FIPS code: 37-27780
- GNIS feature ID: 2406612
- Website: https://townofgreenevers.com/

Greenevers is a town in Duplin County, North Carolina, United States. As of the 2020 census, the population was 567.

== Geography ==
Greenevers is located in southern Duplin County. North Carolina Highway 11 forms the western edge of the town; it leads north 10 miles (16 km) to Kenansville, the county seat, and southwest 7 miles (11 km) to Wallace. Interstate 40 is 3 miles (5 km) to the west by West Charity Road and 4 miles (6 km) to the southwest via NC 11.

According to the United States Census Bureau, the town has a total area of 1.6 square miles (4.1 km^{2}), all land.

== Demographics ==
Historical population
Census	Pop.	Note	%±
1970	424		—
1980	477		12.5%
1990	512		7.3%
2000	560		9.4%
2010	634		13.2%
2020	567		−10.6%
U.S. Decennial Census

=== 2020 census ===
Greenevers racial composition
Race	Number	Percentage
White (non-Hispanic)	31	5.47%
Black or African American (non-Hispanic)	408	71.96%
Native American	1	0.18%
Other/Mixed	10	1.76%
Hispanic or Latino	117	20.63%

As of the 2020 United States census, there were 567 people, 293 households, and 180 families residing in the town.

=== 2000 census ===
As of the census of 2000, there were 560 people, 210 households, and 140 families residing in the town. The population density was 348.0 inhabitants per square mile (134.4/km^{2}). There were 236 housing units at an average density of 146.6 per square mile (56.6/km^{2}). The racial makeup of the town was 9.46% White, 85.18% African American, 0.71% Asian, 4.29% from other races, and 0.36% from two or more races. Hispanic or Latino of any race were 7.50% of the population.

There were 210 households, out of which 35.7% had children under the age of 18 living with them, 28.1% were married couples living together, 31.0% had a female householder with no husband present, and 32.9% were non-families. 30.5% of all households were made up of individuals, and 9.0% had someone living alone who was 65 years of age or older. The average household size was 2.67 and the average family size was 3.31.

In the town, the population was spread out, with 34.8% under the age of 18, 9.8% from 18 to 24, 23.8% from 25 to 44, 21.4% from 45 to 64, and 10.2% who were 65 years of age or older. The median age was 29 years. For every 100 females, there were 78.9 males. For every 100 females age 18 and over, there were 73.0 males.

The median income for a household in the town was $19,000, and the median income for a family was $20,417. Males had a median income of $25,625 versus $21,250 for females. The per capita income for the town was $8,380. About 41.7% of families and 43.1% of the population were below the poverty line, including 52.1% of those under age 18 and 50.8% of those age 65 or over.
