= Calypso, North Carolina =

- Town
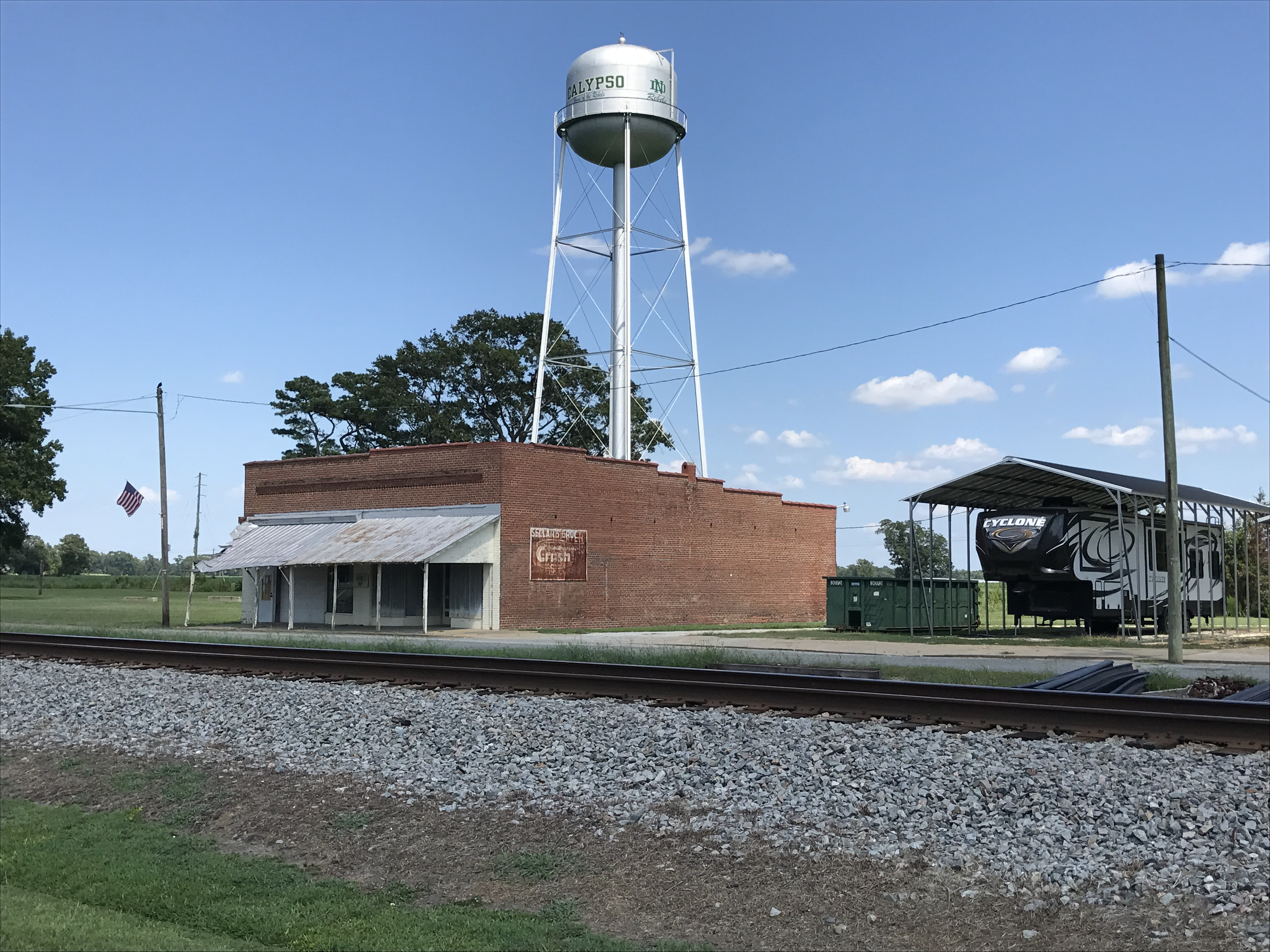

- Location within the state of North Carolina
- Coordinates: 35°09′16″N 78°06′16″W
- Country: United States
- State: North Carolina
- County: Duplin

Area
  - Total: 1.00 sq mi (2.60 km^{2})
  - Land: 1.00 sq mi (2.59 km^{2})
  - Water: 0 sq mi (0.00 km^{2})
- Elevation: 161 ft (49 m)

Population (2020)
  - Total: 327
  - Density: 326.6/sq mi (126.12/km^{2})
- Time zone: UTC-5 (Eastern (EST))
  - Summer (DST): UTC-4 (EDT)
- ZIP code: 28325
- Area code: 919
- FIPS code: 37-09760
- GNIS feature ID: 2405366
- Website: https://www.townofcalypsonc.org/

Calypso is a town in Duplin County, North Carolina, United States. At the 2020 census, the population was 327.

== History ==
The Bryan Whitfield Herring Farm was listed on the National Register of Historic Places in 2001.

== Geography ==
Calypso is located in northwestern Duplin County. U.S. Route 117 passes through the town, leading northeast 4 miles (6 km) to Mount Olive and 18 miles (29 km) to Goldsboro, and south 3 miles (5 km) to Faison and 11 miles (18 km) to Warsaw. U.S. Route 117 Connector leads southwest 5 miles (8 km) to Interstate 40 at a point 70 miles (110 km) north of Wilmington and 58 miles (93 km) south of Raleigh.

According to the U.S. Census Bureau, Calypso has a total area of 1.0 square mile (2.6 km^{2}), all land.

== Demographics ==
Historical population
Census	Pop.	Note	%±
1920	405		—
1930	538		32.8%
1940	678		26.0%
1950	688		1.5%
1960	633		−8.0%
1970	462		−27.0%
1980	689		49.1%
1990	481		−30.2%
2000	410		−14.8%
2010	538		31.2%
2020	327		−39.2%
U.S. Decennial Census

As of the census of 2000, there were 410 people, 178 households, and 111 families residing in the town. The population density was 422.7 inhabitants per square mile (163.2/km^{2}). There were 204 housing units at an average density of 210.3 per square mile (81.2/km^{2}). The racial makeup of the town was 71.71% White, 22.93% African American, 0.49% Native American, 0.49% Asian, 3.17% from other races, and 1.22% from two or more races. Hispanic or Latino of any race were 4.39% of the population.

There were 178 households, out of which 24.7% had children under the age of 18 living with them, 50.6% were married couples living together, 12.4% had a female householder with no husband present, and 37.1% were non-families. 28.7% of all households were made up of individuals, and 17.4% had someone living alone who was 65 years of age or older. The average household size was 2.30 and the average family size was 2.87.

In the town, the population was spread out, with 21.0% under the age of 18, 6.6% from 18 to 24, 26.6% from 25 to 44, 24.1% from 45 to 64, and 21.7% who were 65 years of age or older. The median age was 41 years. For every 100 females, there were 92.5 males. For every 100 females age 18 and over, there were 94.0 males.

The median income for a household in the town was $26,667, and the median income for a family was $31,875. Males had a median income of $25,865 versus $19,583 for females. The per capita income for the town was $13,244. About 12.5% of families and 14.9% of the population were below the poverty line, including 20.9% of those under age 18 and 14.6% of those age 65 or over.
