= Interstate 795 (North Carolina) =

Highway in North Carolina

Interstate 795
- I-795 highlighted in red and Future I-795 highlighted in blue

Route information
- Auxiliary route of I-95
- Maintained by NCDOT
- Length: 25.46 mi (40.97 km)
- Existed: 2007–present
- NHS: Entire route

Major junctions
- South end: US 70 in Goldsboro
- I-42 near Goldsboro; US 301 in Wilson; I-587 / US 264 in Wilson
- North end: I-95 / I-587 / US 264 near Wilson

Location
- Country: United States
- State: North Carolina
- Counties: Wayne, Wilson

Highway system
- Interstate Highway System; Main; Auxiliary; Suffixed; Business; Future; North Carolina Highway System; Interstate; US; State; Scenic
← I-785	→ NC 801

Interstate 795 (I-795) is a 25.49-mile (41.02 km) auxiliary Interstate Highway in the US state of North Carolina. It connects the city of Goldsboro to I-95 just south of Wilson, paralleling the northern portion of US Route 117 (US 117). The road runs a five-mile (8.0 km) concurrency with US 264 and I-587 in the last section of the route. It serves as a primary freeway spur for the city of Goldsboro to the Interstate Highway System, as well part of a major cargo route for the cities of Down East, which was a part of the impetus for its designation in 2007. Future plans call for the interstate to be further extended southward to meet I-40 near Faison.

I-795 began in 2007 as a renumbering of the US 117 freeway. Since oversized trucks could not use US 117, the state decided to get the road approved for Interstate designation. On September 28, 2007, the American Association of State Highway and Transportation Officials (AASHTO) decided to approve the I-795 designation. The state quickly began to renumber mileposts, update signs, and move US 117 back to its original designation. In 2008, major flaws in the surface of the highway began to develop. The thin road surface had begun to deteriorate mainly because of heavy truck use. The pavement was found to have flaws along the entire route and the Federal Highway Administration (FHWA) decided that the highway should be resurfaced adding an extra 2.5 to 3 inches (6.4 to 7.6 cm) to the surface. The project of resurfacing the road was completed in 2010 and was later awarded the Sheldon G. Hayes Award for the best highway construction project and the smoothest road of 2011.

== Route description ==
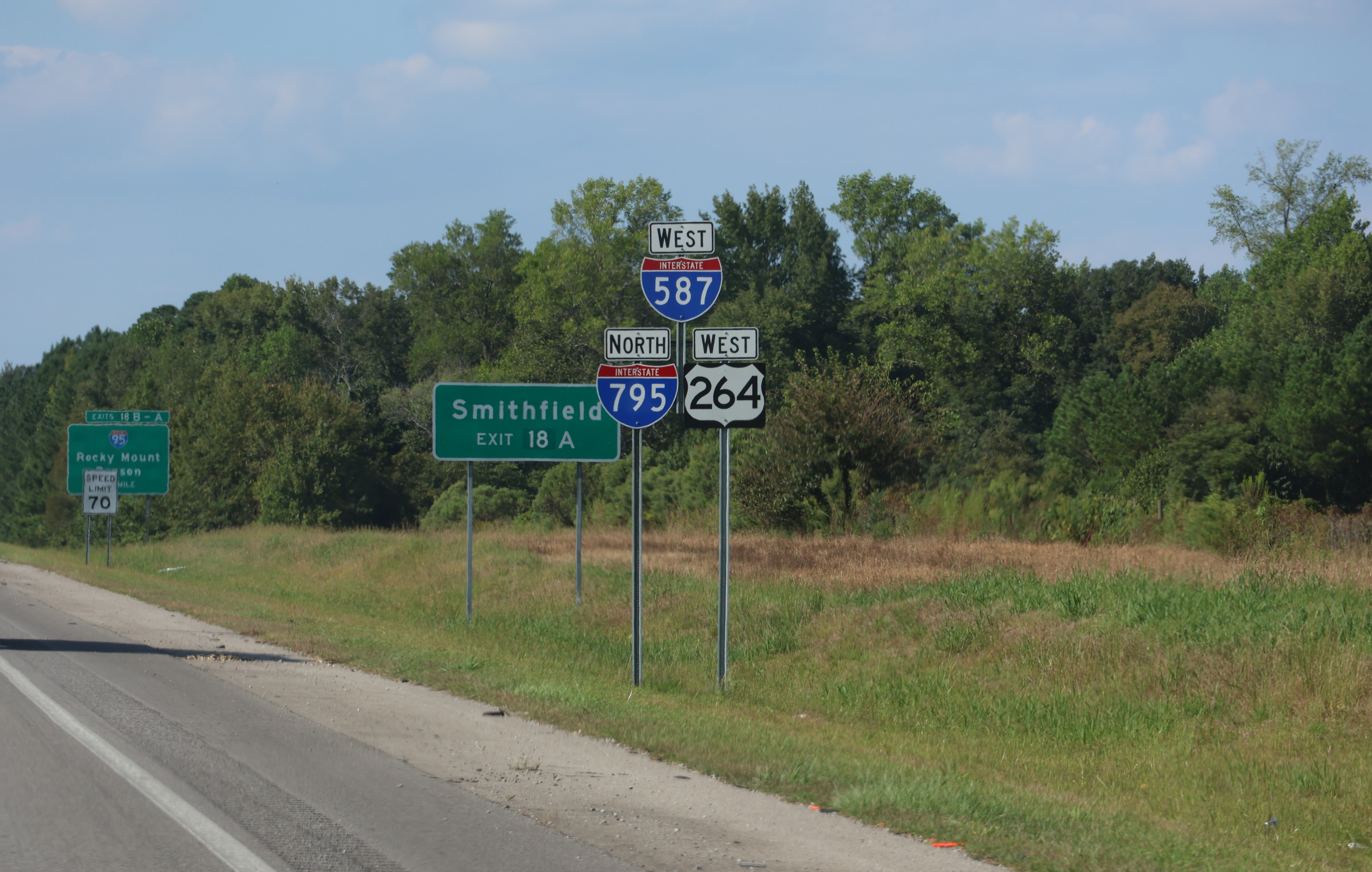
I-587/I-795/US 264 shields in Wilson County, September 2023

I-795 begins at an interchange with US 70 in Goldsboro. From there, the highway begins to head north through the northern parts of Goldsboro. The road passes Lane Tree Golf Course before having an interchange with I-42. After the I-42 interchange, I-795 begins to pass through the northern neighborhoods of Goldsboro before entering the eastern North Carolina countryside. Just after leaving Goldsboro, the highway bypasses the small town of Pikeville. The highway runs along the western edge of the town. I-795 has an interchange with Pikeville–Princeton Road before leaving the Pikeville area. As the highway begins to get closer to Wilson it bears to the west once again to bypass Fremont, another small town north of Goldsboro. I-795 has an interchange with North Carolina Highway 222 (NC 222) The road continues to head north paralleling US 117 as it leaves the town.

As the Interstate continues through the rural area between Wilson and Goldsboro, it has an interchange with County Road 1643 (Alton Road) near milemarker 9. The highway continues north for about four more miles (6.4 km) before having another interchange with US 301. Shortly after the US 301 interchange, I-795 merges with I-587 and US 264 heading west. The four-lane highway runs along the southern parts of Wilson which is very rural. The joint highway has an interchange with Downing Street (exit 42) west of the Downing Village neighborhood. As it continues west, it crosses over Mill branch before having an interchange with NC 42 (exit 40) south of the Planters Trail neighborhood in the very rural south west area of Wilson. The road turns to the northwest to meet I-95 just a mile (1.6 km) to the west. I-795 (along with I-587) ends at I-95 at a cloverleaf interchange. The freeway continues to the west of the interchange as US 264.

== History ==
=== Beginnings as US 117 freeway ===
I-795 began as a new freeway alignment for US 117 completed in 2006, splitting from the old Goldsboro bypass (which still carries US 13) and paralleling the old two-lane US 117 roadway to the US 264 bypass south of Wilson. AASHTO approved an extension of US 117, overlapping US 264 to I-95, at their October 11, 2002, meeting. However, the 1982 Surface Transportation Assistance Act (STAA) specifies that trucks over 48 feet (15 m) in length, including the industry-standard 53-foot (16 m) trailers, can only use Interstates and other routes approved by the state, which included US 70 but not US 117.

=== Push for Interstate designation ===
Rather than go through the time-consuming process to add the route to the STAA system, the state decided to get it approved as an Interstate. The FHWA informed the North Carolina Department of Transportation (NCDOT) that it would not approve the addition until a construction contract to correct a "high accident wet weather location" on the US 264 portion was underway. Immediately after the response from the FHWA, NCDOT added the project (W-5007) to the state Transportation Improvement Plan, but AASHTO denied the I-795 numbering at their May 4, 2007, meeting, citing concerns about the south end not being at another Interstate and the lack of FHWA approval. However, AASHTO decided at their September 28 meeting to give conditional approval, pending FHWA concurrence. The North Carolina State Highway Patrol, which had begun ticketing overlength truckers on US 117 in mid-2007, stopped enforcing the ban on October 3, due to the AASHTO decision. The first I-795 signs were posted on November 28, 2007, replacing US 117 signs along the whole route. Most but not all signage at the interchange onramps was updated at the same time. Other changes, including shifting US 117 back to the old route and changing exit numbers and mileposts, were to be completed by early 2008, but complications with the road surface and approval of moving US 117 delayed those plans to December 2009.

=== Problems with road surface and their remediation ===
In 2008, shortly after the road received the I-795 designation, major flaws developed in the route's paving surface. Though rated for a 15-year lifespan, the pavement began to deteriorate after only 16 months of use. During the planning of the road, as early as 2003, some engineers had warned that the thin pavement would be inadequate for heavy truck traffic. However, most NCDOT officials deemed a thicker road surface too expensive, as it would have added approximately $2.8 million (equivalent to $4.69 million in 2025) to the cost of the road. At first, replacing sections that were damaged was expected to cost $1.6 million (equivalent to $2.35 million in 2025), with estimates for resurfacing the entire road running as high as $10 million (equivalent to $14.7 million in 2025). The FHWA sent an engineering team to examine the road in its entirety in the middle of 2008. They found flaws in the pavement in the entire highway, not just those already damaged between US 117 milemarkers 85 and 92. They recommended the entire asphalt surface be replaced with an additional 2.5 to 3.0 inches (6.4 to 7.6 cm) added to the width, at a cost between $15 million and $22 million (equivalent to $22 million and $32.3 million in 2025). Meanwhile, NCDOT started repairing the damaged portion of the road surface in October 2008, a process that was completed in about a month and cost around $600,000 (equivalent to $880,000 in 2025). The new state secretary of transportation, Gene Conti, said he would make a decision, taking the FHWA report into consideration, once he took office in early 2009. He decided to abide by most recommendations of the report and announced in mid-2009 that a contract would be let that October with the project starting as early as November 2009. The work, to fix the right lanes first, then put a finishing layer on all lanes, was completed in November 2010. In 2012, the National Asphalt Pavement Association awarded the repaired eight-mile (13 km) segment the Sheldon G. Hayes Award, recognizing it as the best highway construction project and the smoothest road of 2011.

=== Goldsboro Bypass ===
I-795 formerly served as the temporary west end of the new Goldsboro Bypass Freeway (NC 44, now I-42). The 3.9-mile (6.3 km), four-lane divided highway was opened on December 16, 2011, and connects I-795 with Wayne Memorial Drive north of Goldsboro. The highway temporarily designated NC 44. On May 27, 2016, the 20-mile (32 km) bypass was completed, and NC 44 signs were removed and was resigned as US 70 Byp. In September 2024, the bypass changed designations once again to Interstate 42. The bypass now runs from its west end at US 70 from just west of NC 581 in Wayne County east to end at US 70 just east of Promise Land Road in Lenoir County, entirely part of I-42.

== Future ==
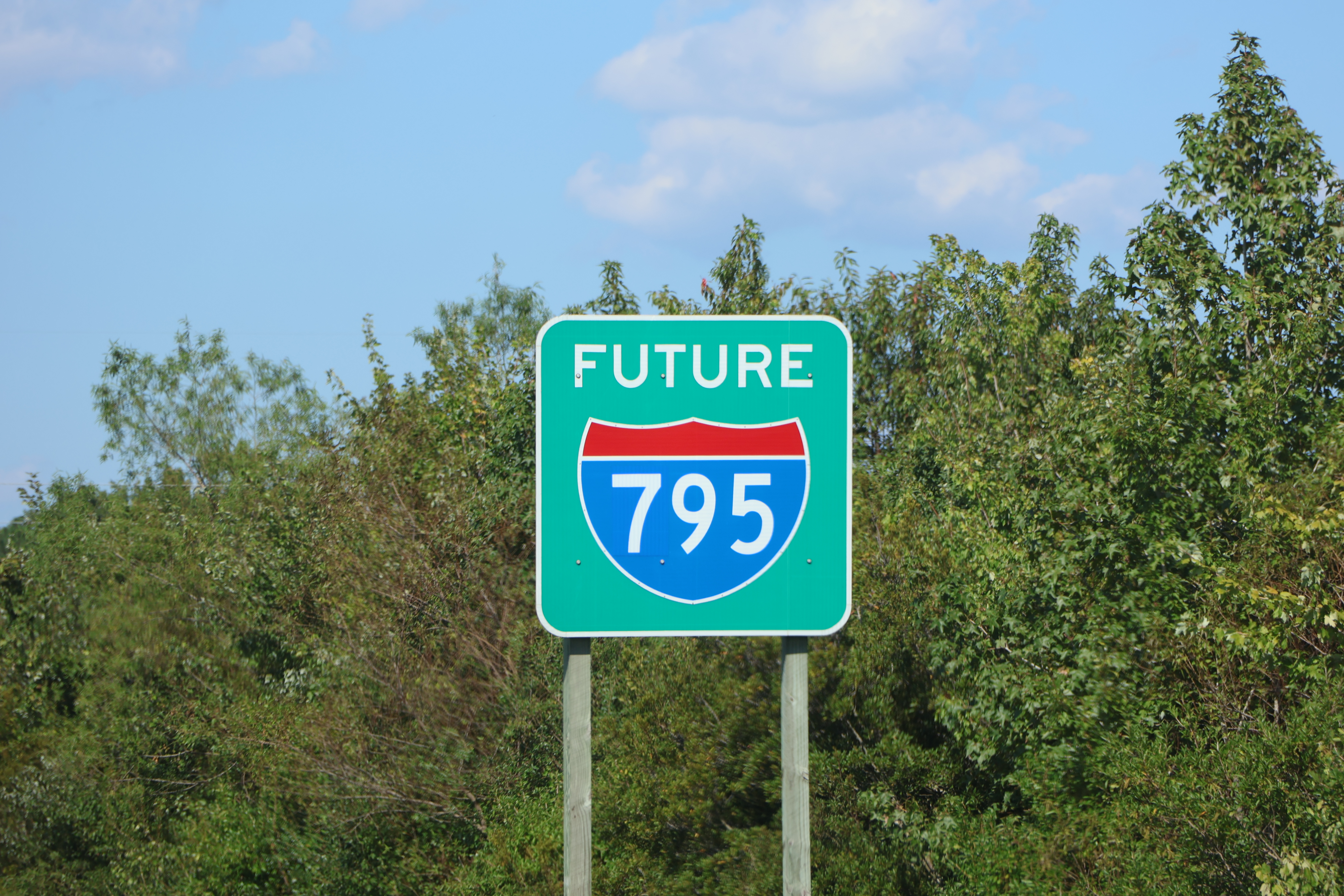
"Future I-795" sign along northbound US 117 in Wayne County, September 2023

In 2012, the Eastern North Carolina NPO/RPO coalition proposed a southern extension of I-795 from its current terminus, south along US 117 and NC 403 to I-40 near Faison. In January 2004, a feasibility studied the idea of extending the US 117 Freeway (I-795) south from its current US 70 terminus to US 13. The Strategic Highway Plan list the Wilson–Wilmington Corridor as Corridor 50 and indicates the need to improve US 117 south of Goldsboro to a four-lane divided-access freeway. A study will include US 117 from US 13 to the boundary of the Goldsboro MPO. Currently US 117 between I-40 and Goldsboro is not at freeway grade, and many at-grade crossings would have to become interchanges or be eliminated. As of early 2018, the southward extension of I-795 along the US 117 corridor to I-40 near Faison is the US Department of Transportation's High Priority Corridor #81.

Public hearings were held in November and December 2018 for the plan to upgrade the four-lane US 117 to Interstate standards to I-40.

== Exit list ==
County	Location	mi	km	Exit (Note: Though exits on I-795/US 264 section use US 264 mileposts, I-795 exits are listed in 2011–2012 NCDOT State Transportation Map.)	Destinations	Notes
Wayne	Goldsboro	25.41	40.89	—	To US 117 south (NC 581 Conn.) – Wilmington	Continuation as NC 581 Conn.
Wayne	Goldsboro	25.41	40.89	25	US 70 to US 13 – Smithfield, Raleigh, Kinston	Signed as exits 25A (west) and 25B (east) southbound; no exit number northbound
Wayne	Goldsboro	22.12	35.60	22	I-42 (Goldsboro Bypass)	exit 39 on I-42
Wayne	Pikeville	20.45	32.91	18	Main Street – Pikeville	
Wayne	Fremont	16.09	25.89	14	NC 222 – Fremont, Kenly	
Wilson		8.77	14.11	9	Alton Road – Black Creek, Lucama	
Wilson		5.10	8.21	5	US 301 to I-587 / US 264 east – Wilson, Kenly, Smithfield	
Wilson		4.10	6.60	—	I-587 / US 264 east – Greenville	East end of I-587 and US 264 overlap; southbound exit and northbound entrance; I-587 exit 23
Wilson		3.80	6.12	22	Downing Road –Wilson	Exit numbers follow I-587
Wilson	Wilson	1.19	1.92	20	NC 42 – Wilson, Clayton	
Wilson	Wilson	0.00	0.00	18	I-95 / I-587 begins – Benson, Rocky Mount	Northern terminus; northern end of the I-587 and US 264 overlap; western terminus of I-587; signed as exits 18A (south) and 18B (north); I-95 exit 119
Wilson	Wilson	0.00	0.00	—	US 264 west – Raleigh	Continuation as US 264
1.000 mi = 1.609 km; 1.000 km = 0.621 mi: Concurrency terminus
