= Watha, North Carolina =

- Town
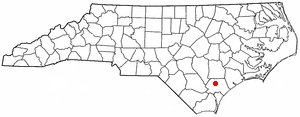
- Location within the U.S. state of North Carolina
- Coordinates: 34°39′04″N 77°57′27″W
- Country: United States
- State: North Carolina
- County: Pender

Area
  - Total: 1.36 sq mi (3.52 km^{2})
  - Land: 1.36 sq mi (3.52 km^{2})
  - Water: 0 sq mi (0.00 km^{2})
- Elevation: 59 ft (18 m)

Population (2020)
  - Total: 181
  - Density: 133/sq mi (51.4/km^{2})
- Time zone: UTC-5 (Eastern (EST))
  - Summer (DST): UTC-4 (EDT)
- ZIP code: 28478
- Area codes: 910, 472
- FIPS code: 37-71320
- GNIS feature ID: 2406840
- Website: https://townofwathanc.com/

Watha is a town in Pender County, North Carolina, United States. The population was 181 at the 2020 census. It is part of the Wilmington Metropolitan Statistical Area.

== History ==
Watha was incorporated in 1909. The town was initially called South Washington it was changed because their mail was being delivered to another town in the state named Washington was causing mail to be sent incorrectly. In 1926 a fire destroyed most of the town and severely damaged the original Pender County courthouse

== Geography ==
According to the United States Census Bureau, the town has a total area of 0.9 square miles (2.3 km^{2}), all land.

== Demographics ==
Historical population
Census	Pop.	Note	%±
1910	169		—
1920	181		7.1%
1930	227		25.4%
1940	214		−5.7%
1950	222		3.7%
1960	174		−21.6%
1970	181		4.0%
1980	196		8.3%
1990	99		−49.5%
2000	151		52.5%
2010	190		25.8%
2020	181		−4.7%
2023 (est.)	210	▲	16.0%
U.S. Decennial Census

As of the census of 2000, there were 151 people, 65 households, and 44 families residing in the town. The population density was 165.6 inhabitants per square mile (63.9/km^{2}). There were 71 housing units at an average density of 77.9 per square mile (30.1/km^{2}). The racial makeup of the town was 90.07% White, 8.61% African American, 0.66% from other races, and 0.66% from two or more races. Hispanic or Latino of any race were 0.66% of the population.

There were 65 households, out of which 24.6% had children under the age of 18 living with them, 56.9% were married couples living together, 7.7% had a female householder with no husband present, and 30.8% were non-families. 26.2% of all households were made up of individuals, and 15.4% had someone living alone who was 65 years of age or older. The average household size was 2.32 and the average family size was 2.82.

In the town, the population was spread out, with 17.9% under the age of 18, 9.3% from 18 to 24, 21.2% from 25 to 44, 29.8% from 45 to 64, and 21.9% who were 65 years of age or older. The median age was 46 years. For every 100 females, there were 101.3 males. For every 100 females age 18 and over, there were 100.0 males.

The median income for a household in the town was $37,500, and the median income for a family was $45,625. Males had a median income of $31,250 versus $17,083 for females. The per capita income for the town was $15,654. There were 7.7% of families and 9.8% of the population living below the poverty line, including 12.0% of under eighteens and 18.2% of those over 64.
