= Newton Grove, North Carolina =

- Town
- Nickname: Circle City
- Motto: "Circle of Opportunity"
- Location within the state of North Carolina
- Coordinates: 35°14′43″N 78°21′16″W
- Country: United States
- State: North Carolina
- County: Sampson

Area
  - Total: 3.10 sq mi (8.02 km^{2})
  - Land: 3.08 sq mi (7.98 km^{2})
  - Water: 0.015 sq mi (0.04 km^{2})
- Elevation: 187 ft (57 m)

Population (2020)
  - Total: 585
  - Density: 189.8/sq mi (73.29/km^{2})
- Time zone: UTC-5 (Eastern (EST))
  - Summer (DST): UTC-4 (EDT)
- ZIP code: 28366
- Area codes: 910, 472
- FIPS code: 37-47020
- GNIS feature ID: 2406990
- Website: www.newtongrove.net

Newton Grove is a town in Sampson County, North Carolina, United States. It was chartered in 1879. The population was 585 at the 2020 census.

Newton Grove is located 18 miles north of Clinton.

== History ==
The town of Newton Grove was first incorporated in 1879 as the New Town at the Grove, because of the prominent oak grove, then again in 1935 as Newton Grove. A mayor and five commissioners make up the government of Newton Grove.

Early courthouse records of Sampson County show that the Newton Grove post office was once known as Blackman's Store. Another post office six miles west of Newton Grove was known as Blackman's Mills from 1858 to 1914. The Blackman family were affluent planters who settled in the area in the early 18th century. They were descendants of Jeremiah Blackman, mariner of London who captained several ships that brought English settlers to the Colony of Virginia in the 17th century.

Thirteen Oaks and the Isaac Williams House are listed on the National Register of Historic Places.

== Geography ==
According to the United States Census Bureau, the town has a total area of 3.1 square miles (8.0 km^{2}), of which 3.1 square miles (8.0 km^{2}) is land and 0.04 square miles (0.10 km^{2}) (0.65%) is water.

There is a six-way roundabout in the center of town, with a hexagonal loop road around it, named Circle Street, contrary to its shape.

== Demographics ==
Historical population
| Census | Pop. | Note | %± |
|---|---|---|---|
| 1880 | 61 | | — |
| 1890 | 63 | | 3.3% |
| 1900 | 75 | | 19.0% |
| 1910 | 73 | | −2.7% |
| 1920 | 125 | | 71.2% |
| 1930 | 150 | | 20.0% |
| 1940 | 339 | | 126.0% |
| 1950 | 374 | | 10.3% |
| 1960 | 477 | | 27.5% |
| 1970 | 546 | | 14.5% |
| 1980 | 564 | | 3.3% |
| 1990 | 511 | | −9.4% |
| 2000 | 606 | | 18.6% |
| 2010 | 569 | | −6.1% |
| 2020 | 585 | | 2.8% |
U.S. Decennial Census

=== 2020 census ===
Newton Grove racial composition
| Race | Number | Percentage |
|---|---|---|
| White (non-Hispanic) | 400 | 68.38% |
| Black or African American (non-Hispanic) | 80 | 13.68% |
| Native American | 4 | 0.68% |
| Asian | 4 | 0.68% |
| Other/Mixed | 19 | 3.25% |
| Hispanic or Latino | 78 | 13.33% |

As of the 2020 United States census, there were 585 people, 249 households, and 154 families residing in the town.

=== 2000 census ===
As of the census of 2000, there were 606 people, 223 households, and 152 families residing in the town. The population density was 197.2 inhabitants per square mile (76.1/km^{2}). There were 240 housing units at an average density of 78.1 per square mile (30.2/km^{2}). The racial makeup of the town was 77.72% White, 11.39% African American, 0.50% Native American, 0.17% Asian, 8.75% from other races, and 1.49% from two or more races. Hispanic or Latino of any race were 14.19% of the population.

There were 223 households, out of which 26.0% had children under the age of 18 living with them, 54.3% were married couples living together, 11.2% had a female householder with no husband present, and 31.8% were non-families. 30.0% of all households were made up of individuals, and 14.3% had someone living alone who was 65 years of age or older. The average household size was 2.55 and the average family size was 3.15.

In the town, the population was spread out, with 20.6% under the age of 18, 9.6% from 18 to 24, 25.4% from 25 to 44, 21.8% from 45 to 64, and 22.6% who were 65 years of age or older. The median age was 42 years. For every 100 females, there were 85.3 males. For every 100 females age 18 and over, there were 82.9 males.

The median income for a household in the town was $35,000, and the median income for a family was $51,250. Males had a median income of $31,667 versus $37,750 for females. The per capita income for the town was $19,295. About 7.0% of families and 11.1% of the population were below the poverty line, including 10.3% of those under age 18 and 14.3% of those age 65 or over.

== Education ==
Newton Grove is home to Hobbton High School, a small 1A division school established in 1957.
