= Wayne Executive Jetport =

- IATA: none; ICAO: KGWW; FAA LID: GWW

Summary
- Airport type: Public
- Owner: Wayne County
- Serves: Goldsboro, North Carolina
- Elevation AMSL: 134 ft / 41 m
- Coordinates: 35°27′38″N 077°57′54″W

Map

Runways
Direction	Length		Surface
Direction	ft	m	Surface
5/23	5,501	1,677	Asphalt

Statistics (2023)
- Aircraft operations (year ending 5/12/2023): 16,200
- Based aircraft: 48
- Source: Federal Aviation Administration

Wayne Executive Jetport (ICAO: KGWW, FAA LID: GWW) is a public use airport located in Pikeville, NC, three miles north of Goldsboro, in Wayne County, North Carolina. The airport is owned by Wayne County. It was formerly Goldsboro-Wayne Municipal Airport, when it was owned by both City of Goldsboro and Wayne County.

The Jetport is governed by the Wayne Executive Jetport (WEJP) Commission, which assists the county with management and development at the Jetport. The WEJP Commission consists of seven members, each serving a two-year term as appointed by the Wayne County Commissioners, along with one member from the Board of County Commissioners. Each January the WEJP Board elects the chair and Vice Chair leadership positions for the year.

Based on 2020 economic data, the Wayne Executive Jetport provides $1,800,000 in tax revenue to the local area, 345 jobs are supported, $58,200,000 local economic impact, and over 16,200 annual operations are conducted. There is a population of over 215,000 living within 30 minutes of the Jetport.

Since July 2018 over $13,000,000 of investment has been made at the Jetport expanding the facility and operations.

In 2020 The executive director of the WEJP was presented with the General Aviation Manager of the Year award for the Southern region of the FAA.

Many U.S. airports use the same three-letter location identifier for the FAA and IATA. However, this airport is assigned GWW by the FAA but has no designation from the IATA. The GWW code is not currently used by the IATA, but it was previously assigned to the former RAF Gatow in Berlin, Germany.

== Facilities ==
The airport covers 249 acres (101 ha) at an elevation of 134 feet (41 m). Its single runway, 5/23, is 5,501 by 100 feet (1,677 x 30 m) asphalt.

In the year ending May 12, 2023, the airport had 16,200 aircraft operations, average 44 per day: 81% general aviation, 12% air taxi, and 6% military. 48 aircraft were then based at this airport: 39 single-engine, 5 multi-engine, and 4 helicopter.

== See also ==
- List of airports in North Carolina
