= National Register of Historic Places listings in Madison County, North Carolina =

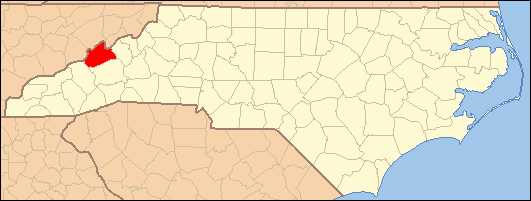

This list includes properties and districts listed on the National Register of Historic Places in Madison County, North Carolina. Click the "Map of all coordinates" link to the right to view an online map of all properties and districts with latitude and longitude coordinates in the table below.

== Current listings ==
This National Park Service list is complete through NPS recent listings posted September 4, 2026.

	Name on the Register	Image	Date listed	Location	City or town	Description
1	Bank of French Broad	Bank of French Broad	June 10, 2004 (#04000584)	100 Main St. 35°47′51″N 82°41′01″W	Marshall	
2	California Creek Missionary Baptist Church	California Creek Missionary Baptist Church	July 12, 1984 (#84002342)	US 23; 35°52′25″N 82°30′50″W	Mars Hill	
3	Capitola Manufacturing Company Cotton Yarn Mill	Capitola Manufacturing Company Cotton Yarn Mill	August 28, 2012 (#12000577)	Southeast end of Bridge No. 328 over French Broad River; 35°47′42″N 82°40′59″W	Marshall	
4	Dorland Memorial Presbyterian Church	Dorland Memorial Presbyterian Church	July 24, 1986 (#86001907)	Bridge St. at Meadow Ln. 35°53′32″N 82°49′43″W	Hot Springs	
5	William R. Ellerson House		September 11, 2018 (#100002929)	320 Gahagans Rd. 35°53′37″N 82°49′12″W	Hot Springs	
6	Gulf Oil Distribution Facility		September 8, 2026 (#100013394)	481 Rollins Road; 35°47′20″N 82°39′50″W	Marshall	
7	Hot Springs Historic District	Hot Springs Historic District	February 5, 2009 (#08001413)	Roughly bounded by Bridge St., Andrews Ave. S. and Meadow Ln. 35°53′32″N 82°49′41″W	Hot Springs	
8	Madison County Courthouse	Madison County Courthouse	May 10, 1979 (#79001732)	Main St. 35°47′52″N 82°41′02″W	Marshall	
9	Mars Hill Anderson Rosenwald School	Mars Hill Anderson Rosenwald School	May 31, 2018 (#100002519)	225 Mount Olive Dr. 35°48′23″N 82°32′29″W	Mars Hill	
10	Mars Hill College Historic District	Mars Hill College Historic District	September 12, 2006 (#06000865)	Bet. Bailey and Cascade Sts. N and S 35°49′36″N 82°33′02″W	Mars Hill	
11	Mars Hill Commercial Historic District	Mars Hill Commercial Historic District	September 8, 2015 (#15000575)	15 College, 2-14, 18, 24-26, 28-30, 32-34, 9, and 15-25 S. Main, and 10, 14, and 16-20 N. Main Sts. 35°49′38″N 82°32′55″W	Mars Hill	
12	Mars Hill High School	Mars Hill High School	September 7, 2005 (#05000962)	734 Bailey St. 35°50′06″N 82°33′09″W	Mars Hill	
13	Marshall High School	Marshall High School	August 13, 2008 (#08000779)	Blannahassett Island. W. side Bridge St. 35°47′46″N 82°41′12″W	Marshall	A boundary increase was approved January 14, 2025.
14	Marshall Main Street Historic District	Marshall Main Street Historic District	August 16, 2007 (#07000819)	101 N. Main St.- 165 S. Main St., Bridge St. and 33 Bailey's Branch Rd. 35°47′50″N 82°40′59″W	Marshall	
15	Thomas J. Murray House	Thomas J. Murray House	June 1, 2005 (#05000514)	Address Restricted	Mars Hill	
16	Henry Ottinger House		March 6, 1986 (#86000410)	391 Boys Home Rd. 35°54′35″N 82°51′13″W	Hot Springs	
17	Sunnybank	Sunnybank	May 23, 1980 (#80002883)	NC 209 and Walnut St. 35°53′29″N 82°49′47″W	Hot Springs	
18	James H. White House	James H. White House	December 21, 1989 (#89002136)	5 Hill St. 35°47′53″N 82°41′00″W	Marshall	
19	Jeff White House	Jeff White House	June 5, 1975 (#75001279)	Northeast of Marshall on NC 213; 35°49′09″N 82°38′48″W	Marshall	

== See also ==
- National Register of Historic Places listings in North Carolina
- List of National Historic Landmarks in North Carolina
