= National Register of Historic Places listings in North Carolina =

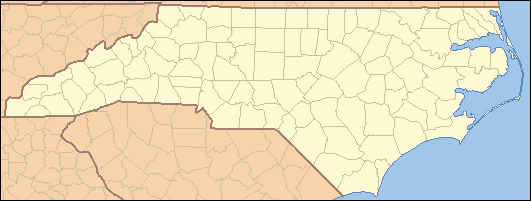

This is a list of structures, sites, districts, and objects on the National Register of Historic Places in North Carolina:

As of May 1, 2015, there are more than 2,900 properties and districts listed on the National Register of Historic Places in all 100 North Carolina counties, including 39 National Historic Landmarks, two National Historic Sites, one National Military Park, one National Memorial and one National Battlefield.

This National Park Service list is complete through NPS recent listings posted October 9, 2026.

== Current listings by county ==
The following are approximate tallies of current listings by county. These counts are based on entries in the National Register Information Database as of April 24, 2008 and new weekly listings posted since then on the National Register of Historic Places web site. There are frequent additions to the listings and occasional delistings and the counts here are approximate and not official. The counts in this table exclude boundary increase and decrease listings which modify the area covered by an existing property or district and which carry a separate National Register reference number.

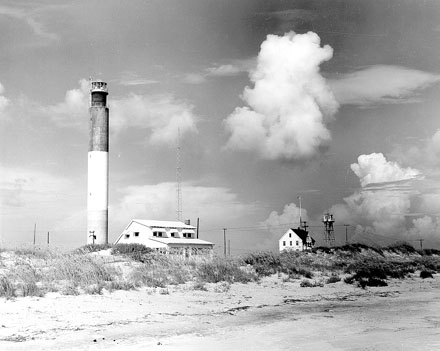
Oak Island Lighthouse, Caswell Beach

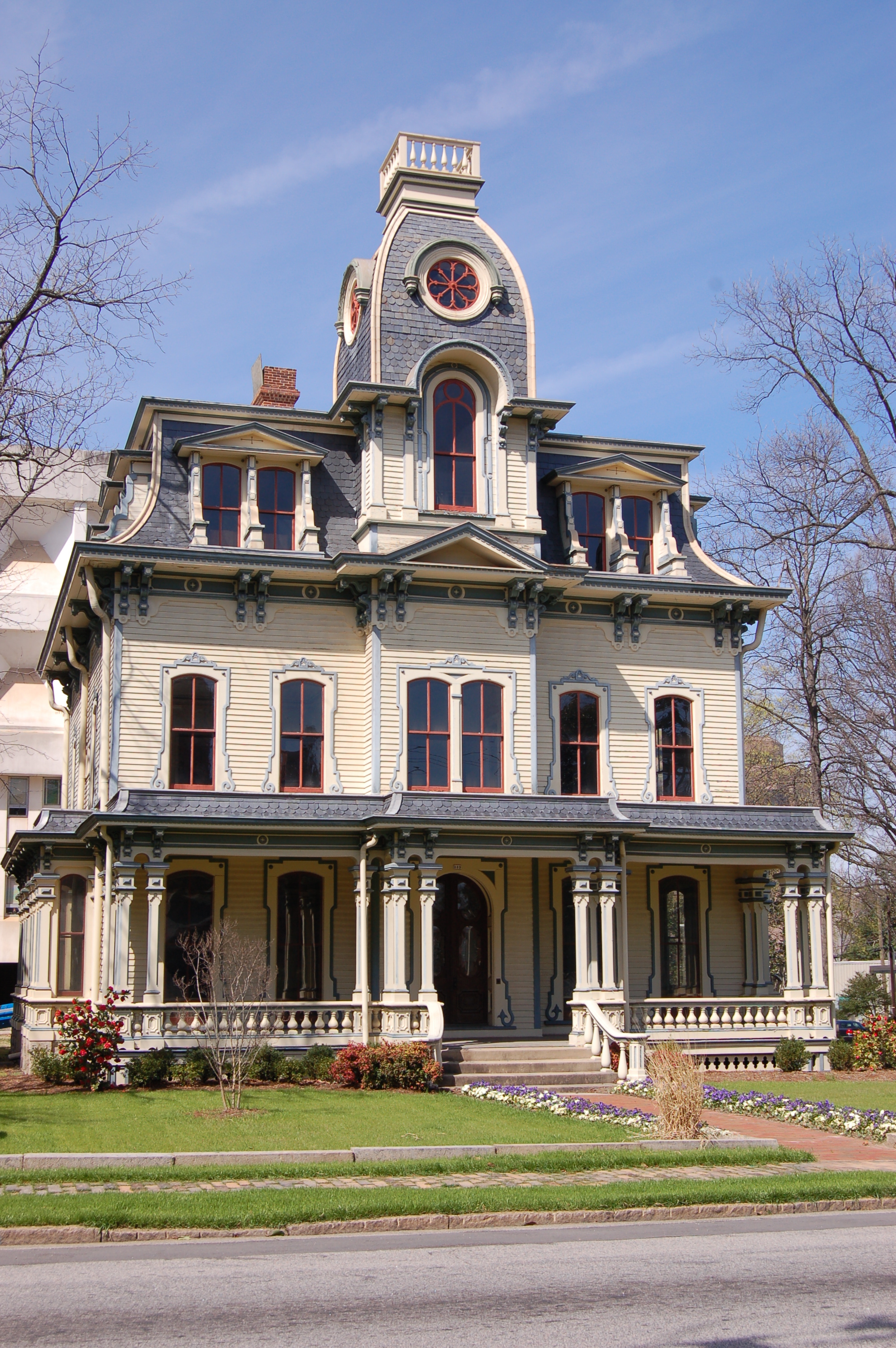
Heck-Andrews House, Raleigh

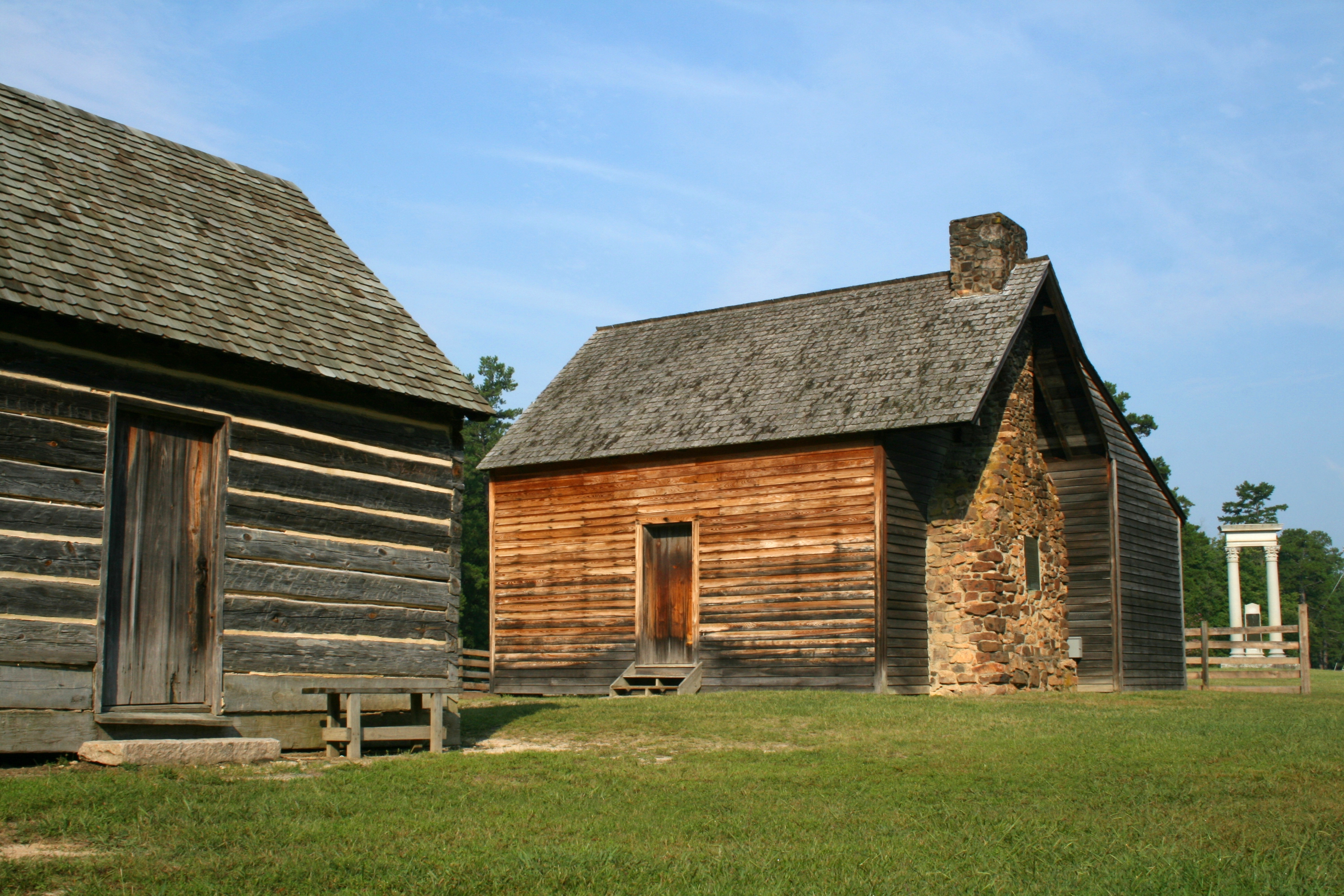
Bennett Place State Historic Site, Durham

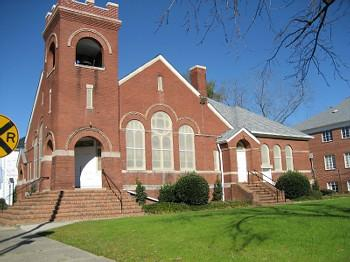
First Christian Church, Robersonville

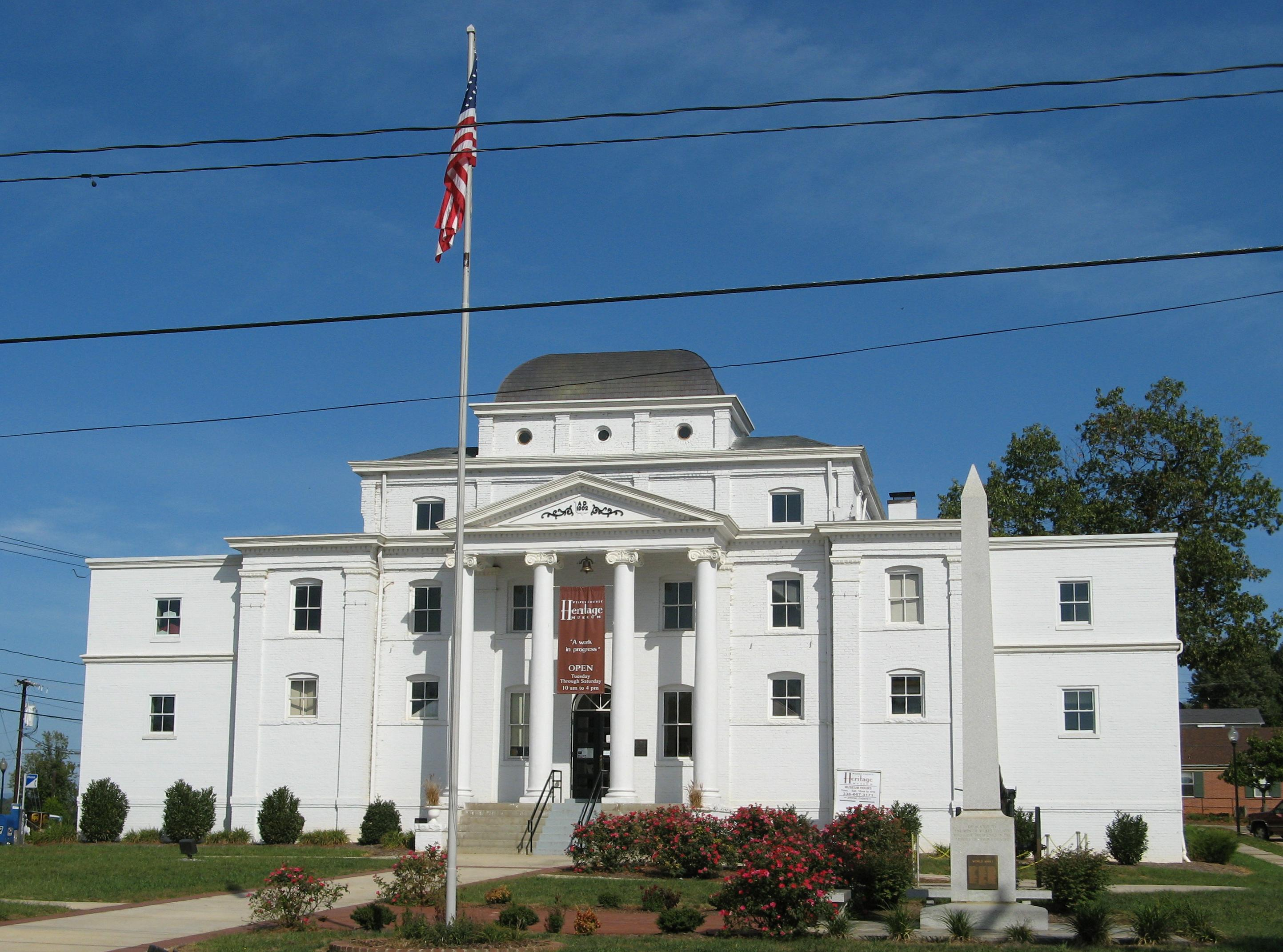
Wilkes County Courthouse, Wilkesboro

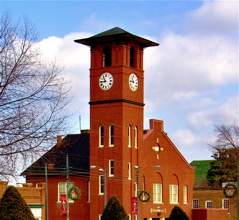
Henderson Fire Station and Municipal Building, Henderson

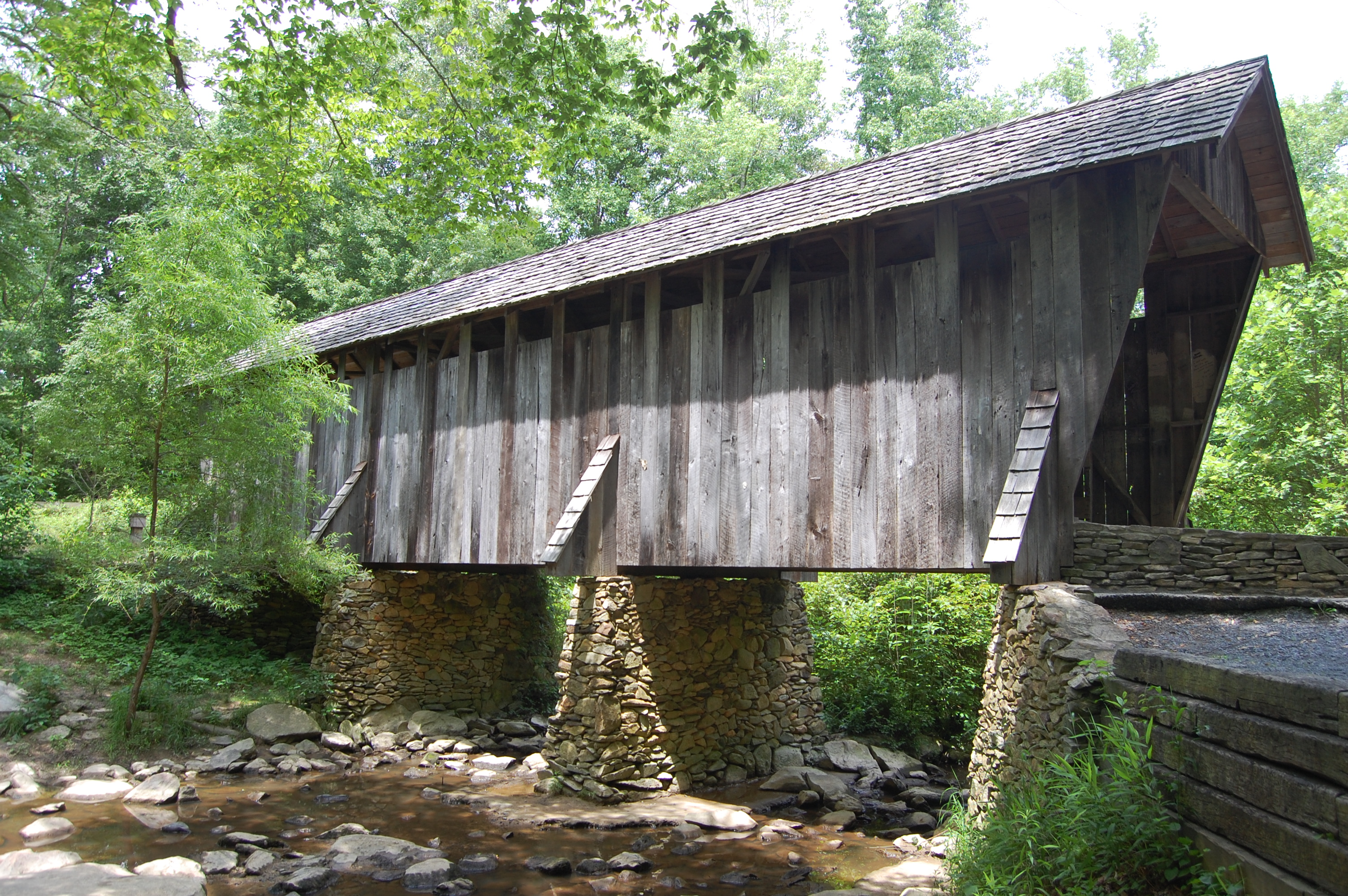
Pisgah Community Covered Bridge, Pisgah

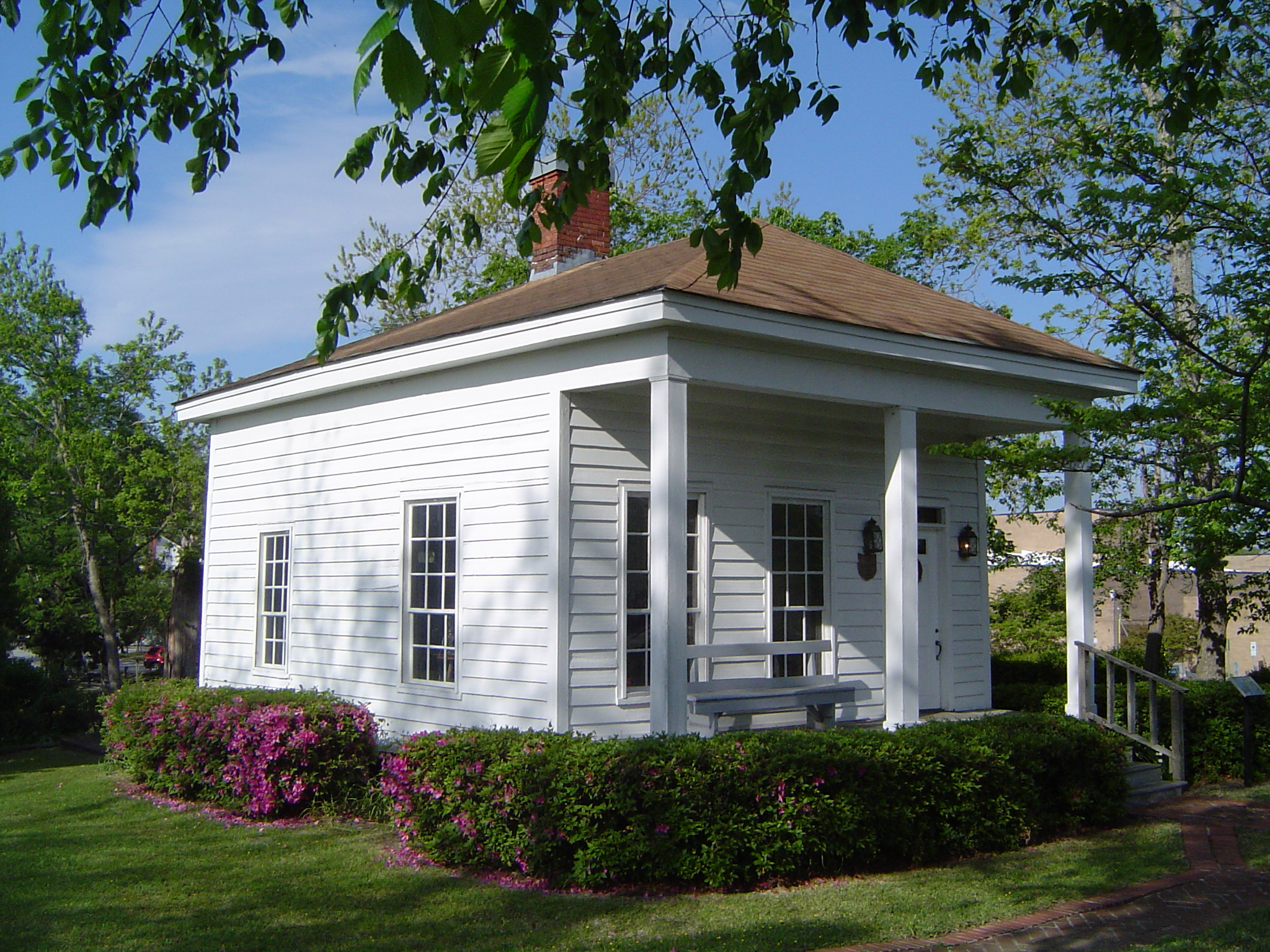
Pelletier House, Jacksonville

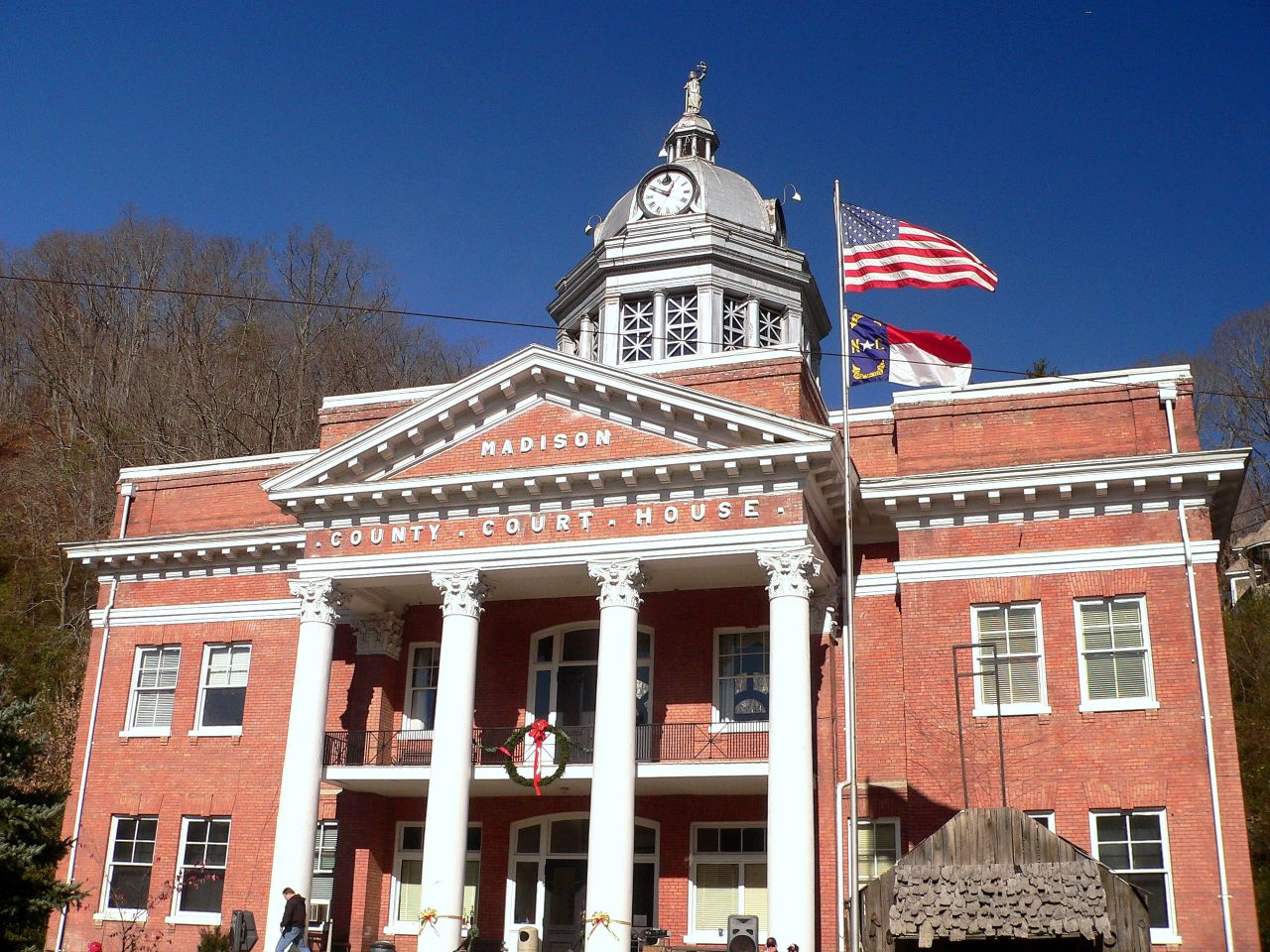
Madison County Courthouse, Marshall

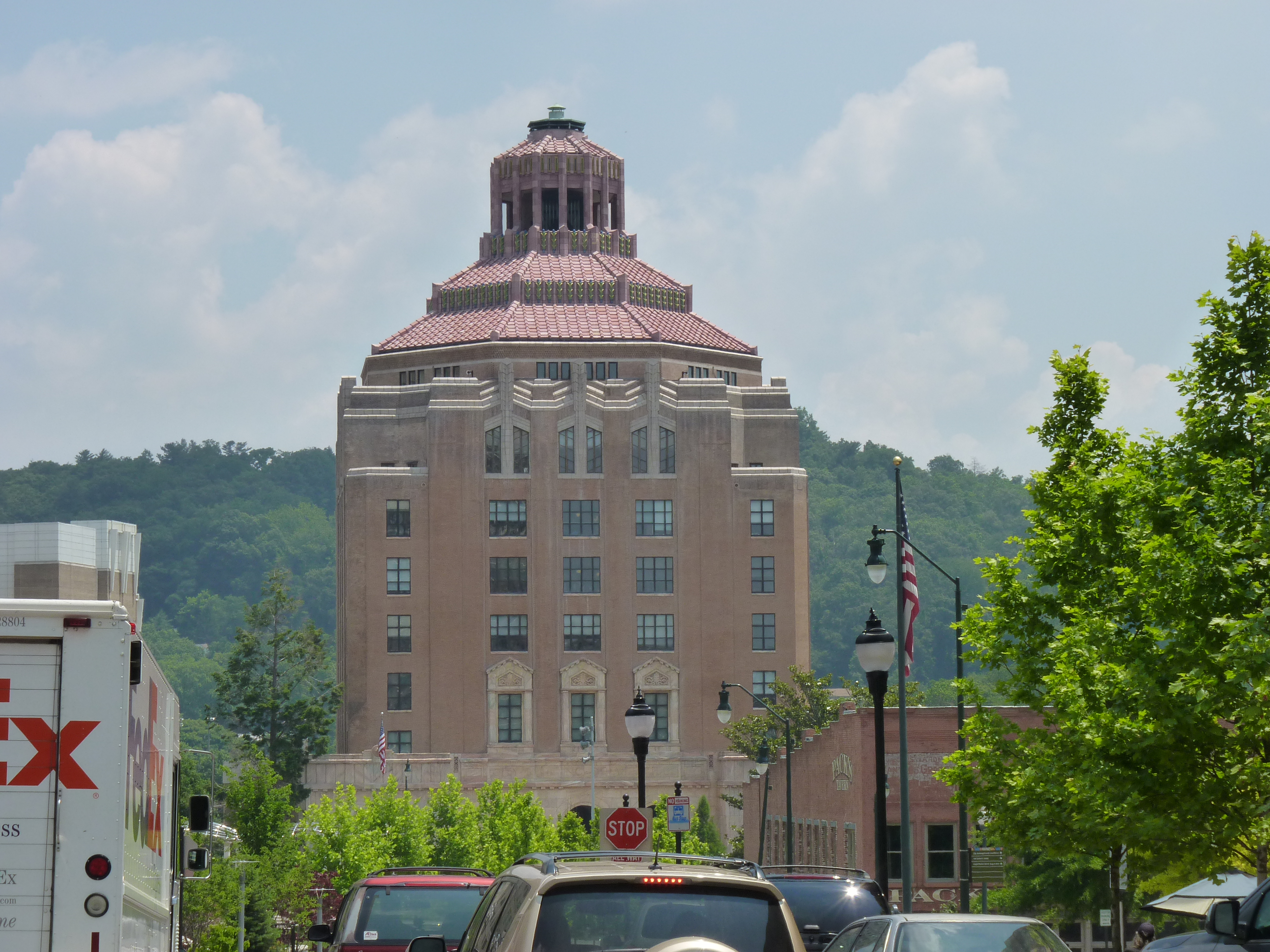
Asheville City Hall, Asheville

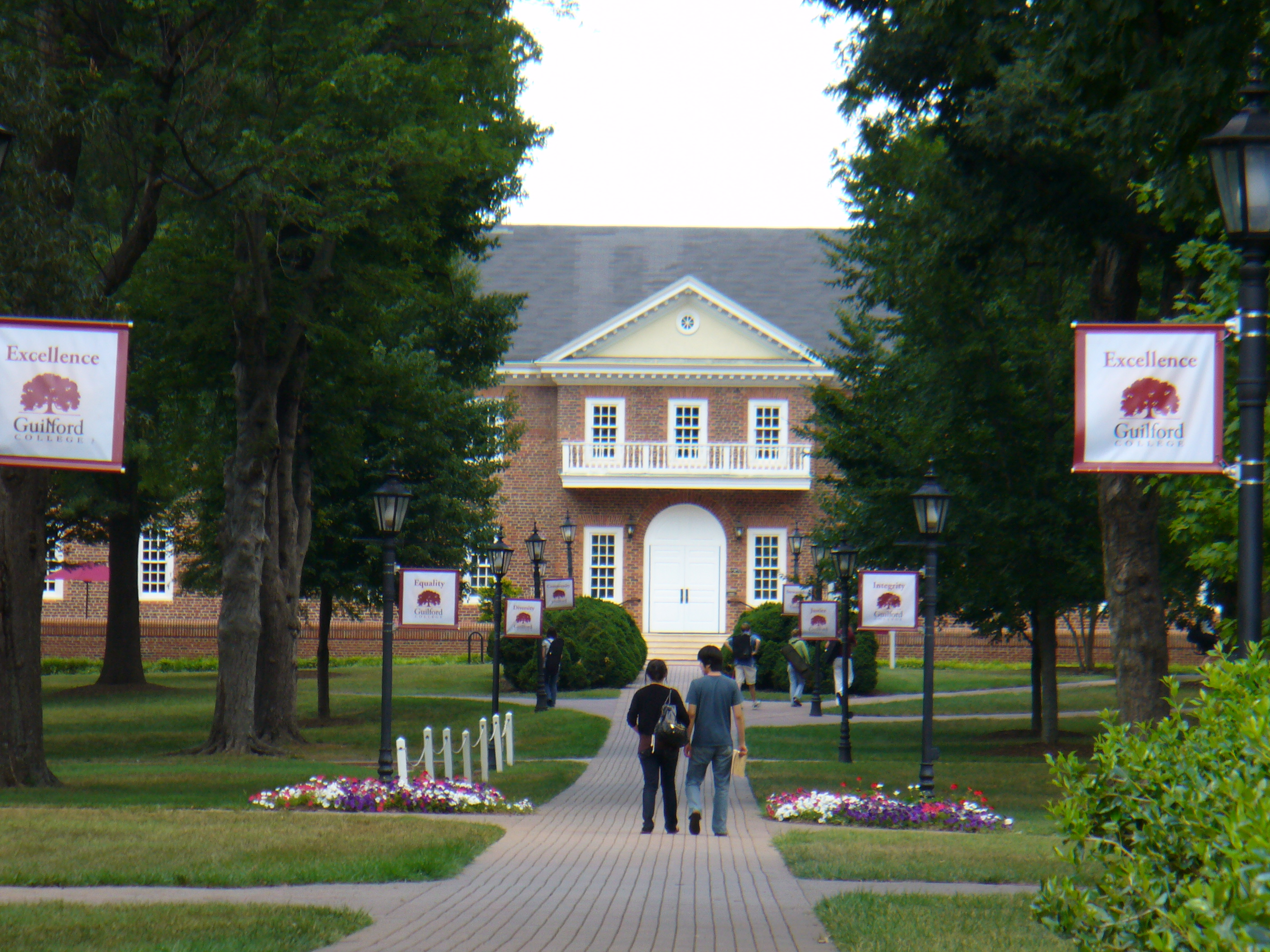
Guilford College Historic District, Greensboro

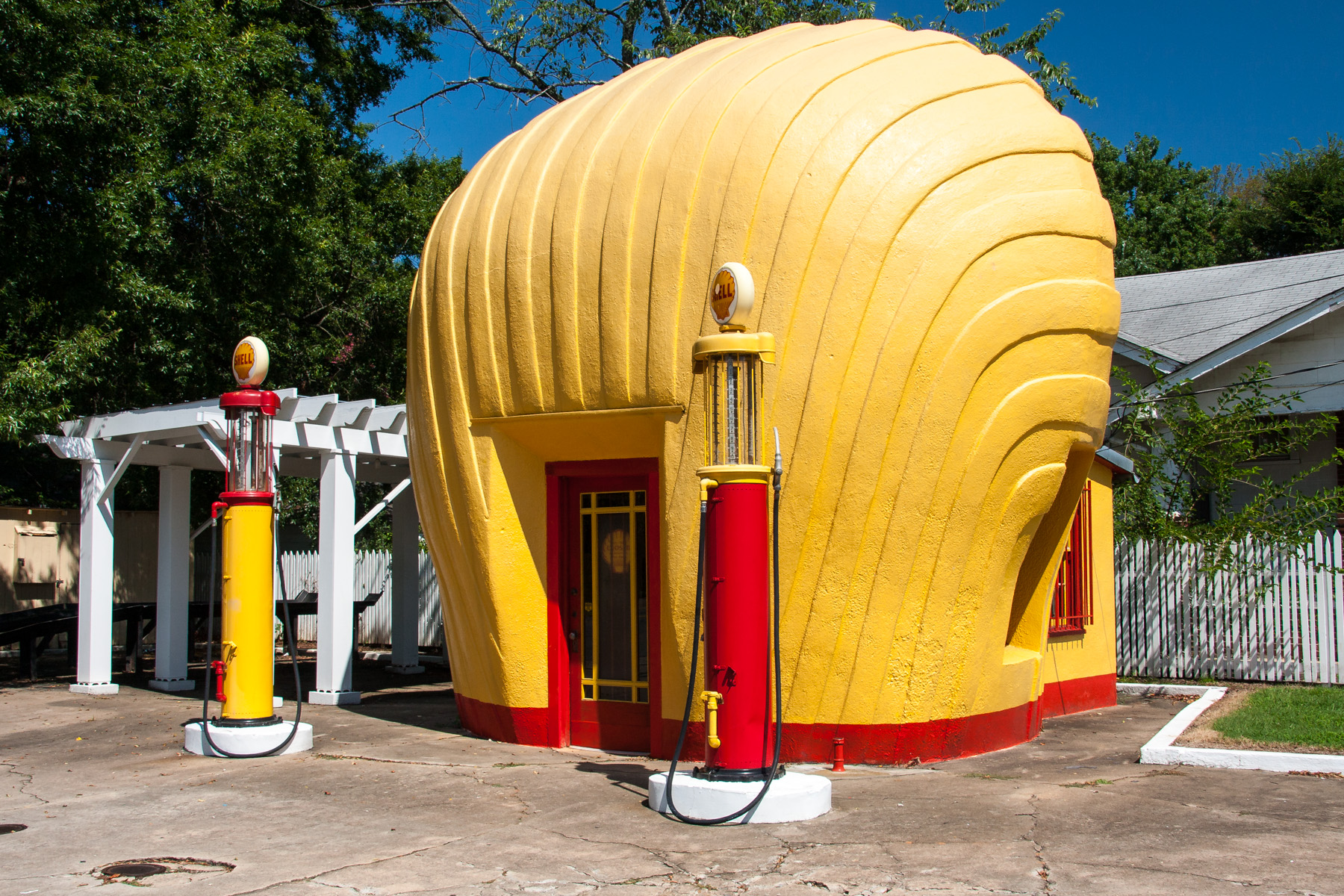
Shell Service Station, Winston-Salem

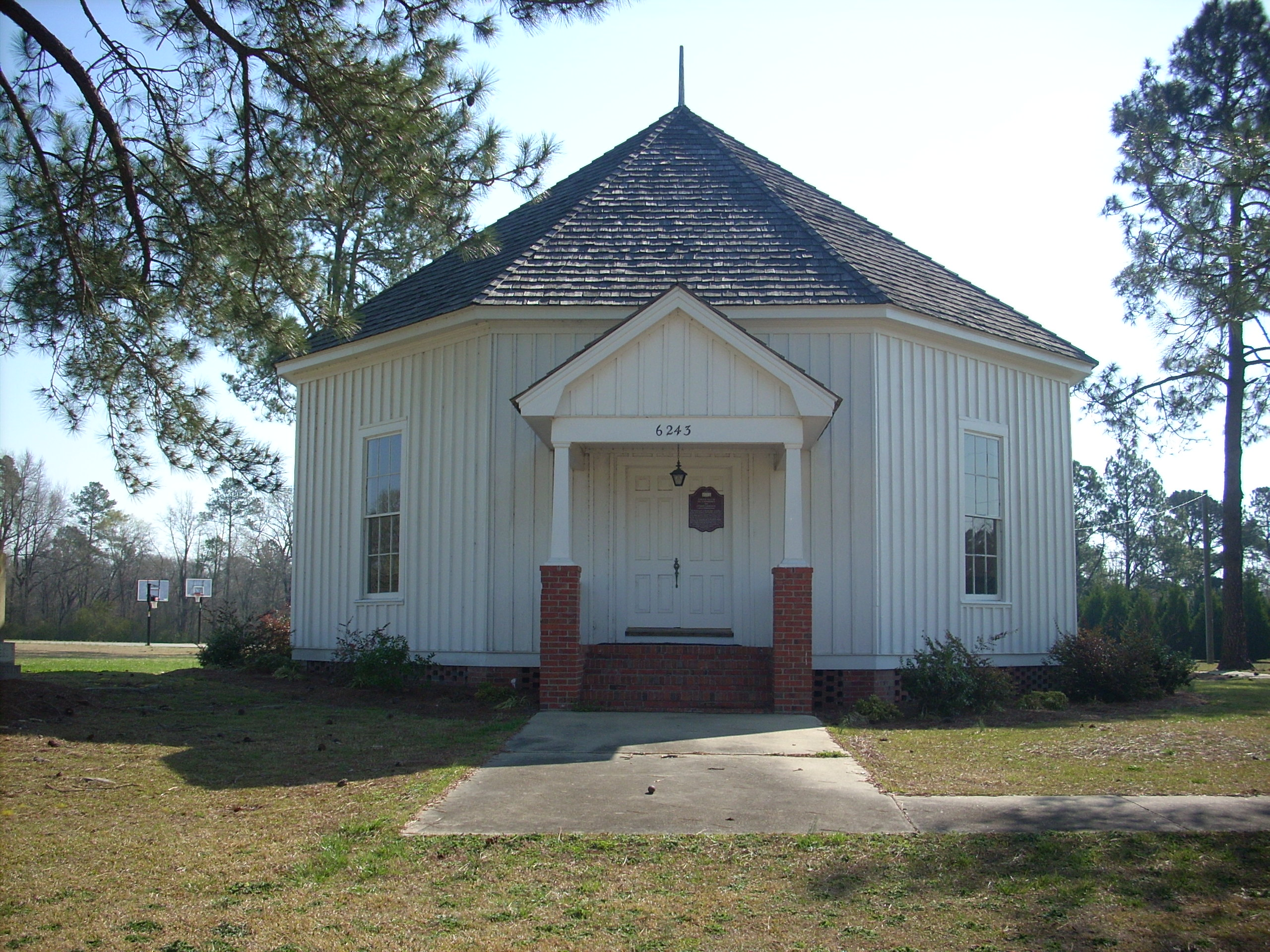
Falcon Tabernacle, Falcon

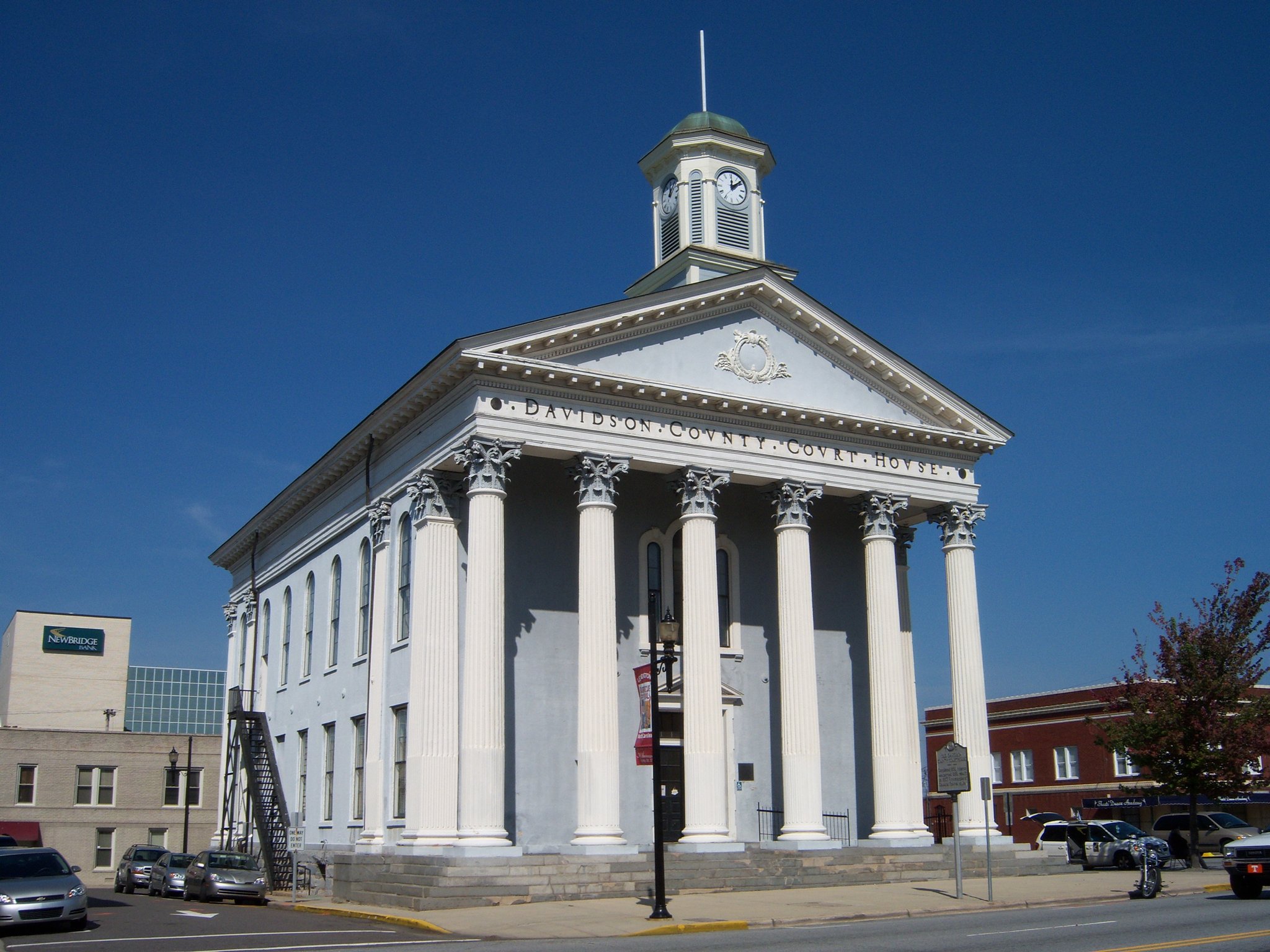
Old Davidson County Courthouse, Lexington

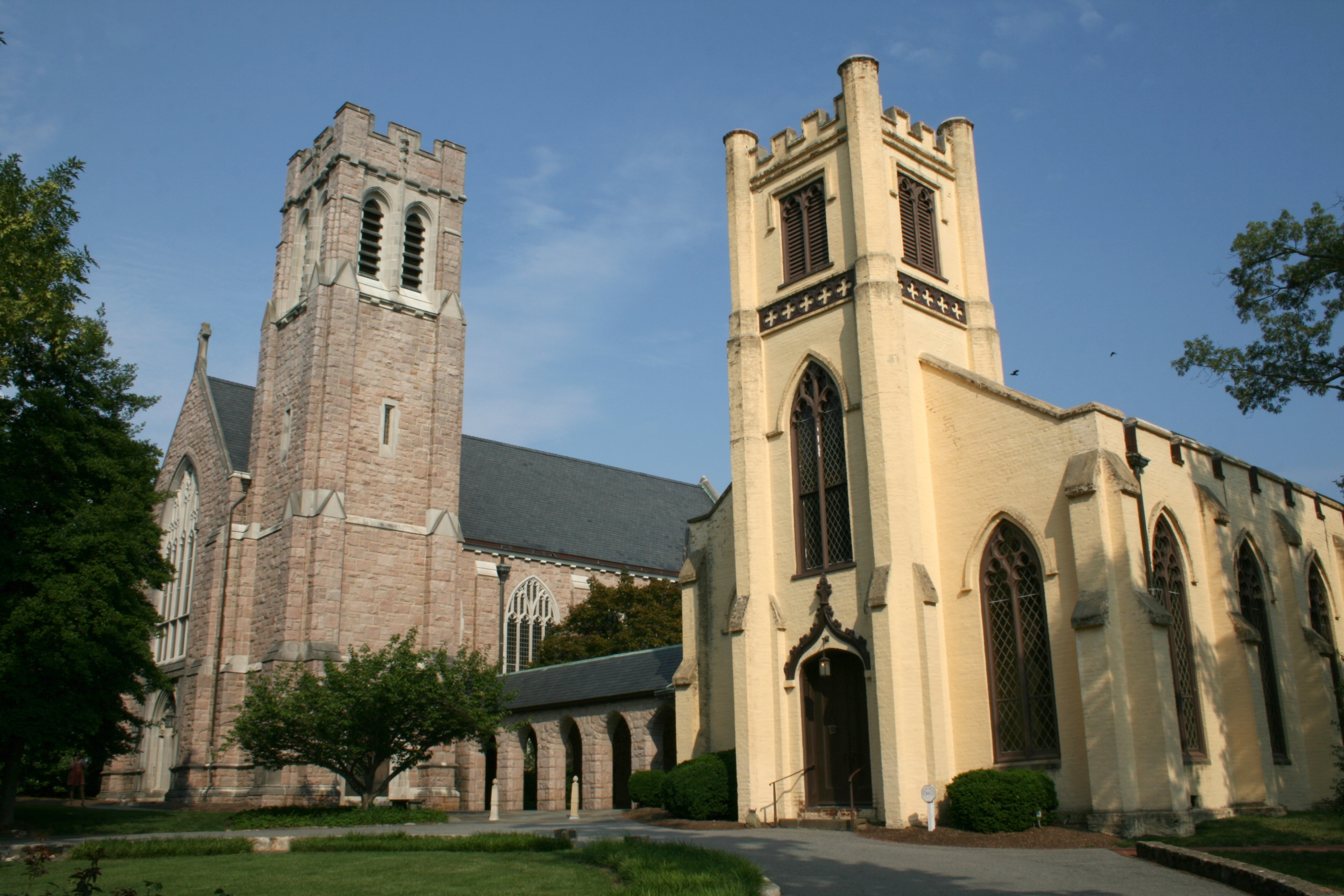
Chapel of the Cross, Chapel Hill

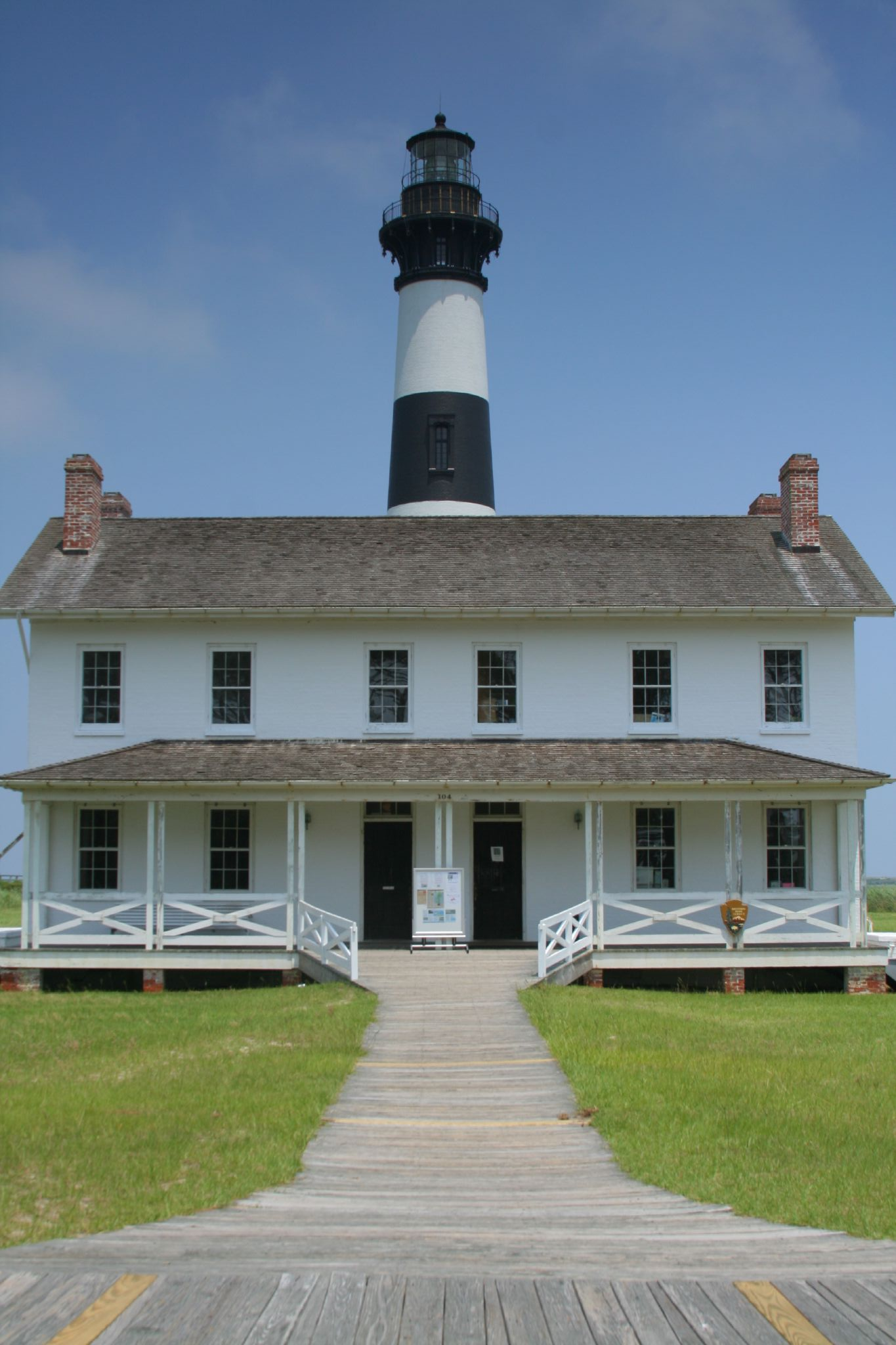
Bodie Island Light Station, Nags Head

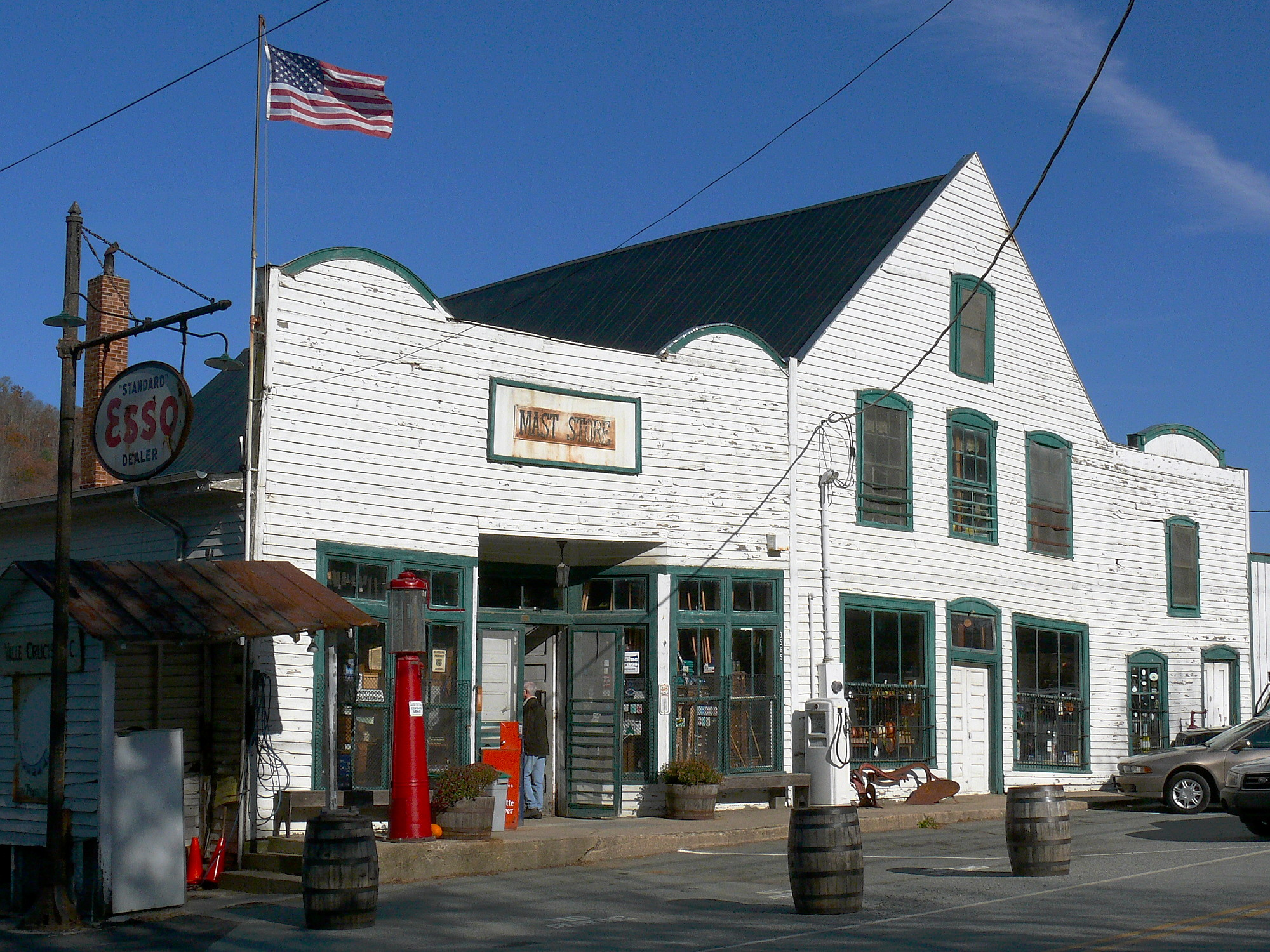
Mast General Store, Valle Crucis

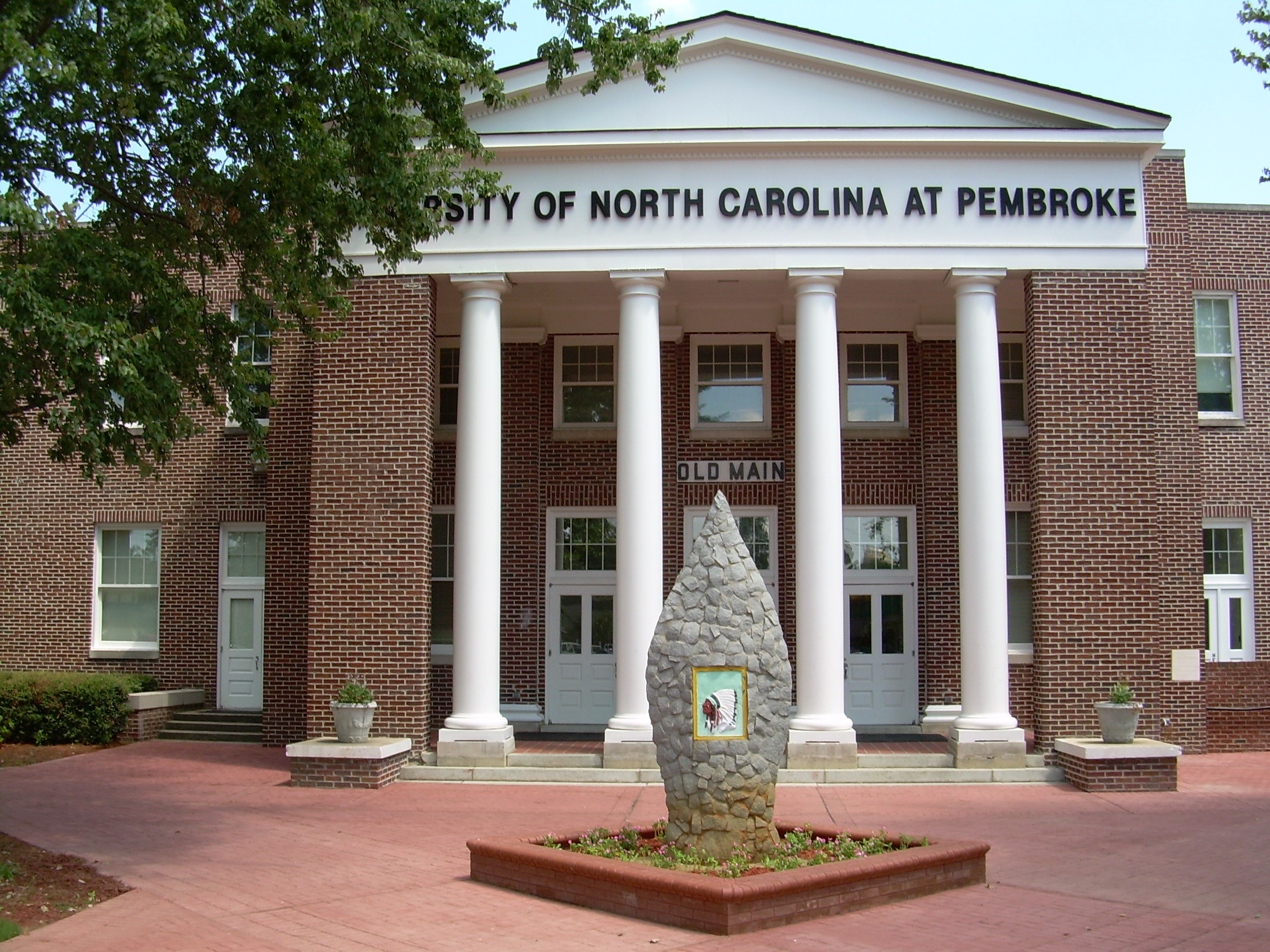
Old Main, The University of North Carolina at Pembroke, Pembroke

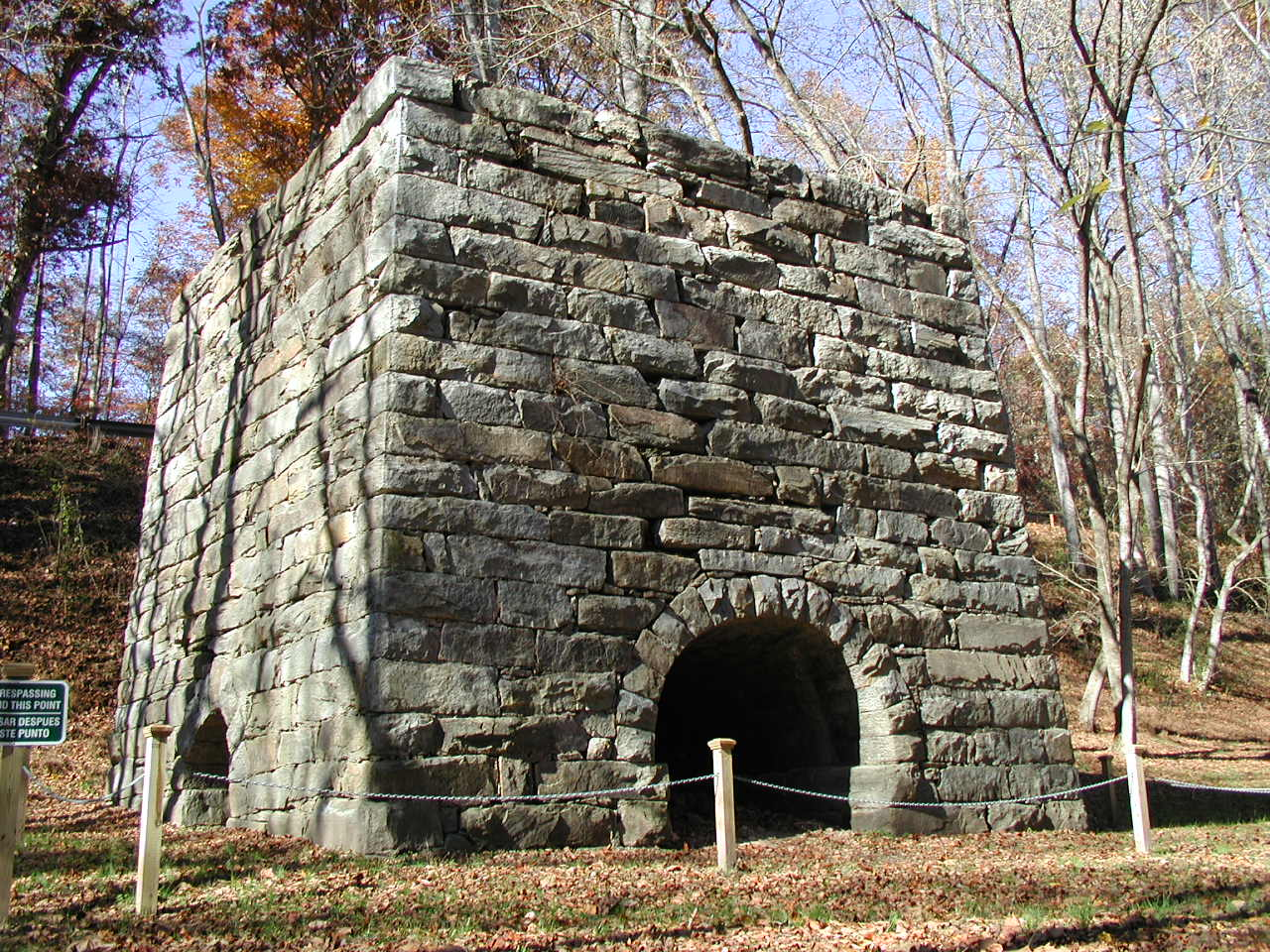
Moratock Iron Furnace, Danbury

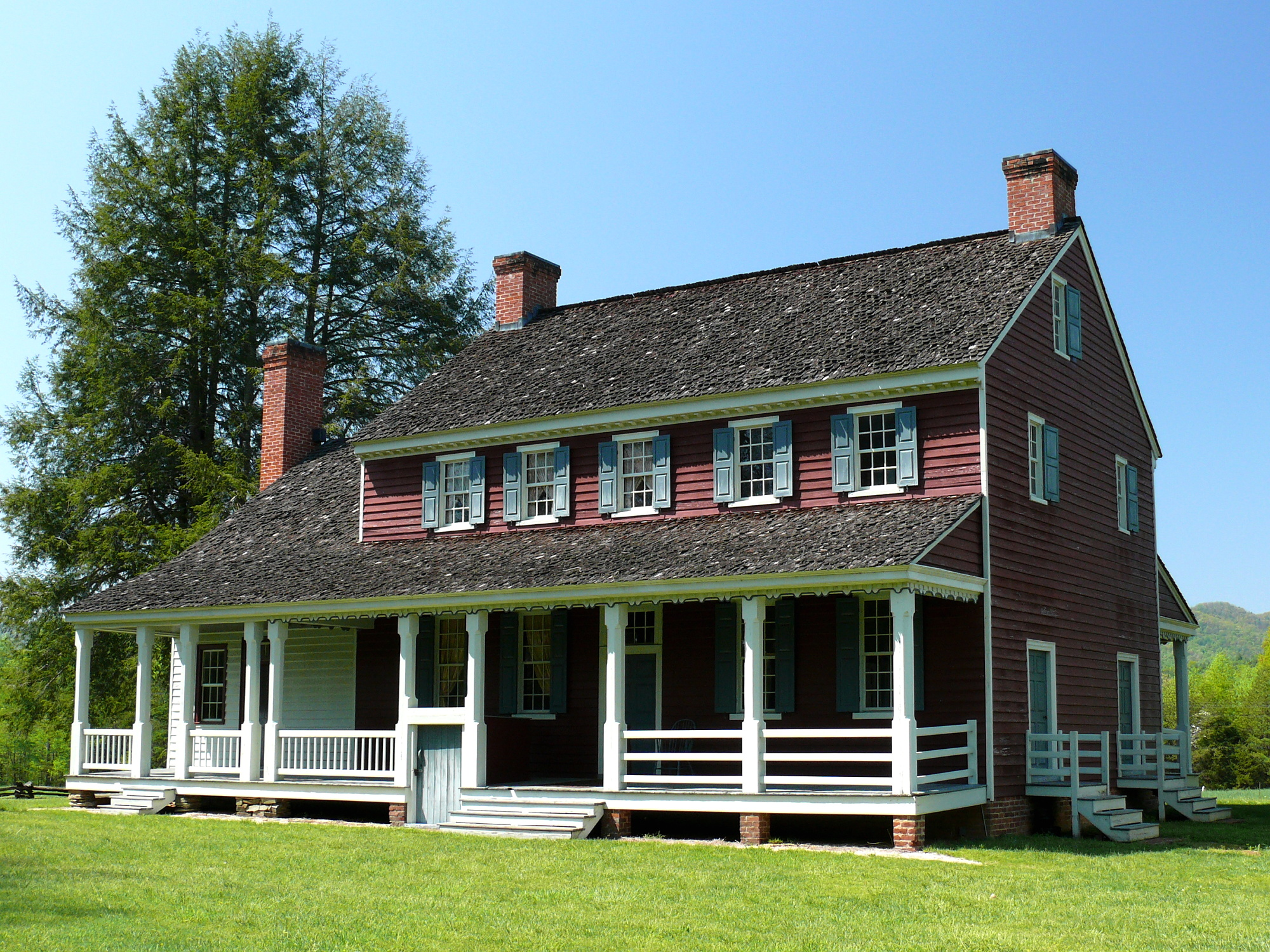
Fort Defiance, Lenoir

	County	# of Sites
1	Alamance	71
2	Alexander	3
3	Alleghany	12
4	Anson	7
5	Ashe	28
6	Avery	15
7	Beaufort	20
8	Bertie	25
9	Bladen	14
10	Brunswick	17
11	Buncombe	122
12	Burke	44
13	Cabarrus	31
14	Caldwell	20
15	Camden	9
16	Carteret	17
17	Caswell	25
18	Catawba	65
19	Chatham	57
20	Cherokee	10
21	Chowan	25
22	Clay	4
23	Cleveland	30
24	Columbus	7
25	Craven	56
26	Cumberland	71
27	Currituck	13
28	Dare	35
29	Davidson	61
30	Davie	20
31	Duplin	20
32	Durham	82
33	Edgecombe	39
34	Forsyth	115
35	Franklin	40
36	Gaston	36
37	Gates	10
38	Graham	8
39	Granville	46
40	Greene	11
41	Guilford	124
42	Halifax	44
43	Harnett	18
44	Haywood	32
45	Henderson	40
46	Hertford	35
47	Hoke	5
48	Hyde	11
49	Iredell	54
50	Jackson	22
51	Johnston	36
52	Jones	9
53	Lee	19
54	Lenoir	31
55	Lincoln	33
56	Macon	26
57	Madison	19
58	Martin	29
59	McDowell	15
60	Mecklenburg	109
61	Mitchell	10
62	Montgomery	9
63	Moore	34
64	Nash	33
65	New Hanover	27
66	Northampton	17
67	Onslow	15
68	Orange	56
69	Pamlico	2
70	Pasquotank	14
71	Pender	18
72	Perquimans	18
73	Person	13
74	Pitt	32
75	Polk	26
76	Randolph	22
77	Richmond	18
78	Robeson	23
79	Rockingham	46
80	Rowan	70
81	Rutherford	26
82	Sampson	50
83	Scotland	15
84	Stanly	17
85	Stokes	15
86	Surry	29
87	Swain	13
88	Transylvania	24
89	Tyrrell	3
90	Union	12
91	Vance	23
92	Wake	216
93	Warren	27
94	Washington	10
95	Watauga	24
96	Wayne	19
97	Wilkes	23
98	Wilson	28
99	Yadkin	8
100	Yancey	9
(duplicates)		(26)
Total:		3,120

== See also ==
- List of historical societies in North Carolina
- List of National Historic Landmarks in North Carolina
- List of bridges on the National Register of Historic Places in North Carolina
