= National Register of Historic Places listings in Tyrrell County, North Carolina =

This list includes properties and districts listed on the National Register of Historic Places in Tyrrell County, North Carolina. Click the "Map of all coordinates" link to the right to view a Google map of all properties and districts with latitude and longitude coordinates in the table below.

== Current listings ==
This National Park Service list is complete through NPS recent listings posted March 14, 2025.

	Name on the Register	Image	Date listed	Location	City or town	Description
1	Columbia Historic District	Columbia Historic District	March 17, 1994 (#94000219)	Roughly bounded by the Scuppernong River, U.S. Route 64, Road St., and Howard St. 35°55′05″N 76°15′08″W	Columbia	Columbia Historic District is a national historic district located at Columbia, North Carolina. The district developed between 1880 and 1944 and includes a variety of popular architecture styles.
2	Scuppernong River Bridge	Scuppernong River Bridge	March 5, 1992 (#92000078)	U.S. Route 64 Business across the Scuppernong River; 35°55′02″N 76°15′19″W	Columbia	Since demolished, part of western approach still extant
3	Tyrrell County Courthouse	Tyrrell County Courthouse	May 10, 1979 (#79001756)	Main and Broad Sts. 35°55′03″N 76°15′07″W	Columbia	Tyrrell County Courthouse is a historic courthouse building built in 1903 in Columbia, North Carolina. It is a two-story, Italianate style brick building with a hipped roof.

== See also ==
- National Register of Historic Places listings in North Carolina
- List of National Historic Landmarks in North Carolina
