= Hot Springs Historic District =

Hot Springs Historic District may refer to:

in the United States

(by state)

- Hot Springs Central Avenue Historic District, Hot Springs, AR, listed on the NRHP in Arkansas
- Hot Springs Railroad Warehouse Historic District, Hot Springs, AR, listed on the NRHP in Arkansas
- Hot Springs Bathhouse and Commercial Historic District in Truth or Consequences, Truth or Consequences, NM, listed on the NRHP in New Mexico
- Hot Springs Historic District (Hot Springs, North Carolina), listed on the NRHP in North Carolina
- Hot Springs Historic District (Hot Springs, South Dakota), listed on the NRHP in South Dakota
- Indian Hot Springs Health Resort Historic District, Sierra Blanca, TX, listed on the NRHP in Texas
- Mammoth Hot Springs Historic District, in Yellowstone National Park, WY, listed on the NRHP
- Hot Springs National Park
