= National Register of Historic Places listings in Columbus County, North Carolina =

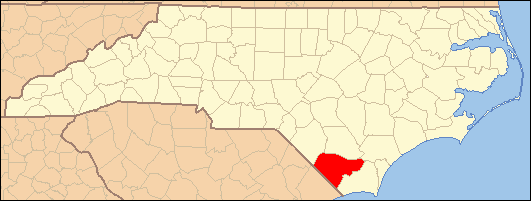

This list includes properties and districts listed on the National Register of Historic Places in Columbus County, North Carolina. Click the "Map of all coordinates" link to the right to view an online map of all properties and districts with latitude and longitude coordinates in the table below.

== Current listings ==
This National Park Service list is complete through NPS recent listings posted March 14, 2025.

	Name on the Register	Image	Date listed	Location	City or town	Description
1	Black Rock Plantation House	Black Rock Plantation House	August 18, 2014 (#14000492)	7875 Old Stage Rd. 34°23′03″N 78°17′30″W	Riegelwood	
2	Columbus County Courthouse	Columbus County Courthouse	May 10, 1979 (#79001695)	Bounded by Madison and Jefferson Sts. circle 34°20′16″N 78°42′17″W	Whiteville	
3	Dr. Neil and Nancy Elizabeth Culbreth House		January 5, 2016 (#15000955)	251 Washington St. 34°20′21″N 78°42′25″W	Whiteville	
4	Lake Waccamaw Depot	Lake Waccamaw Depot	July 21, 1983 (#83001842)	Flemington Ave. 34°19′12″N 78°31′20″W	Lake Waccamaw	
5	Powell House		January 31, 1978 (#78001940)	Main and Orange Sts. 34°18′42″N 79°02′27″W	Fair Bluff	
6	Tabor City Commercial Historic District		December 15, 2015 (#15000899)	Includes Hickman Rd., W. 5th, E. and W. 4th, and S. Main Sts. 34°08′54″N 78°52′38″W	Tabor City	
7	Westside High School		October 4, 2022 (#100008183)	801 West Smith St. 34°18′59″N 78°50′06″W	Chadbourn	

== See also ==
- National Register of Historic Places listings in North Carolina
- List of National Historic Landmarks in North Carolina
