= Tyrrell County Courthouse =

Historic courthouse in North Carolina, US

- U.S. National Register of Historic Places
- U.S. Historic district – Contributing property
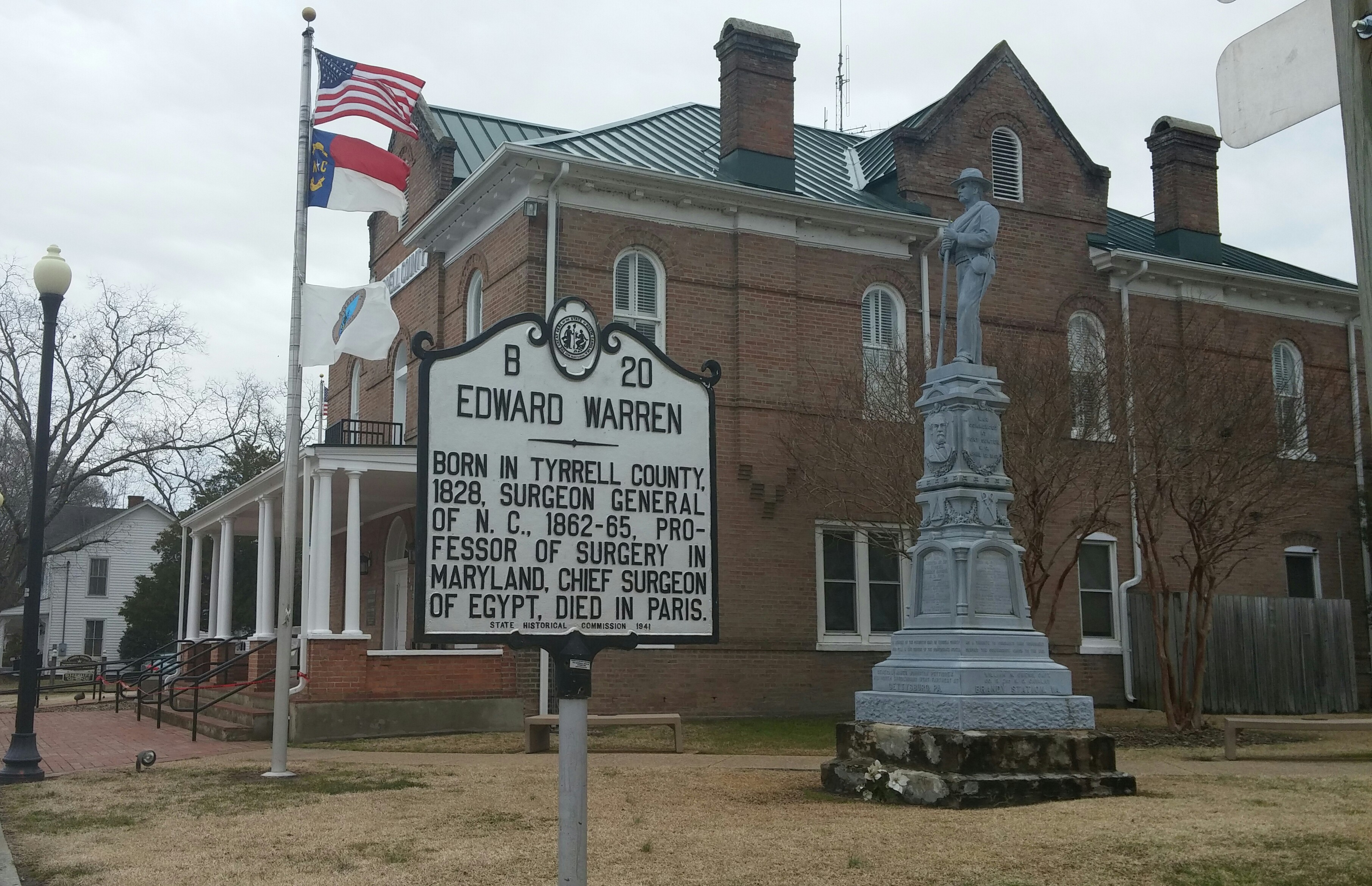
- Tyrrell County Historic Courthouse, March 2015

- Location within North Carolina Location within the United States
- Location: Main and Broad Sts., Columbia, North Carolina
- Coordinates: 35°55′3″N 76°15′9″W
- Area: less than one acre
- Built: 1903
- Built by: Smith, B.F., Construction Co.
- Architectural style: Italianate
- MPS: North Carolina County Courthouses TR
- NRHP reference No.: 79001756
- Added to NRHP: May 10, 1979

Tyrrell County Courthouse is a historic courthouse building located at Columbia, Tyrrell County, North Carolina. It was built in 1903, and is a two-story, Italianate-style brick building with a hipped roof. It has gabled, parapetted wall dormers; windows with segmental and round arches; and flat roof porch supported by paired columns dated to the 1970s.

It was listed on the National Register of Historic Places in 1979. It is located in the Columbia Historic District.
