= Capitola Manufacturing Company Cotton Yarn Mill =

Historic mill complex in North Carolina, US

- U.S. National Register of Historic Places
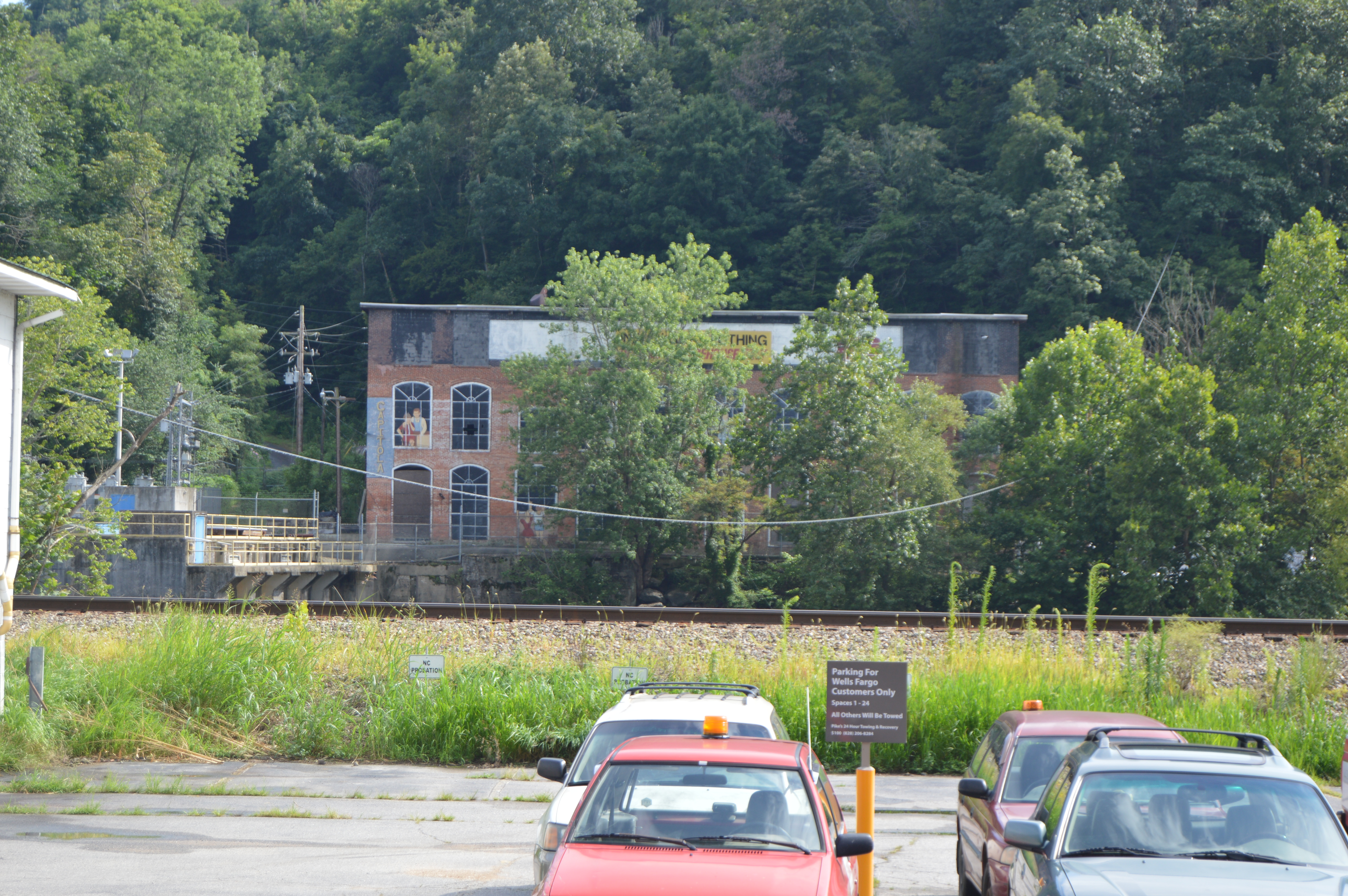
- Distant view from across the river

- Location within North Carolina Location within the United States
- Location: Southeast end of Bridge No. 328 over French Broad River, Marshall, North Carolina
- Coordinates: 35°47′42″N 82°40′59″W
- Area: 2.31 acres (0.93 ha)
- Built: c. 1905, 1928
- Built by: R.W. Wimbish
- Architect: James J. Baldwin
- Architectural style: Classical Revival
- NRHP reference No.: 12000577
- Added to NRHP: August 28, 2012

Capitola Manufacturing Company Cotton Yarn Mill, also known as the Marshall Mill and Power Company, is a historic cotton mill complex located at Marshall, Madison County, North Carolina. The main mill building is a three-story brick building built about 1905. It was raised to three stories in 1928. It measures approximately 108 feet (33 m) by 116 feet (35 m), with a low-pitched gabled roof, and windows on three sides. Also on the property is a contributing boiler house (c. 1905) and water tank (c. 1905).

It was listed on the National Register of Historic Places in 2012.
