= Marshall Main Street Historic District =

Historic district in North Carolina, United States

- U.S. National Register of Historic Places
- U.S. Historic district
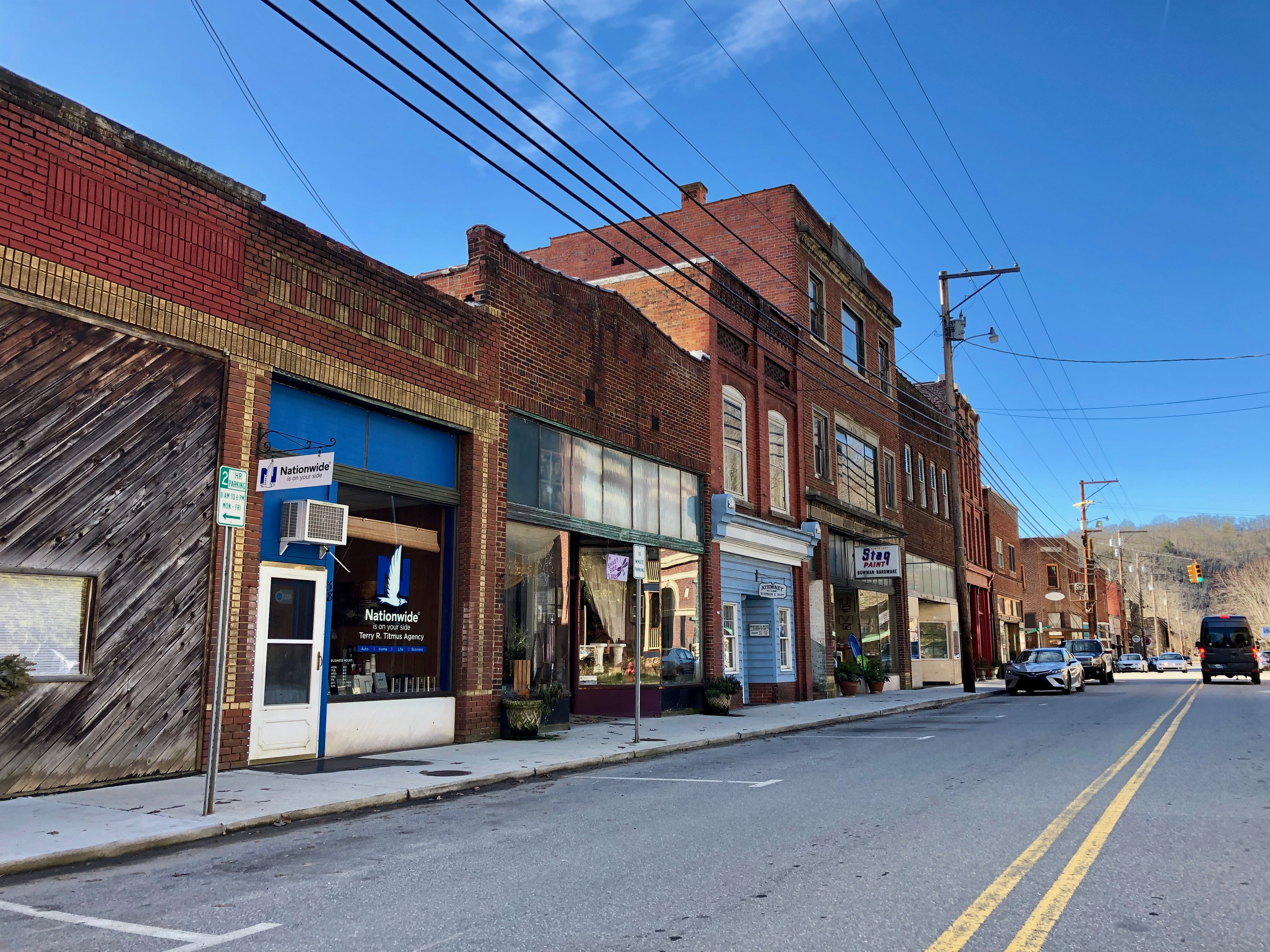
- Main Street, Marshall, January 2019

- Location within North Carolina Location within the United States
- Location: 101 N. Main St.- 165 S. Main St., Bridge St. and 33 Bailey's Branch Rd., Marshall, North Carolina
- Coordinates: 35°47′50″N 82°40′59″W
- Area: 13 acres (5.3 ha)
- Architect: Smith & Carrier; Baldwin, James J.
- Architectural style: Early Commercial, Classical Revival
- NRHP reference No.: 07000819
- Added to NRHP: August 16, 2007

Marshall Main Street Historic District is a national historic district located at Marshall, Madison County, North Carolina. It encompasses 40 contributing buildings in the central business district of Marshall. It includes notable examples of Classical Revival architecture and buildings dating the mid-19th century through 1950. Located in the district are the separately listed Bank of French Broad designed by James J. Baldwin and Madison County Courthouse designed by Smith & Carrier. Other notable buildings include the Rock Café Restaurant (1947), Colonel Lawrence M. Allen House (1849; 1875; 1925), M. E. Church South (1912), O.C. Rector Building (1928), and Tweed's Department Store (c. 1925).

It was listed on the National Register of Historic Places in 2007.
