= Bank of French Broad =

Historic building in North Carolina, US

- U.S. National Register of Historic Places
- U.S. Historic district – Contributing property
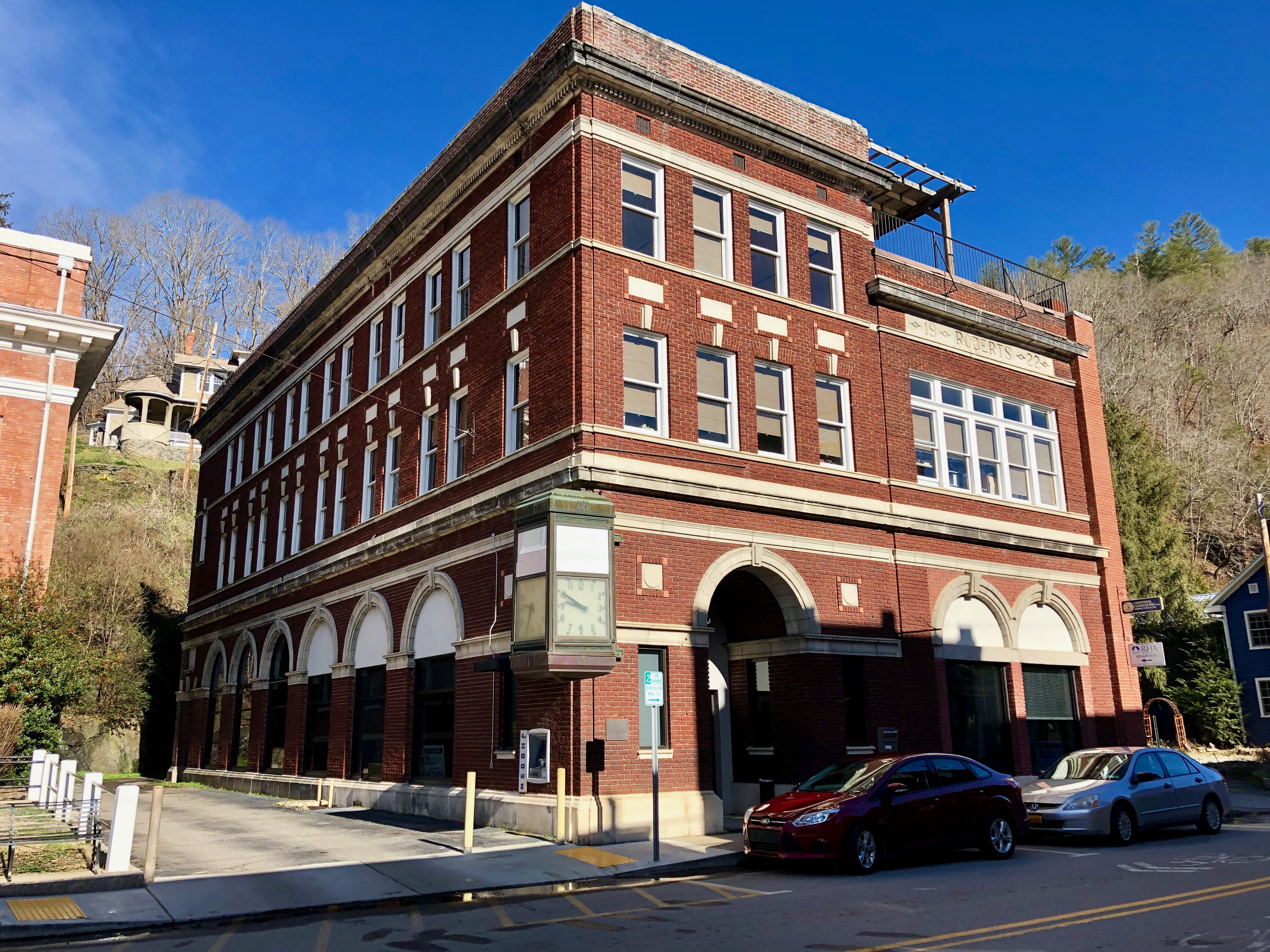
- Bank of French Broad Building, January 2019

- Location within North Carolina Location within the United States
- Location: 13 S Main St., Marshall, North Carolina
- Coordinates: 35°47′51″N 82°41′2″W
- Area: 0.3 acres (0.12 ha)
- Built: 1922-1923
- Built by: R.W. Wimbish
- Architect: James J. Baldwin
- Architectural style: Classical Revival
- NRHP reference No.: 04000584
- Added to NRHP: June 10, 2004

Bank of French Broad, also known as the Robert Building, is a historic bank building located at Marshall, Madison County, North Carolina. The Bank of French Broad and adjacent Robert Building were designed by noted Asheville architect James J. Baldwin and built in 1922–1923. They are two- to three-story, Classical Revival-style brick buildings. The two buildings were joined into one building in the late 1970s to early 1980s.

It was listed on the National Register of Historic Places in 2004. It is located in the Marshall Main Street Historic District.
