= Mars Hill Anderson Rosenwald School =

Historic school building in North Carolina, United States

- U.S. National Register of Historic Places
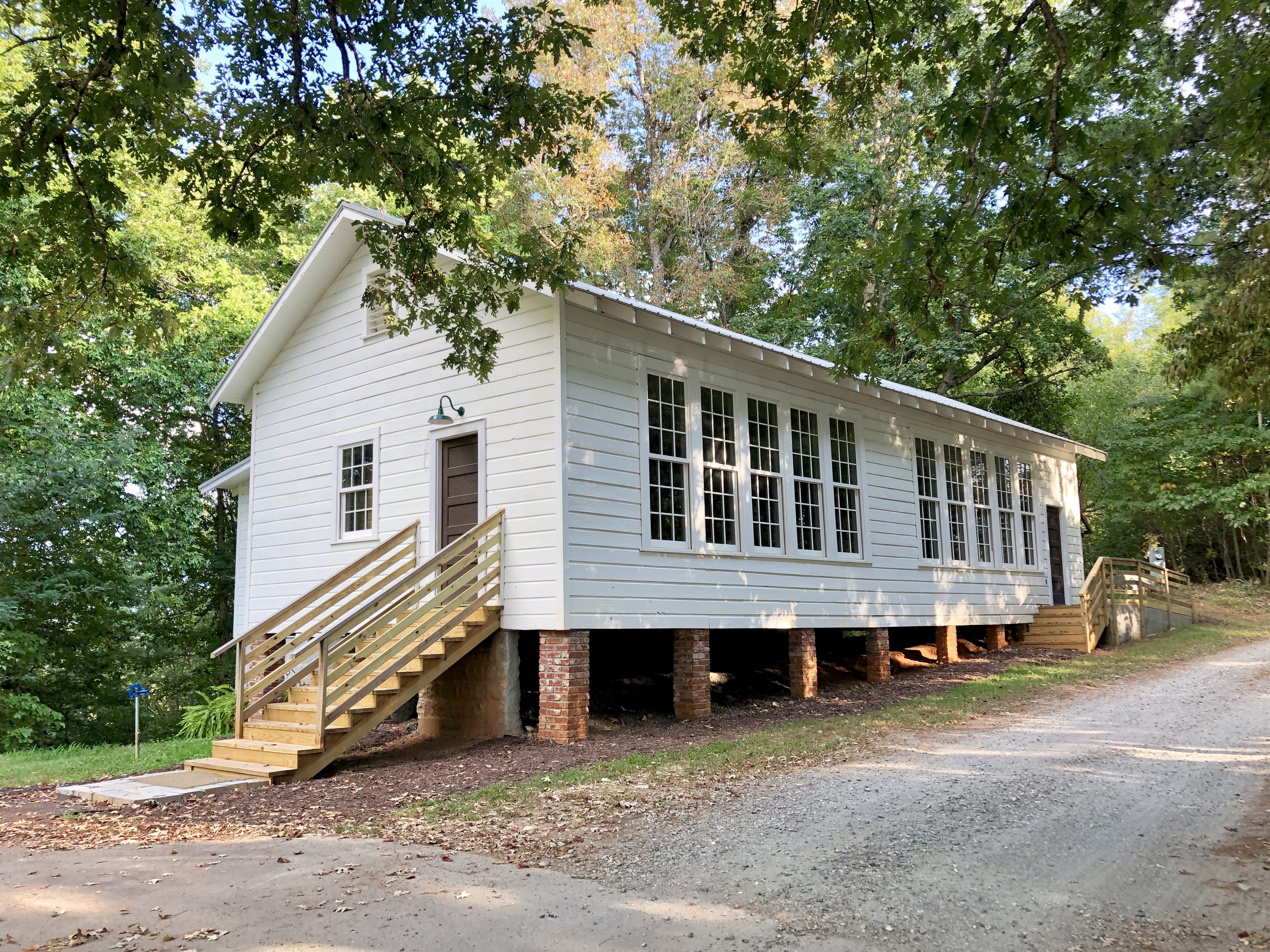
- Mars Hill Anderson Rosenwald School, 12 September 2019

- Location within North Carolina Location within the United States
- Location: 225 Mount Olive Dr., Mars Hill, North Carolina
- Coordinates: 35°48′23″N 82°32′29″W
- Area: less than one acre
- Built: 1928
- NRHP reference No.: 100002519
- Added to NRHP: May 31, 2018

Mars Hill Anderson Rosenwald School (also known as Anderson School) is a historic school building in Mars Hill, North Carolina.

== History ==
In 1928, the school was built to educate Mars Hill's African-American children.

It served Madison County and portions of Yancey County from 1928 to 1965, when it closed as a result of North Carolina's school integration. It is one of only two surviving Rosenwald schools in the state's westernmost region, and was restored between 2009 and 2019.

In 2018, it was inscribed on the National Register of Historic Places.
