= James H. White House =

Historic house in North Carolina, United States

- U.S. National Register of Historic Places
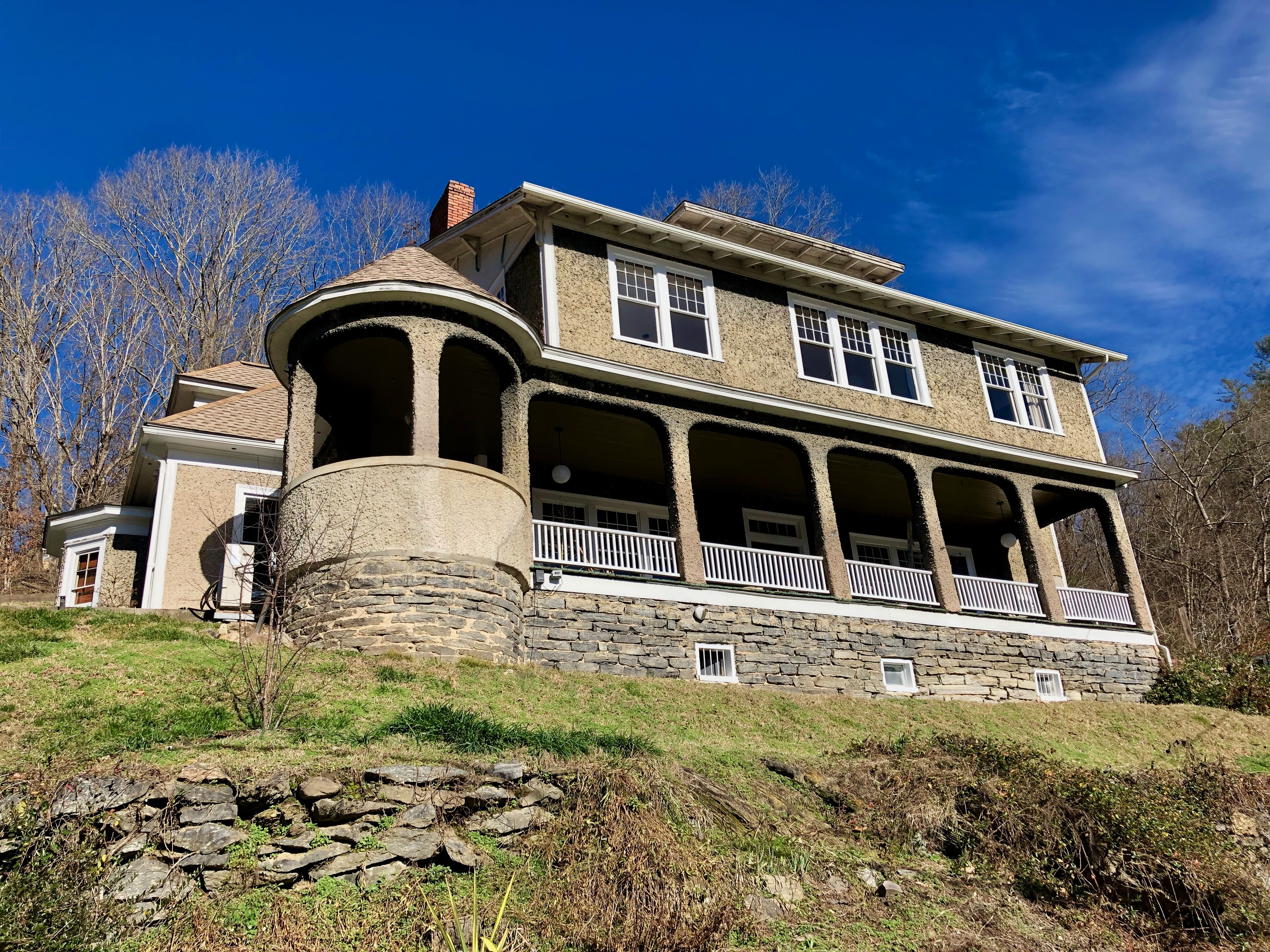
- James H. White House, January 2019

- Location within North Carolina Location within the United States
- Location: 5 Hill St., Marshall, North Carolina
- Coordinates: 35°47′53″N 82°41′00″W
- Area: 1.4 acres (0.57 ha)
- Built: 1903
- Architect: Smith, Richard Sharp
- Architectural style: Vernacular Old English
- NRHP reference No.: 89002136
- Added to NRHP: December 21, 1989

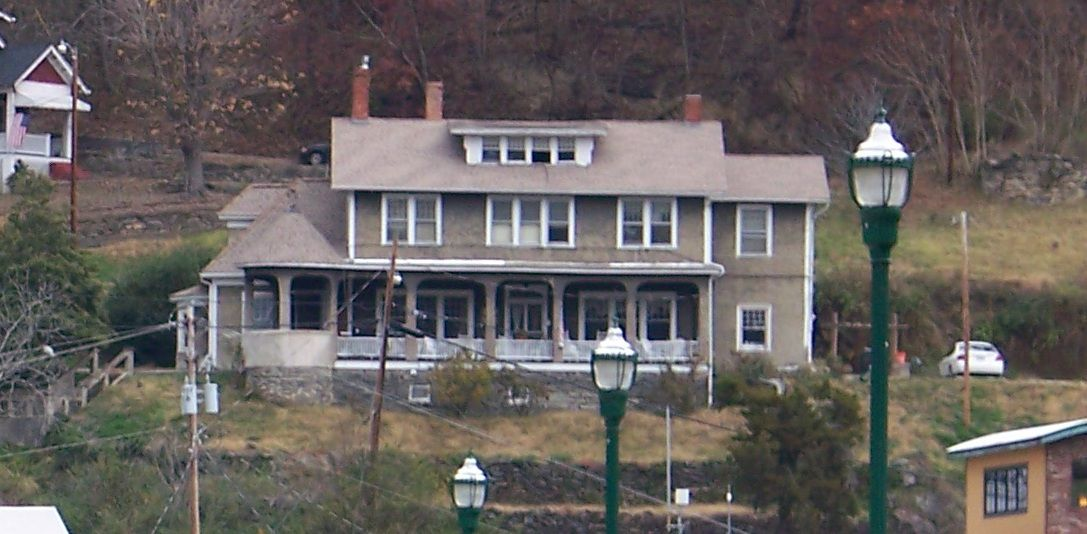
From across the French Broad River, 2011

James H. White House, also known as Marshall House, is a historic home located at Marshall, Madison County, North Carolina. It was designed by noted Asheville architect Richard Sharp Smith and built in 1903. It is a two-story-and-attic frame dwelling sheathed in a thick stucco known as "pebbledash." The front facade features a one-story recessed wraparound porch with an attached conical-roofed gazebo. The house was remodeled between 1925 and 1930.

It was listed on the National Register of Historic Places in 1989.
