= Marshall High School (Marshall, North Carolina) =

Historic school building in North Carolina, United States

- U.S. National Register of Historic Places
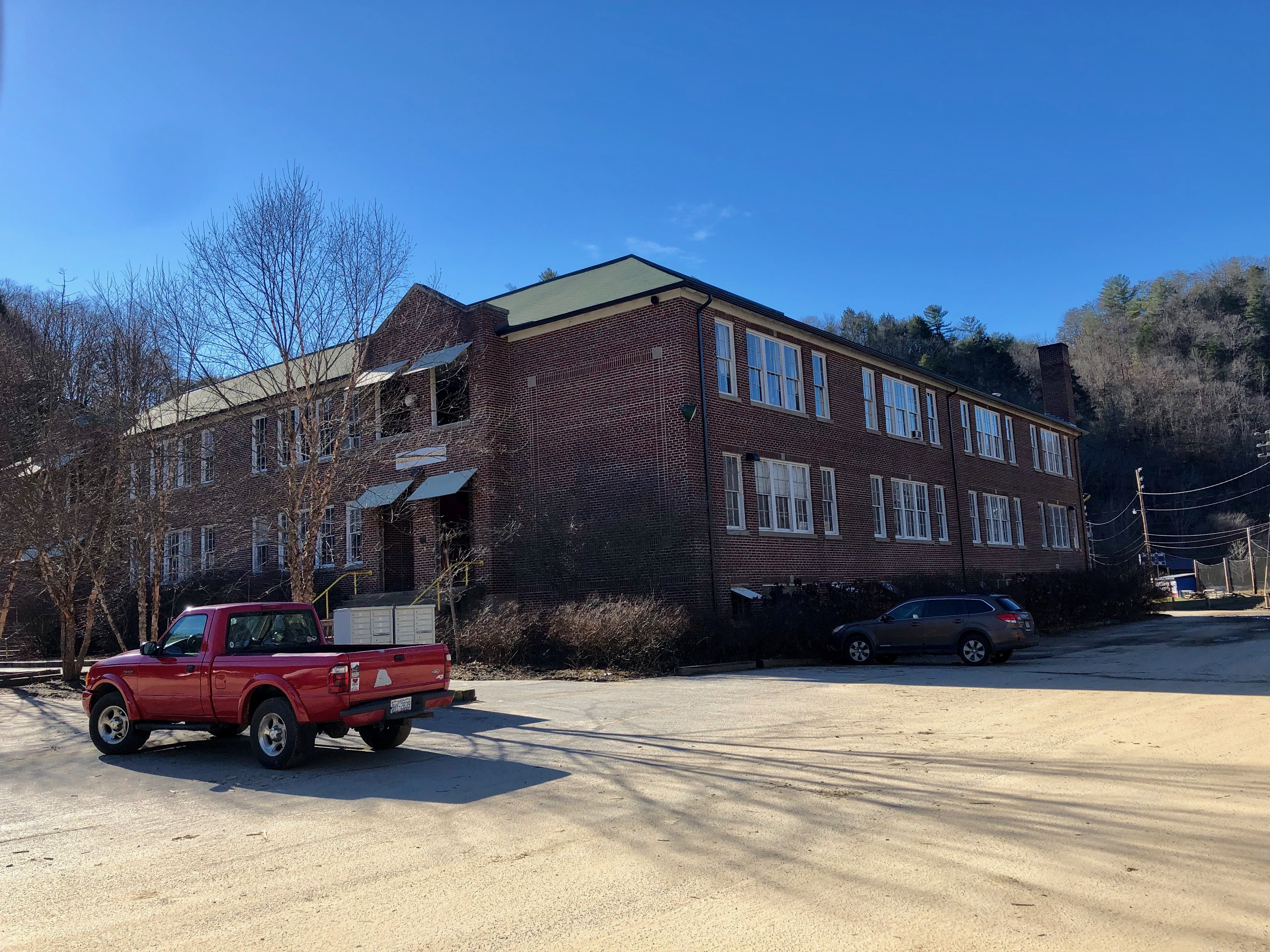
- Marshall High Studios, January 2019

- Location within North Carolina Location within the United States
- Location: Western side of Bridge Street on Blannahassett Island in Marshall, North Carolina
- Coordinates: 35°47′44″N 82°41′13″W
- Area: 2.3 acres (0.93 ha)
- Built: 1926
- Built by: Mack Sprinkle
- Architect: Frank B. Simpson
- Architectural style: Colonial Revival
- NRHP reference No.: 08000779 (original); 100011319 (increase)

Significant dates
- Added to NRHP: August 13, 2008
- Boundary increase: January 14, 2025

Marshall High School is a historic high school building located at Marshall, Madison County, North Carolina. It was designed by noted Raleigh architect Frank B. Simpson and built in 1926. It is two-story-plus-basement, U-shaped brick building with a low hip roof in the Colonial Revival style. Marshall High School continued to serve the community until a new high school was built in 1973. The building was damaged in a flood in 2004, and was subsequently renovated starting in February 2007.

It was listed on the National Register of Historic Places in 2008.
