= Columbia Historic District (Columbia, North Carolina) =

Historic district in North Carolina, United States

- U.S. National Register of Historic Places
- U.S. Historic district
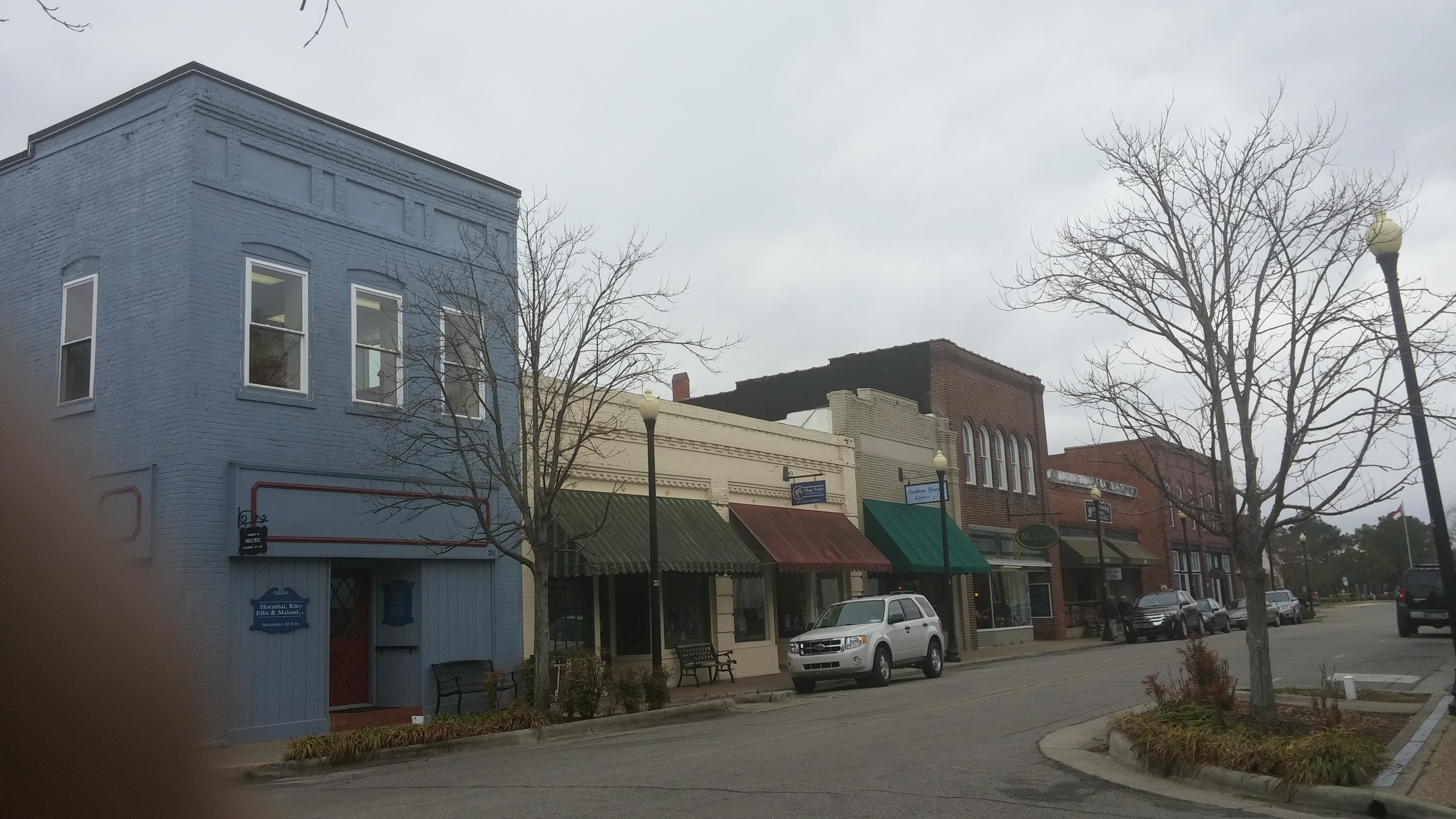
- Columbia Historic District, Main Street, March 2015

- Location within North Carolina Location within the United States
- Location: Roughly bounded by the Scuppernong R., US 64, Road St. and Howard St., Columbia, North Carolina
- Coordinates: 35°55′5″N 76°15′8″W
- Area: 35 acres (14 ha)
- Built: 1903
- Architect: Multiple
- Architectural style: Multiple
- NRHP reference No.: 94000219
- Added to NRHP: March 17, 1994

Columbia Historic District is a national historic district located at Columbia, Tyrrell County, North Carolina. It encompasses 119 contributing buildings, 1 contributing structure, and 1 contributing object in the central business district and surrounding residential sections of Columbia. The district developed between about 1880 and 1944 and includes examples of a variety of popular architecture styles. Located in the district is the separately listed Tyrrell County Courthouse. Other notable buildings include Snell's Inn (c. 1910), Columbia Garage (c. 1930), Columbia Christian Church (c. 1905), McClees-Coffield House (c. 1880), Combs-Hussey House (c. 1900), Frederick L. W. Cohoon House (c. 1904), Columbia Baptist Church (1905), W. J. White Building (1931-1932), Columbian Theatre (c. 1935), Wesley United Methodist Church (1912), St. Andrews Episcopal Church (1909), Tyrrell County Jail (c. 1910), Merchants and Farmers Bank / East Carolina Bank (c. 1905), Tyrrell County Bank (c. 1930), and Columbia Theatre (c. 1900).

It was listed on the National Register of Historic Places in 1994.
