= Jeff White House =

Historic house in North Carolina, United States

- U.S. National Register of Historic Places
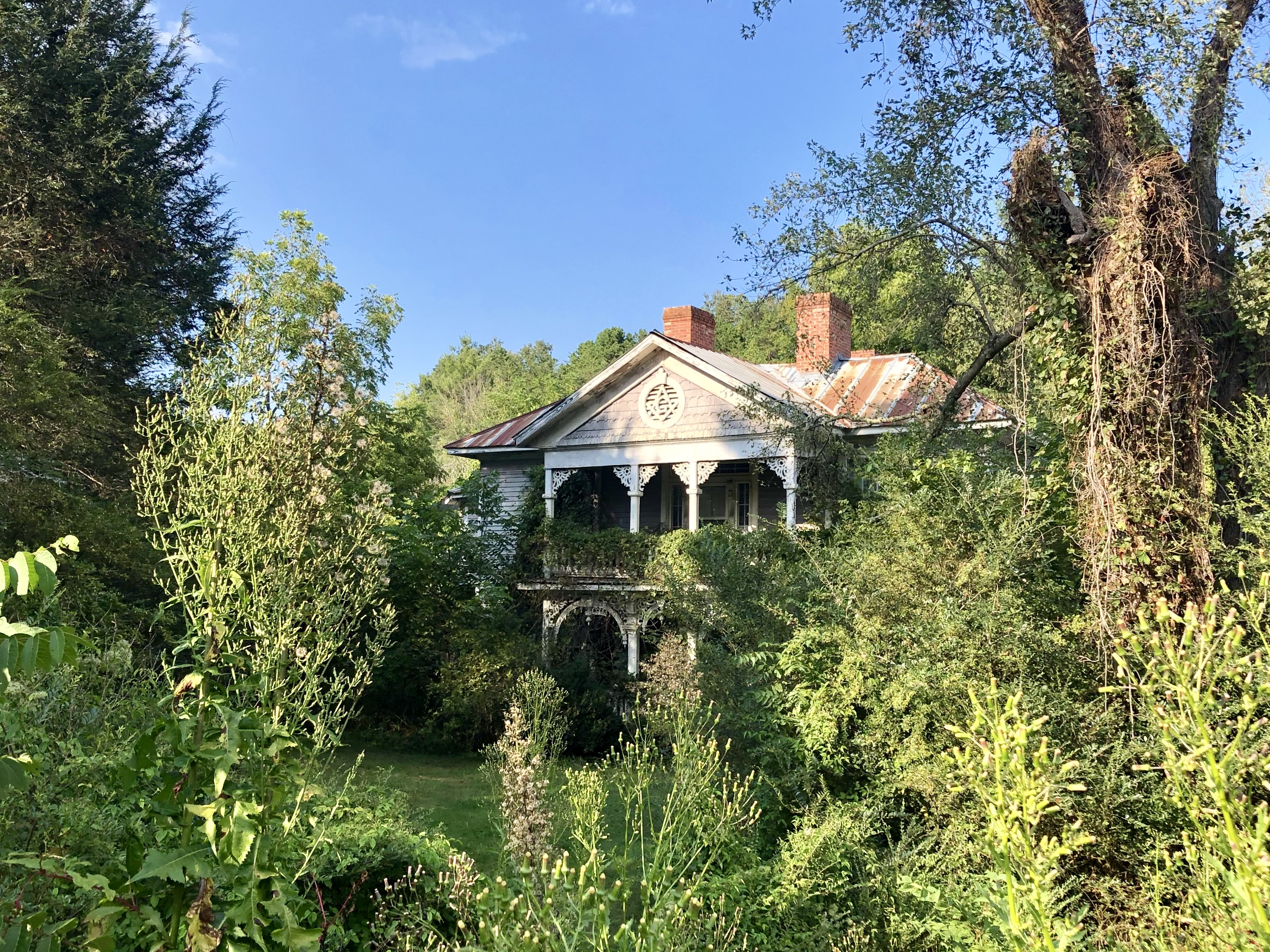
- Principal Facade, Jeff White House

- Location within North Carolina Location within the United States
- Location: Northeast of Marshall on NC 213, near Marshall, North Carolina
- Coordinates: 35°49′9″N 82°38′48″W
- Area: 5 acres (2.0 ha)
- Architectural style: frame farmhouse
- NRHP reference No.: 75001279
- Added to NRHP: June 5, 1975

Jeff White House is a historic home located near Marshall, Madison County, North Carolina. It is dated to the late-19th century, and is a two-story, three-bay, T-shaped frame farmhouse. It features a two-story gable-roof front porch, with notable applied wooden ornament and rich, lacelike ornamentation.

It was listed on the National Register of Historic Places in 1975.
