= Marshall, North Carolina =

- Town
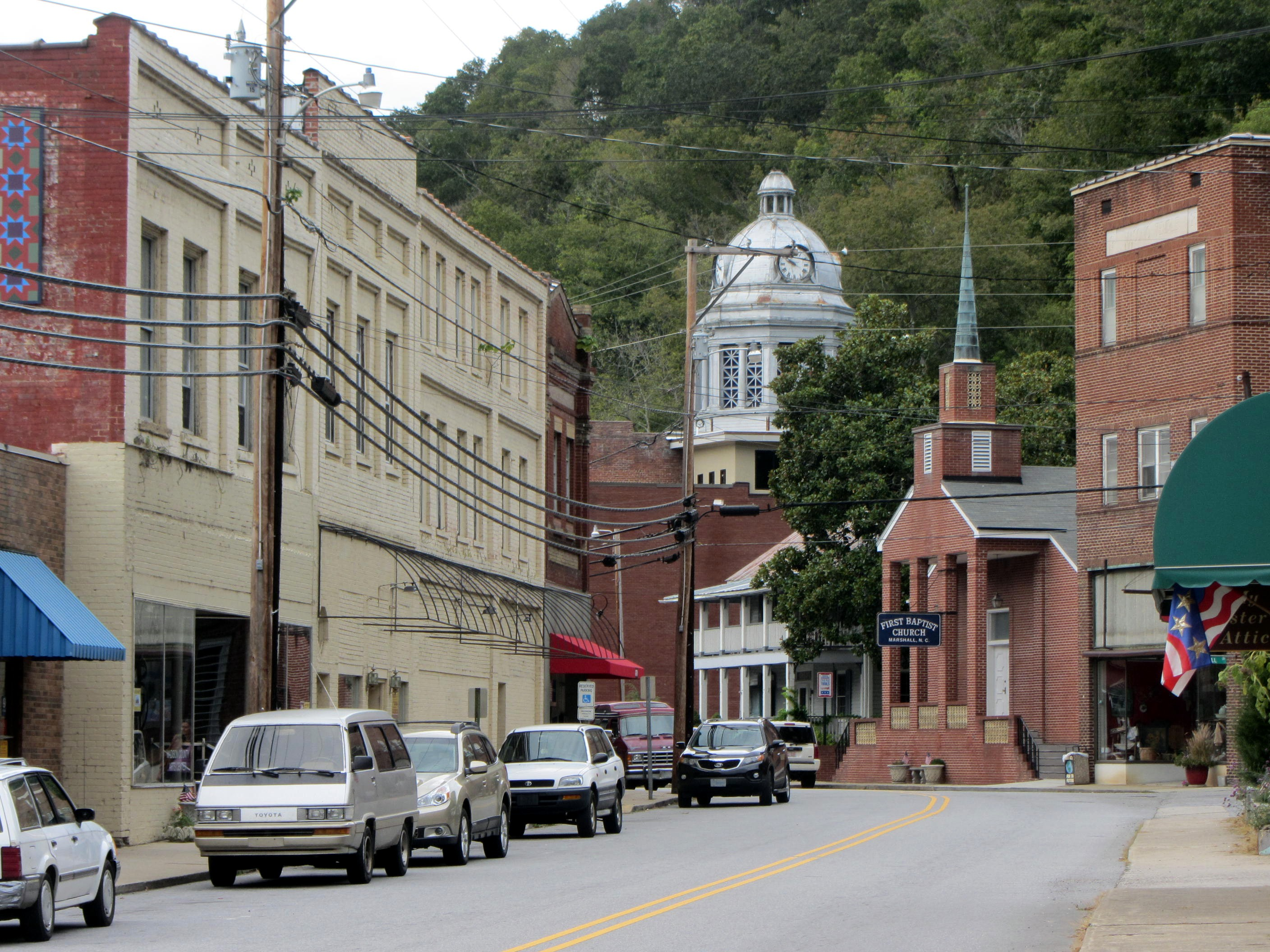
- Main Street

- Seal

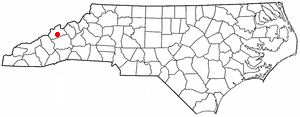
- Location in North Carolina
- Coordinates: 35°47′50″N 82°40′54″W
- Country: United States
- State: North Carolina
- County: Madison

Area
  - Total: 4.20 sq mi (10.88 km^{2})
  - Land: 3.98 sq mi (10.32 km^{2})
  - Water: 0.22 sq mi (0.57 km^{2})
- Elevation: 1,742 ft (531 m)

Population (2020)
  - Total: 777
  - Density: 195.1/sq mi (75.32/km^{2})
- Time zone: UTC-5 (Eastern (EST))
  - Summer (DST): UTC-4 (EDT)
- ZIP Code: 28753
- Area code: 828
- FIPS code: 37-41580
- GNIS feature ID: 2406103
- Website: townofmarshall.org

Marshall is a town in Madison County, North Carolina, United States. The population was 777 at the 2020 census, down from 872 in 2010. It is the county seat of Madison County.

== History ==
During the Civil War, Marshall, as the seat of Confederate administration for Madison County, was the scene of conflict with the largely pro-Union rural population. On May 13, 1861, the election day for delegates to the state convention on secession from the Union, a man shot and killed the pro-secession county sheriff after a dispute in which the sheriff had shot the man's son.

Later, Confederate authorities restricted the distribution of salt, which was needed to preserve meat in the winter. In January 1863, a group of men raided the salt warehouse in Marshall, then proceeded to ransack the home of Colonel Lawrence Allen of the 64th North Carolina Regiment (the columned house below the courthouse dome in the Main Street photo).

In retaliation, the 64th North Carolina Regiment summarily executed 13 men and boys in the Shelton Laurel massacre.

From the 1950s to the 1980s, Marshall was the seat of the Ponder machine, which controlled all the patronage jobs in Madison County.

The Bank of French Broad, Capitola Manufacturing Company Cotton Yarn Mill, Madison County Courthouse, Marshall High School, Marshall Main Street Historic District, James H. White House, and Jeff White House are listed on the National Register of Historic Places.

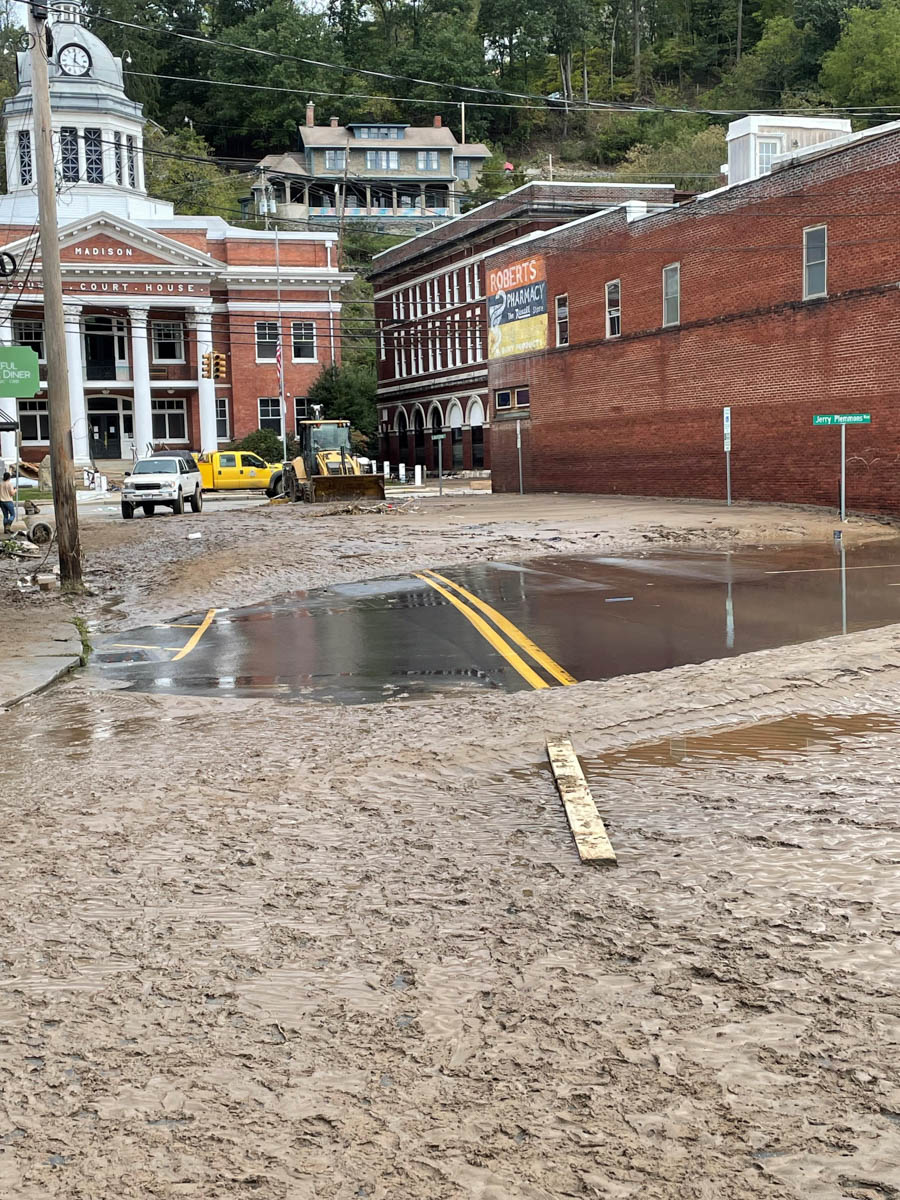
View towards the Courthouse after the Hurricane Helene flooding in 2024

The town was impacted by Hurricane Helene in 2024. The hurricane destroyed several buildings in Marshall, and damaged the town hall.

== Geography ==
Marshall is in southern Madison County, 19 miles (31 km) by road northwest of Asheville. The townsite is blocked on one side by the French Broad River and on all other sides by steep mountainous terrain. Madison County residents say Marshall is "a block wide, a mile long, sky high and hell deep."

U.S. Route 70 Business passes through the center of town as Main Street, while U.S. Routes 25 and 70 bypass the town to the northeast. The combined highways lead southeast to Asheville and northwest 40 miles (64 km) to Newport, Tennessee.

According to the U.S. Census Bureau, the town of Marshall has a total area of 4.2 square miles (11 km^{2}), of which 4.0 square miles (10 km^{2}) are land and 0.2 square miles (0.5 km^{2}), or 5.21%, are water. The French Broad River, one of the major river systems of western North Carolina, flows westward through the south side of the town.

=== Climate ===
According to the Köppen Climate Classification system, Marshall has a humid subtropical climate, abbreviated "Cfa" on climate maps. The hottest temperature recorded in Marshall was 102 °F (38.9 °C) on September 6, 1925, July 21–22, 1926, and July 29, 1952, while the coldest temperature recorded was −18 °F (−27.8 °C) on January 21, 1985.

Climate data for Marshall, North Carolina, 1991–2020 normals, extremes 1898–present
Month	Jan	Feb	Mar	Apr	May	Jun	Jul	Aug	Sep	Oct	Nov	Dec	Year
Record high °F (°C)	79 (26)	84 (29)	90 (32)	94 (34)	96 (36)	100 (38)	102 (39)	101 (38)	102 (39)	92 (33)	84 (29)	78 (26)	102 (39)
Mean maximum °F (°C)	67.0 (19.4)	70.5 (21.4)	77.8 (25.4)	85.0 (29.4)	86.8 (30.4)	90.1 (32.3)	91.8 (33.2)	91.1 (32.8)	89.0 (31.7)	83.2 (28.4)	75.2 (24.0)	67.0 (19.4)	92.9 (33.8)
Mean daily maximum °F (°C)	46.5 (8.1)	50.7 (10.4)	58.7 (14.8)	68.8 (20.4)	76.0 (24.4)	82.2 (27.9)	85.1 (29.5)	84.2 (29.0)	79.4 (26.3)	69.9 (21.1)	58.8 (14.9)	49.3 (9.6)	67.5 (19.7)
Daily mean °F (°C)	35.0 (1.7)	38.2 (3.4)	45.1 (7.3)	53.6 (12.0)	61.9 (16.6)	69.4 (20.8)	73.1 (22.8)	72.2 (22.3)	66.5 (19.2)	55.4 (13.0)	44.5 (6.9)	37.8 (3.2)	54.4 (12.4)
Mean daily minimum °F (°C)	23.5 (−4.7)	25.7 (−3.5)	31.2 (−0.4)	38.3 (3.5)	47.8 (8.8)	56.6 (13.7)	61.1 (16.2)	60.2 (15.7)	53.5 (11.9)	40.9 (4.9)	30.2 (−1.0)	26.2 (−3.2)	41.3 (5.2)
Mean minimum °F (°C)	5.2 (−14.9)	10.3 (−12.1)	15.9 (−8.9)	24.2 (−4.3)	33.4 (0.8)	45.2 (7.3)	53.3 (11.8)	51.4 (10.8)	40.0 (4.4)	25.9 (−3.4)	16.9 (−8.4)	11.4 (−11.4)	2.5 (−16.4)
Record low °F (°C)	−18 (−28)	−11 (−24)	−3 (−19)	11 (−12)	27 (−3)	31 (−1)	41 (5)	41 (5)	28 (−2)	16 (−9)	3 (−16)	−15 (−26)	−18 (−28)
Average precipitation inches (mm)	3.26 (83)	2.84 (72)	3.81 (97)	3.71 (94)	3.76 (96)	4.23 (107)	4.38 (111)	3.83 (97)	3.36 (85)	2.26 (57)	2.84 (72)	3.36 (85)	41.64 (1,056)
Average snowfall inches (cm)	6.5 (17)	6.6 (17)	4.3 (11)	0.8 (2.0)	0.0 (0.0)	0.0 (0.0)	0.0 (0.0)	0.0 (0.0)	0.0 (0.0)	0.1 (0.25)	0.3 (0.76)	7.0 (18)	25.6 (66.01)
Average extreme snow depth inches (cm)	3.3 (8.4)	2.3 (5.8)	2.2 (5.6)	0.3 (0.76)	0.0 (0.0)	0.0 (0.0)	0.0 (0.0)	0.0 (0.0)	0.0 (0.0)	0.0 (0.0)	0.2 (0.51)	3.5 (8.9)	7.2 (18)
Average precipitation days (≥ 0.01 in)	13.4	12.6	13.7	12.3	12.6	13.5	13.3	11.6	9.2	8.7	9.6	12.3	142.8
Average snowy days (≥ 0.1 in)	3.9	3.0	2.0	0.4	0.0	0.0	0.0	0.0	0.0	0.1	0.4	2.4	12.2
Source 1: NOAA
Source 2: National Weather Service

== Demographics ==
Historical population
Census	Pop.	Note	%±
1880	175		—
1890	203		16.0%
1900	337		66.0%
1910	802		138.0%
1920	748		−6.7%
1930	1,132		51.3%
1940	1,160		2.5%
1950	983		−15.3%
1960	926		−5.8%
1970	982		6.0%
1980	809		−17.6%
1990	809		0.0%
2000	840		3.8%
2010	872		3.8%
2020	777		−10.9%
U.S. Decennial Census

Marshall is part of the Asheville metropolitan area.

=== 2020 census ===
Marshall racial composition
Race	Number	Percentage
White (non-Hispanic)	698	89.83%
Native American	8	1.03%
Asian	3	0.39%
Other/Mixed	30	3.86%
Hispanic or Latino	38	4.89%

As of the 2020 United States census, there were 777 people, 346 households, and 195 families residing in the town.

=== 2000 census ===
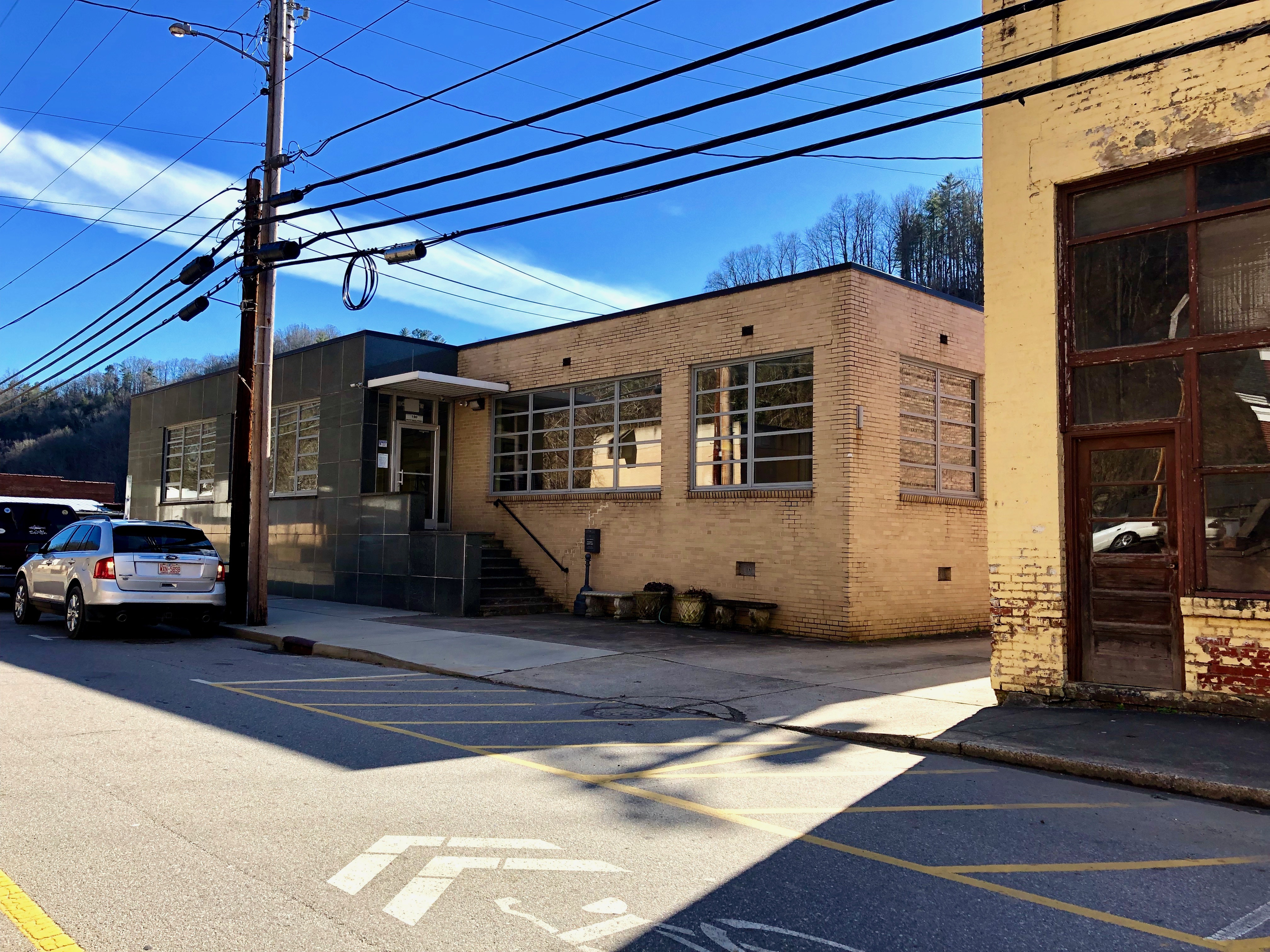
Town hall

As of the census of 2000, there were 842 people, 390 households, and 225 families residing in the town. The population density was 240.1 people per square mile (92.7 people/km^{2}). There were 443 housing units at an average density of 126.6 per square mile (48.9/km^{2}). The racial makeup of the town was 98.57% White, 0.48% African American, 0.36% Native American, 0.24% Asian, 0.12% from other races, and 0.24% from two or more races. Hispanic or Latino of any race were 0.60% of the population.

There were 390 households, out of which 23.1% had children under the age of 18 living with them, 39.2% were married couples living together, 15.4% had a female householder with no husband present, and 42.3% were non-families. 37.9% of all households were made up of individuals, and 19.5% had someone living alone who was 65 years of age or older. The average household size was 2.12 and the average family size was 2.81.

In the town, the population was spread out, with 21.7% under the age of 18, 6.8% from 18 to 24, 28.3% from 25 to 44, 22.0% from 45 to 64, and 21.2% who were 65 years of age or older. The median age was 40 years. For every 100 females, there were 85.8 males. For every 100 females age 18 and over, there were 75.5 males.

The median income for a household in the town was $24,188, and the median income for a family was $36,250. Males had a median income of $26,172 versus $22,875 for females. The per capita income for the town was $16,245. About 13.7% of families and 23.4% of the population were below the poverty line, including 29.6% of those under age 18 and 18.8% of those age 65 or over.

== In the media ==
The Amazon Prime Video series The Peripheral shot scenes in the town on September 24, 2021.

Independent filmmakers Joel Haver and Dylan Dexter released the film 31 Days in Marshall, North Carolina in 2019. The film was shot entirely in Marshall in 2017, and features multiple townsfolk in both the cast as well as background musical talent.

Wiley Cash's 2012 debut novel, A Land More Kind Than Home, is set in Marshall and the surrounding area.
