= Madison County Courthouse (North Carolina) =

Historic courthouse in North Carolina, US

- U.S. National Register of Historic Places
- U.S. Historic district – Contributing property
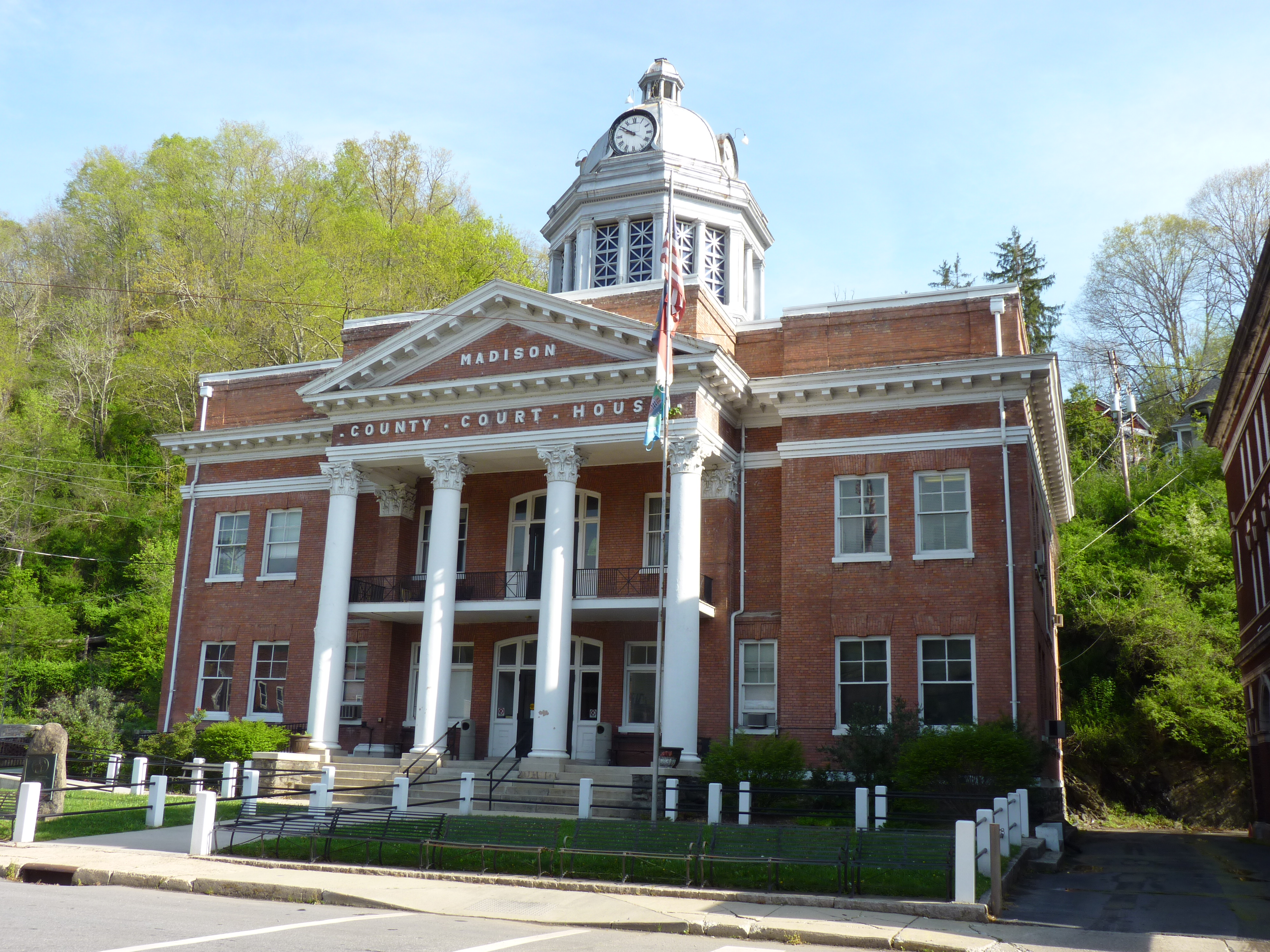
- Madison County Courthouse, April 2012

- Location within North Carolina Location within the United States
- Interactive map showing the location of Madison County Courthouse
- Location: Main St., Marshall, North Carolina
- Coordinates: 35°47′51″N 82°41′3″W
- Area: less than one acre
- Built: 1907
- Built by: Blue Ridge Construction Co.
- Architect: Smith & Carrier
- Architectural style: Classical Revival
- MPS: North Carolina County Courthouses TR
- NRHP reference No.: 79001732
- Added to NRHP: May 10, 1979

Madison County Courthouse is a historic courthouse building located at Marshall, Madison County, North Carolina. It was designed by noted Asheville architectural firm of Smith & Carrier and built in 1907. It is two-story, brick, Classical Revival-style building. It has a hipped roof topped by a four-stage polygonal cupola. The front facade features a tetrastyle pedimented Corinthian order portico.

It was listed on the National Register of Historic Places in 1979. It is located in the Marshall Main Street Historic District.
