= Hot Springs Historic District (Hot Springs, North Carolina) =

Historic district in North Carolina, United States

- U.S. National Register of Historic Places
- U.S. Historic district
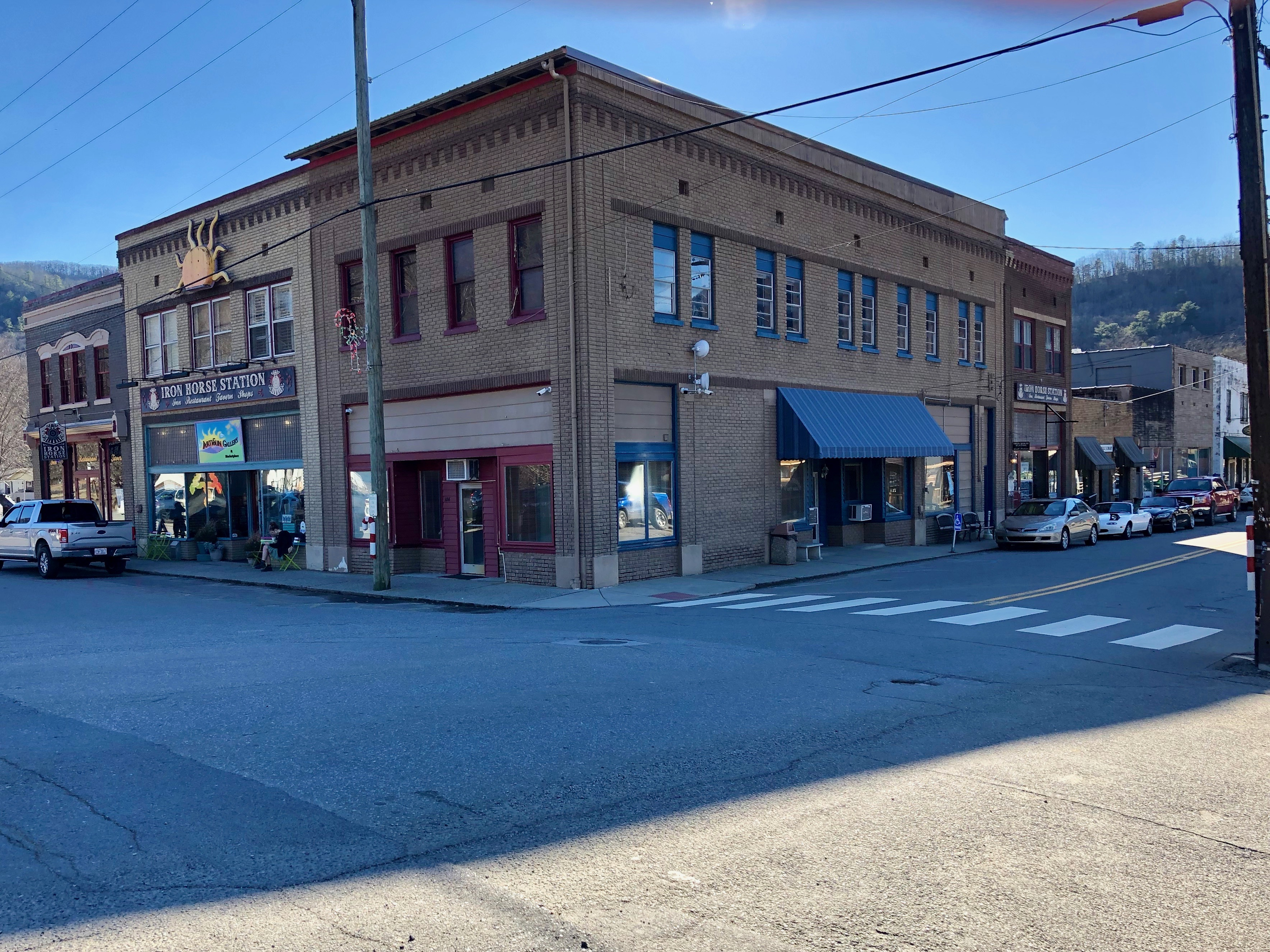
- Hot Springs Historic District, January 2019

- Location within North Carolina Location within the United States
- Location: Roughly bounded by Bridge St., Andrews Ave. S. and Meadow Ln., Hot Springs, North Carolina
- Coordinates: 35°53′32″N 82°49′41″W
- Area: 9 acres (36,000 m^{2})
- NRHP reference No.: 08001413
- Added to NRHP: February 5, 2009

Hot Springs Historic District in North Carolina is a historic district that was listed on the National Register of Historic Places in 2009. The National Park Service states:

This district is significant as the historic center of a small mountain community in the northwest corner of Madison County, NC. Once natural warm springs were discovered by settlers in the early nineteenth century, the town became one of the earliest resort communities in the state.

It was listed on the National Register of Historic Places in February, 2009.

The statue was the Highlighted Property of the Week when the National Park Service released its weekly list of February 13, 2009.

The historic district was devasted by flooding caused by Hurricane Helene on September 27th, 2024.
