= Spring Creek, North Carolina =

Spring Creek
- Unincorporated community
- Location within the state of North Carolina
- Coordinates: 35°47′55″N 82°51′16″W
- Country: United States
- State: North Carolina
- County: Madison County
- Elevation: 2,103 ft (641 m)
- Time zone: UTC-5 (Eastern (EST))
  - Summer (DST): UTC-4 (EDT)
- ZIP Code: 28743 (Hot Springs)
- Area code: 828
- GNIS feature ID: 1022743

Spring Creek is an unincorporated community in Madison County, North Carolina, United States. Located along NC 209, north of Trust and Luck, the community was named after Spring Creek, which is adjacent to the highway. The community is part of the Asheville Metropolitan Statistical Area.
