= Paint Rock, North Carolina =

- Unincorporated community
- Location within North Carolina Location within the United States
- Coordinates: 35°55′50″N 82°53′23″W
- Country: United States
- State: North Carolina
- County: Madison County
- Elevation: 1,266 ft (386 m)
- Time zone: UTC-5 (Eastern (EST))
  - Summer (DST): UTC-4 (EDT)
- ZIP Code: 28743 (Hot Springs)
- Area code: 828
- GNIS feature ID: 1021780

Paint Rock is an unincorporated community in Madison County, North Carolina, United States. The community is named after the nearby mountain of the same name along the North Carolina–Tennessee state line. Located along the south banks of the French Broad River, the community is accessible via Paint Rock Road (SR 1300), which connects to US 25/US 70. The Norfolk Southern S-Line also travels through the community. The community is part of the Asheville Metropolitan Statistical Area.
