= North Carolina Highway 63 =

State highway in North Carolina, US

North Carolina Highway 63

Route information
- Maintained by NCDOT
- Length: 26.9 mi (43.3 km)
- Existed: 1940–present

Major junctions
- West end: NC 209 in Trust
- East end: US 19 / US 23 / US 74A in Asheville

Location
- Country: United States
- State: North Carolina
- Counties: Madison, Buncombe

Highway system
- North Carolina Highway System; Interstate; US; State; Scenic
← NC 62	→ US 64

North Carolina Highway 63 (NC 63) is a primary state highway in the U.S. state of North Carolina. The highway runs east–west, connecting western Madison County with Asheville.

== Route description ==
NC 63 is a 26.9-mile (43.3 km) two-lane mountain highway that begins at the community of Trust at NC 209. Going east, it stays along the north bank of the Friezeland Creek before climbing to its highest point at Doggett Gap. It quickly descends down 1,500 ft (460 m) to the mountain valley area below, in what can be described as aggressively twisty. Along the banks of Little Sandymush Creek, it passes through the community of Canto as it enters Buncombe County. After passing by Grassy Knob, NC 63 stops being a hard mountain highway, as it goes through Leicester and finally into Asheville, where it ends at Patton Avenue. Patton Avenue here carries U.S. Routes 19, 23, and 74A.

== History ==
Established 1929 as a new primary route, NC 63 went from Trust, through Leicester, and Woodfin, to Asheville at Merrimon Avenue. In 1930, the highway was truncated west at Canto, replaced by NC 213 from Marshall. In 1951, NC 63 was re-extended back to Trust, as NC 213 was rerouted out of Canto. In 1952, NC 63 was rerouted along existing secondary roads to a new eastern terminus along Patton Avenue in Asheville.

== Major intersections ==
County	Location	mi	km	Destinations	Notes
Madison	Trust	0.0	0.0	NC 209 – Lake Junaluska, Hot Springs	
Buncombe	Asheville	26.9	43.3	US 19 / US 23 / US 74A (Patton Avenue)	
1.000 mi = 1.609 km; 1.000 km = 0.621 mi
