= Spring Creek (Madison County, North Carolina) =

Coordinates: 35°47′55″N 82°51′16″W

Spring Creek is a tributary stream of the French Broad River in Madison County, North Carolina with a length of approximately 17 miles. It flows in much of its lower course through a section of the Pisgah National Forest and passes the communities of Trust, Luck, and Joe. It joins the French Broad river in Hot Springs, North Carolina.
