= North Carolina Highway 209 =

State highway in North Carolina, US

North Carolina Highway 209

Route information
- Maintained by NCDOT
- Length: 36.6 mi (58.9 km)
- Existed: 1921–present

Major junctions
- South end: US 19 / US 23 / US 74 / US 23 Bus. in Lake Junaluska
- I-40 near Lake Junaluska
- North end: US 25 / US 70 in Hot Springs

Location
- Country: United States
- State: North Carolina
- Counties: Haywood, Madison

Highway system
- North Carolina Highway System; Interstate; US; State; Scenic
← NC 208	→ NC 210

North Carolina Highway 209 (NC 209) is a primary state highway in the U.S. state of North Carolina. The highway runs north–south from Lake Junaluska to Hot Springs.

== Route description ==
NC 209 is a 36.6-mile-long (58.9 km) two-lane mountain highway that begins at a busy intersection with US 19/US 23/US 74/US 23 Business in Lake Junaluska. Going north, it crosses over I-40 and through some valley farmlands. The road bends east at Max Patch Road and begins some curvy climbing on and around Hebo Mountain, entering Madison County at Betsy's Gap (3,895 ft (1,187 m), highest point on route). Entering the Spring Creek Valley, it passes through the communities of Luck and Trust, before reaching Spring Creek; from there the remaining 10 miles (16 km) becomes an aggressively winding road, and is not recommended for commercial trucks. Once past all the twists and turns, travelers arrive in Hot Springs, where the highway ends at US 25/US 70.

From just north of where the highway crosses the Pigeon River to NC 63, NC 209 forms the eastern border of the Pisgah National Forest. North of NC 63, the highway is completely within the borders of the forest to its northern terminus.

=== Scenic byway ===
NC 209 is part of one scenic byway in the state (indicated by a Scenic Byways sign).

The Appalachian Medley is a 45-mile (72 km) byway from near Lake Junaluska to Walnut; it is known for several recreational areas, the Appalachian Trail, and its scenic mountain drive. NC 209 forms the main part of the scenic byway, connecting with US 25/US 70, in Hot Springs, where it continues the rest of the route.

== History ==
Established in 1921 as an original state route, it went from NC 10, in Lake Junaluska to NC 20, in Hot Springs. In 1954, NC 209 was extended a .5-mile (0.80 km) south to its current southern terminus.

== Junction list ==
County	Location	mi	km	Destinations	Notes
Haywood	Lake Junaluska	0.0	0.0	US 19 / US 23 / US 74 / US 23 Bus. south – Waynesville, Sylva, Cherokee, Asheville	Exit 104 (US 74)
Haywood		3.7	6.0	I-40 – Asheville, Knoxville	Exit 24 (I-40)
Madison	Trust	22.0	35.4	NC 63 east – Asheville	
Madison	Hot Springs	36.6	58.9	US 25 / US 70 – Marshall, Asheville, Newport	
1.000 mi = 1.609 km; 1.000 km = 0.621 mi
