= Barnard, North Carolina =

- Unincorporated community
- Location within North Carolina Location within the United States
- Coordinates: 35°50′22″N 82°45′15″W
- Country: United States
- State: North Carolina
- County: Madison County
- Founded: 1830
- Elevation: 1,535 ft (468 m)
- Time zone: UTC-5 (Eastern (EST))
  - Summer (DST): UTC-4 (EDT)
- ZIP Code: 28753 (Marshall)
- Area code: 828
- GNIS feature ID: 1018967

Barnard is an unincorporated community in Madison County, North Carolina, United States. The community, originally known as Barnard's Station, had a post office established as early as 1830 and was named after an early settler in the area. Located along the banks of the French Broad River in central Madison County, the community is accessible via Barnard Road (SR 1151), which connects to NC 213. The Norfolk Southern S-Line also passes through the community. The community is part of the Asheville Metropolitan Statistical Area.
