= North Carolina Highway 208 =

State highway in Madison County, North Carolina, US

North Carolina Highway 208

Route information
- Maintained by NCDOT
- Length: 9.1 mi (14.6 km)
- Existed: 1921–present

Major junctions
- South end: US 25 / US 70 in Hurricane
- North end: SR 70 at the Tennessee state line near Allenstand

Location
- Country: United States
- State: North Carolina
- Counties: Madison

Highway system
- North Carolina Highway System; Interstate; US; State; Scenic
← NC 207	→ NC 209

North Carolina Highway 208 (NC 208) is a primary state highway in the U.S. state of North Carolina. The highway serves as the most direct route between Asheville and Greeneville, Tennessee, through the Bald Mountains.

== Route description ==
NC 208 is a 9.1-mile (14.6 km) two-lane mountain highway that begins in the community of Hurricane and goes north hugging the banks of Big Laurel Creek and (after a curved bridge) Shelton Laurel Creek. Once at Belva, the highway goes northwest towards Greeneville, Tennessee, passing through the community of Allenstand, before reaching the state line at Allen Gap (2,234 ft (681 m), highest point on route). Just beyond the state line, the Appalachian Trail crosses the highway. The entire highway is within the confines of the Pisgah National Forest.

== History ==
Established in 1921 as an original state highway and has not changed since.

== Junction list ==
The entire route is in Madison County.

Location	mi	km	Destinations	Notes
Hurricane	0.0	0.0	US 25 / US 70 – Hot Springs, Marshall, Asheville	
Belva	3.5	5.6	NC 212 east – White Rock	Western terminus of NC 212
	9.1	14.6	SR 70 north – Greeneville	Tennessee state line
1.000 mi = 1.609 km; 1.000 km = 0.621 mi
