= North Carolina Highway 213 =

State highway in Madison County, North Carolina, US

North Carolina Highway 213

Route information
- Maintained by NCDOT
- Length: 14.9 mi (24.0 km)
- Existed: 1928–present
- Tourist routes: Appalachian Medley

Major junctions
- West end: Walnut Drive in Walnut
- US 25 / US 70 in Walnut
- East end: I-26 / US 19 / US 23 in Mars Hill

Location
- Country: United States
- State: North Carolina
- Counties: Madison

Highway system
- North Carolina Highway System; Interstate; US; State; Scenic
← NC 212	→ NC 214

North Carolina Highway 213 (NC 213) is a primary state highway in the U.S. state of North Carolina. The highway connects Marshall with Walnut and Mars Hill.

== Route description ==
NC 213 begins at the intersection of Walnut Drive (SR 1439) and Barnard Road (SR 1151) in the community of Walnut. Going southeast, along Walnut Drive, it connects and overlaps with US 25 and US 70 towards Marshall. At the Hayes Run Road interchange, NC 213 departs from US 25/US 70 and proceeds northeast towards Mars Hill and passing through Petersburg along the way. As NC 213 enters Mars Hill, it becomes Cascade Street as it goes through Mars Hill College. At the town's Main Street, it changes to Carl Eller Road. At the eastern edge of Mars Hill, NC 213 ends at an interchange with I-26/US 19/US 23 (exit 11) and Calvin Edney Road (SR 1549).

Signage of NC 213 between Walnut and Marshall does not exist and only begin at the US 25 Business/US 70 Business intersection, in Marshall.

== History ==
Established in 1928 as a renumbering of NC 69 from US 70/NC 20 in Marshall to US 19/NC 69 near Forks of Ivy. In 1930, NC 213 was realigned around Petersburg leaving behind several secondary roads; also in the same year the highway was extended west onto new routing through Canto and renumbered NC 63 to Trust. In 1934, NC 213 was rerouted northeast from Mars Hill to intersect with US 19/US 23 replacing NC 31, while the route to Forks of Ivy was replaced by NC 36. By 1947, NC 213 was pushed back onto a new realignment of NC 36 near California Creek Road. In 1951, NC 213 was truncated west again in Marshall dropping to Canto and NC 63 regaining its original link to Trust.

In 1975, NC 213 was placed on new alignment between Marshall and Petersburg, leaving behind Silver Mill Road. Later that year, NC 213 was rerouted in Mars Hill, switching from Main Street to Carl Eller Road, then going southeast to US 19/US 23 and Calvin Edney Road (SR 1549). The old alignment along Main Street was briefly picked up by NC 36 before becoming a secondary road. In 1981, NC 213 was rerouted onto the new Marshall Bypass to Walnut.

=== North Carolina Highway 36 ===
North Carolina Highway 36
- Location: Mars Hill, North Carolina
- Length: 4.3 mi (6.9 km)
- Existed: 1952–1975

North Carolina Highway 36 (NC 36) was a primary highway that existed twice, both serving Mars Hill. The first NC 36 was established in 1934, traveling between US 19/US 23, near Forks of Ivy, to the Tennessee state line at Sam's Gap and continuing on as SR 81. Between 1937 and 1944, NC 36 was placed on new bypass south of Faust, its old alignment becoming Laurel Valley Road (SR 1503). In 1938, NC 36 was placed on new bypass east of Mars Hill, its old alignment becoming NC 36A. Around 1947, US 19/US 23 was also placed along the Mars Hill Bypass. In 1952, the first NC 36 was decommissioned when US 23 was rerouted along its route into Tennessee.

In 1952, the second NC 36 was established, replacing the southern half of NC 36A, between US 19/US 23 and NC 213. It remained as a short 1.9-mile (3.1 km) highway till October, 1975, when it was assigned the former northern half of NC 36A, thanks to a realignment of NC 213. However, the route change only lasted a month; in November, the decision was made to decommission the entire route instead, becoming Main Street/Forks of Ivy Road (SR 1609).

=== North Carolina Highway 36A ===
North Carolina Highway 36A
- Location: Mars Hill, North Carolina
- Length: 4.3 mi (6.9 km)
- Existed: 1938–1952

North Carolina Highway 36A (NC 36A) was an alternate route established in 1938 as a renumbering of NC 36 through Mars Hill, via Main Street. In 1952, NC 36A was replaced by the second NC 36 and NC 213, split at Cascade Street.

== Junction list ==
The entire route is in Madison County.

Location	mi	km	Destinations	Notes
Walnut	0.00	0.00	Barnard Road	Western terminus; road continues as Walnut Drive
	0.3	0.48	US 25 north / US 70 west	West end of US 25/US 70 overlap
	4.0	6.4	US 25 Bus. south / US 70 Bus. east (Main Street) – Downtown Marshall, Public Library	
	6.1	9.8	US 25 south / US 70 east – Weaverville, Asheville	Interchange; east end of US 25/US 70 overlap
Mars Hill	14.9	24.0	I-26 / US 19 / US 23 – Johnson City, Asheville	Eastern terminus; I-26 exit 11; road continues briefly as Carl Eller Road
1.000 mi = 1.609 km; 1.000 km = 0.621 mi: Concurrency terminus
