= Henry Ottinger House =

Historic house in North Carolina, United States

- U.S. National Register of Historic Places
- Location within North Carolina Location within the United States
- Location: 391 Boys Home Rd., near Hot Springs, North Carolina
- Coordinates: 35°54′35″N 82°51′13″W
- Area: 48 acres (19 ha)
- Built: c. 1855
- Architectural style: Greek Revival, Vernacular Greek Revival
- NRHP reference No.: 86000410
- Added to NRHP: March 6, 1986

Henry Ottinger House, also known as The Willows, is a historic home located near Hot Springs, Madison County, North Carolina. It was built about 1855, and is a two-story, three-bay, vernacular Greek Revival-style brick dwelling. It has double-pile plan with hipped roof and paired interior chimneys. The front facade features a two-story, single-bay entrance portico. Also on the property are the contributing major barn (1908), carriage house, and slaughter house.

It was listed on the National Register of Historic Places in 1986.
