= Madison Schools =

Madison Schools may refer to:

- Madison Consolidated Schools - Indiana
- Madison Public Schools - Madison, Connecticut
- Madison Local Schools District - Ohio
- Madison County Schools - Can refer to multiple school districts in multiple states
