= Sunnybank =

Sunnybank may refer to:

== Places ==
=== England ===
- The Sunny Bank area of Bury, Greater Manchester is sometimes incorrectly written as Sunnybank
- The Sunnybank Nature Reserve in Sheffield

=== Australia ===
- Sunnybank, a suburb of Brisbane
- The electoral district of Sunnybank in Brisbane
- Sunnybank, a former town that was absorbed into Brisbane
- Sunnybank, an area of Aberdeen

=== United States ===
- Sunnybank, a historic home in Hot Springs, North Carolina
- Sunnybank Kennels, founded by writer and dog breeder Albert Payson Terhune in Wayne, New Jersey

== See also ==
- Sunny Bank, a historic home in Albemarle County, Virginia
