= Hurricane, North Carolina =

- Unincorporated community
- Location within North Carolina Location within the United States
- Coordinates: 35°54′51″N 82°45′28″W
- Country: United States
- State: North Carolina
- County: Madison County
- Named for: Hurricane Creek
- Elevation: 1,598 ft (487 m)
- Time zone: UTC-5 (Eastern (EST))
  - Summer (DST): UTC-4 (EDT)
- ZIP Codes: 28743 (Hot Springs); 28753 (Marshall)
- Area code: 828
- GNIS feature ID: 1012294

Hurricane (variant name: Hurricane Church) is an unincorporated community in Madison County, North Carolina, United States. The community is named after Little Hurricane Creek, a tributary of Big Laurel Creek and is centered at the intersection of US 25/US 70 and NC 208. The community is part of the Asheville Metropolitan Statistical Area.
