= Tennessee State Route 352 =

Highway in Tennessee

State Route 352
- TN 352 highlighted in red

Route information
- Maintained by TDOT
- Length: 10.3 mi (16.6 km)
- Existed: July 1, 1983–present

Major junctions
- East end: US 19W in Temple Hill
- West end: NC 212 at the North Carolina state line near Flag Pond

Location
- Country: United States
- State: Tennessee
- Counties: Unicoi

Highway system
- Tennessee State Routes; Interstate; US; State
| ← SR 351 | → SR 353 |

State Route 352 (SR 352) is a 10.3-mile-long (16.6 km) state highway that exists completely within Unicoi County in the eastern portion of the U.S. state of Tennessee, the area commonly called Tri-Cities region.

== Route description ==
SR 352 begins at a y-intersection with US 19W/SR 36 in the community of Temple Hill. The highway turns southwest to follow the former alignment of US 23 to pass through Flag Pond. In Flag Pond, it breaks away from the former US 23 alignment at another y-intersection, where it continues south into North Carolina as Old Asheville Highway. SR 352 then leaves Flag Pond and twists and turns its way through the mountainous terrain of Unicoi County. It ends at the North Carolina state line, where the roadway continues as NC 212.

SR 352 is a two-lane rural mountain highway for its entire length.

== Major intersections ==
The entire route is in Unicoi County.

| Location | mi | km | Destinations | Notes |
|---|---|---|---|---|
| Temple Hill | 10.3 | 16.6 | US 19W (Old Asheville Highway/Spivey Mountain Road/SR 36) to I-26 – Erwin, Cane River, NC | Eastern terminus |
| Flag Pond | | | Old Asheville Highway - Mars Hill, NC | Former US 23 |
| | 0.0 | 0.0 | NC 212 west – Hurricane | North Carolina state line; western terminus |
1.000 mi = 1.609 km; 1.000 km = 0.621 mi
