= West Canton, North Carolina =

- Census-designated place
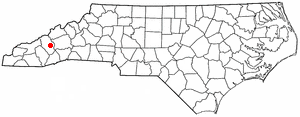
- Location of West Canton, North Carolina
- Coordinates: 35°32′18″N 82°52′02″W
- Country: United States
- State: North Carolina
- County: Haywood

Area
  - Total: 1.37 sq mi (3.56 km^{2})
  - Land: 1.37 sq mi (3.56 km^{2})
  - Water: 0 sq mi (0.00 km^{2})
- Elevation: 2,681 ft (817 m)

Population (2020)
  - Total: 1,265
  - Density: 920.6/sq mi (355.46/km^{2})
- Time zone: UTC-5 (Eastern (EST))
  - Summer (DST): UTC-4 (EDT)
- FIPS code: 37-72150
- GNIS feature ID: 2402999

West Canton is an unincorporated community and census-designated place (CDP) in Haywood County, North Carolina, United States. As of the 2020 census, West Canton had a population of 1,265. It is part of the Asheville Metropolitan Statistical Area.

== Geography ==
West Canton is located in east-central Haywood County. It is bordered to the east by the town of Canton.

U.S. Routes 19 and 23 form the southern boundary of the CDP. The combined highway leads west 5 miles (8 km) to Lake Junaluska and east through Canton 20 miles (32 km) to Asheville. Waynesville, the Haywood county seat, is 10 miles (16 km) to the southwest via US-23.

According to the United States Census Bureau, the West Canton CDP has a total area of 1.4 square miles (3.6 km^{2}), all land. The Pigeon River, a west-flowing stream that is part of the Tennessee River basin, forms the northern edge of the CDP.

== Demographics ==
Historical population
Census	Pop.	Note	%±
2020	1,265		—
U.S. Decennial Census

As of the census of 2000, there were 1,156 people, 488 households, and 339 families residing in the CDP. The population density was 840.7 inhabitants per square mile (324.6/km^{2}). There were 525 housing units at an average density of 381.8 per square mile (147.4/km^{2}). The racial makeup of the CDP was 97.84% White, 0.69% African American, 0.35% Native American, 0.09% Pacific Islander, and 1.04% from two or more races. Hispanic or Latino of any race were 1.30% of the population.

There were 488 households, out of which 28.1% had children under the age of 18 living with them, 58.2% were married couples living together, 9.6% had a female householder with no husband present, and 30.5% were non-families. 26.8% of all households were made up of individuals, and 14.5% had someone living alone who was 65 years of age or older. The average household size was 2.37 and the average family size was 2.84.

In the CDP, the population was spread out, with 21.1% under the age of 18, 5.2% from 18 to 24, 29.2% from 25 to 44, 26.1% from 45 to 64, and 18.4% who were 65 years of age or older. The median age was 41 years. For every 100 females, there were 84.7 males. For every 100 females age 18 and over, there were 85.0 males.

The median income for a household in the CDP was $30,694, and the median income for a family was $34,922. Males had a median income of $40,347 versus $22,056 for females. The per capita income for the CDP was $15,587. About 8.1% of families and 11.8% of the population were below the poverty line, including 16.2% of those under age 18 and 11.7% of those age 65 or over.

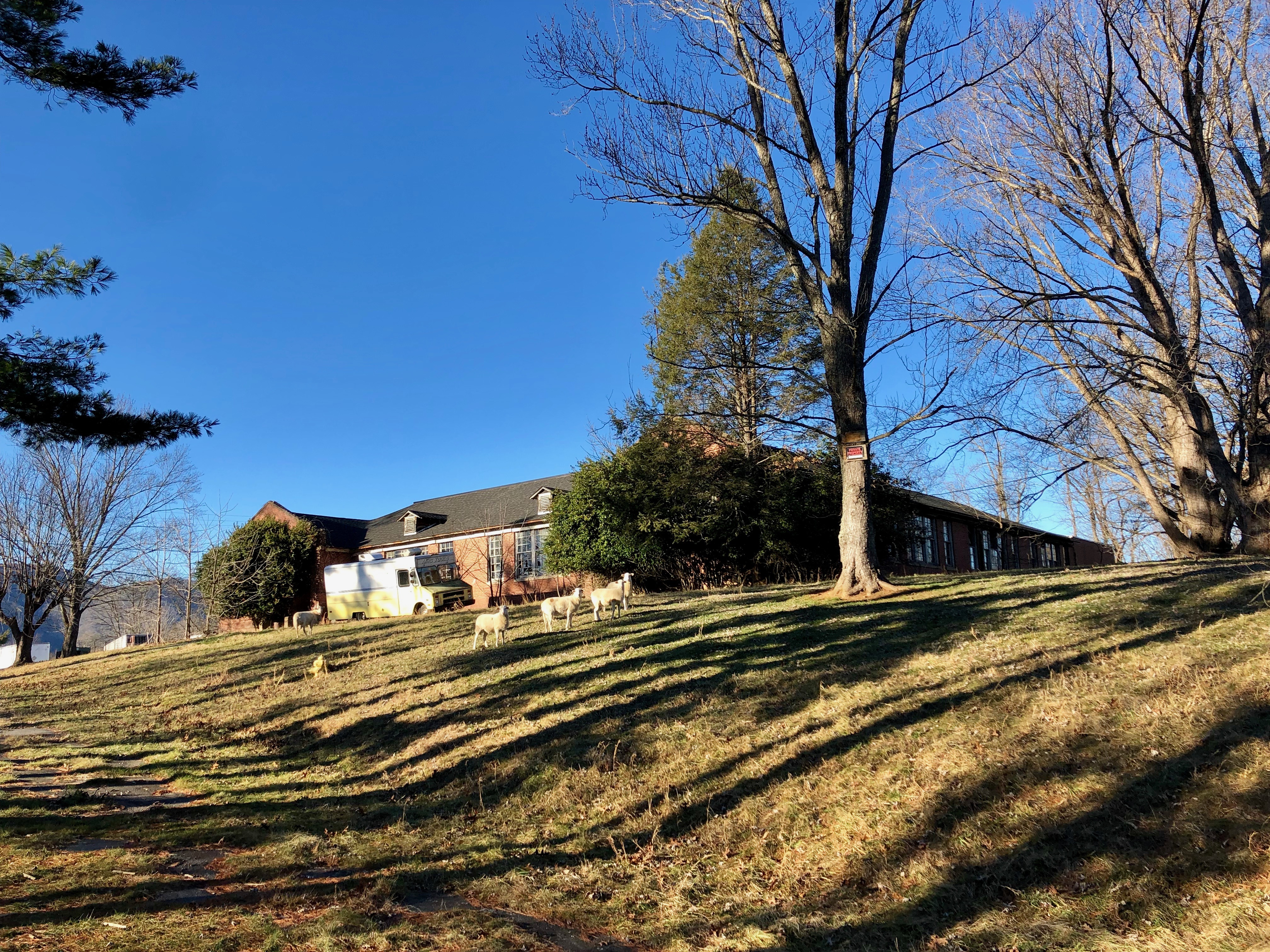
The Former West Canton Elementary School

== History ==
Prior to European colonization, the area that is now West Canton was inhabited by the Cherokee people and other Indigenous peoples for thousands of years. The Cherokee in Western North Carolina are known as the Eastern Band of Cherokee Indians, a federally recognized tribe.
