= Madison High School (North Carolina) =

American public school in North Carolina

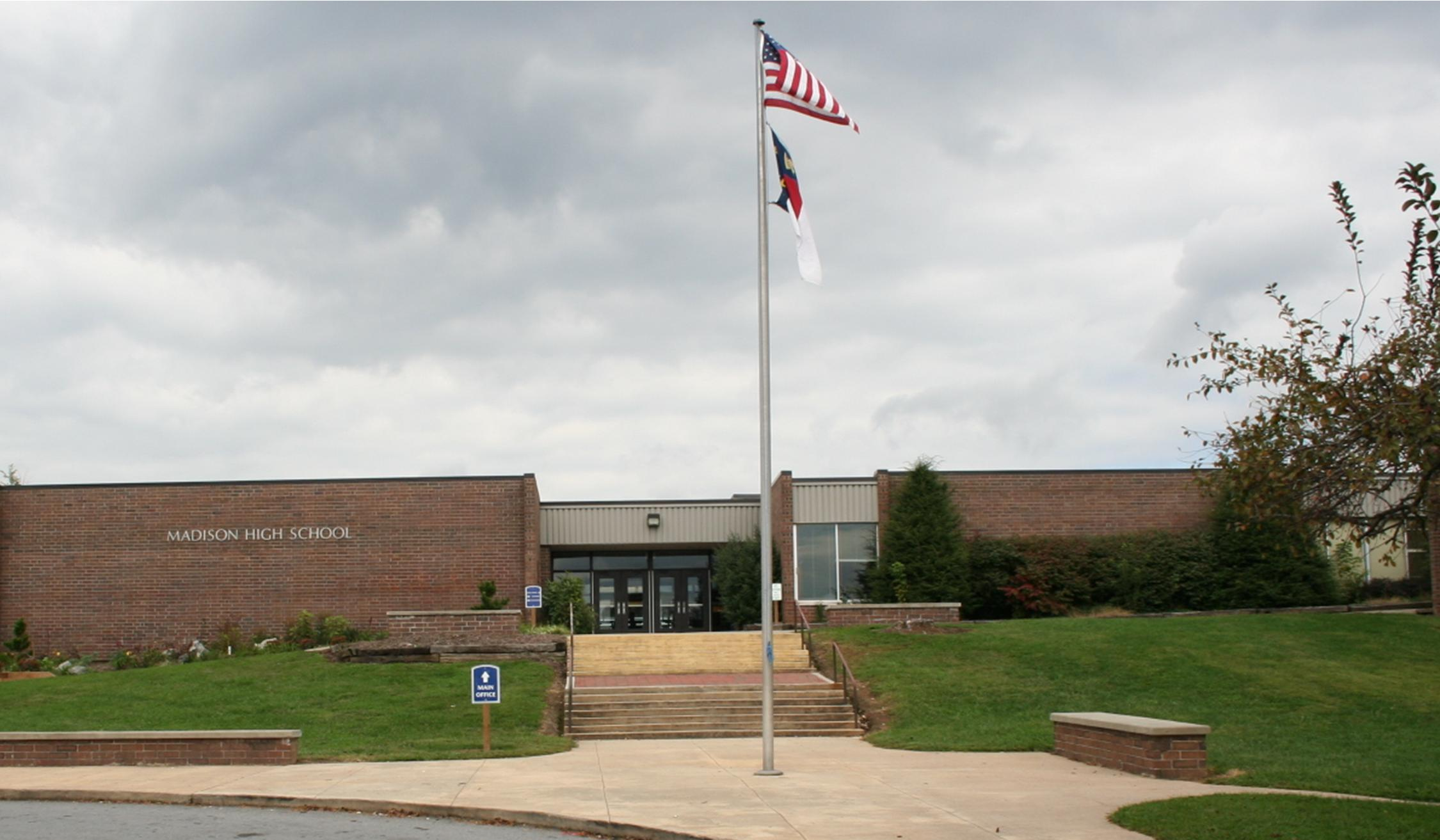
- Exterior of Madison High School

Location
- 5740 US Hwy 25-70; Marshall, North Carolina 28753; United States
- Coordinates: 35°48′55″N 82°40′26″W

Information
- Type: Public
- Established: 1974 (52 years ago)
- School district: Madison County Schools
- Superintendent: Will Hoffman
- CEEB code: 342500
- Principal: Toby Anderson
- Teaching staff: 44.29 (FTE)
- Grades: 9–12
- Enrollment: 391 (2023-2024)
- Student to teacher ratio: 8.83
- Colors: Red, white, and blue
- Team name: Madison Patriots
- Website: mhs.madisonk12.net

Madison High School is a public high school located in Marshall, North Carolina.

== Facilities ==
Madison High School has several facilities, including:

- 44 Classrooms
- 5 Workshops
- 1 Greenhouse
- A Shooting Range for the JROTC Program
- 6 Science Labs
- A 1-Mile Public Walking Trail

== Location ==
Madison High School and Madison County Schools' Central Office are located on 54 acres of land owned by the Madison County Board of Education. Aside from the main building, the campus includes: an Alternative Learning Program facility, an external Masonry classroom and shop, a Softball Field, and O.E. Roberts Stadium featuring artificial turf, an Olympic-size track, and a field house. Along with these buildings, another school, Madison Early College High School (MECHS) was built in 2018. Prior to the construction of the new campus in 1974, the High School was located in a building just outside of Mars Hill Elementary in Mars Hill.

== Population ==
Madison High has decreased in size since it opened in 1974 from over 800 students to under 600 students.

== Transportation ==
Sixteen buses serve Madison High School and Madison Middle School. The average ride time for students comes out at around an hour and a half, and the average bus route is 23 miles one way. Buses cover an average of 4,500 mi^{2} a day in Madison County.

== Notable alumni ==
- Nick McDevitt, college basketball head coach
