= White Rock, North Carolina =

White Rock
- Unincorporated community
- Location within the state of North Carolina
- Coordinates: 35°57′09″N 82°42′06″W
- Country: United States
- State: North Carolina
- County: Madison County
- Elevation: 1,880 ft (573 m)
- Time zone: UTC-5 (Eastern (EST))
  - Summer (DST): UTC-4 (EDT)
- ZIP Code: 28753 (Marshall)
- Area code: 828
- GNIS feature ID: 1023208

White Rock (variant name: Whiterock) is an unincorporated community in Madison County, North Carolina, United States. The community is located along Chapel Hill Road (SR 1316), which connects to nearby NC 212. The community is part of the Asheville Metropolitan Statistical Area.
