= Joe, North Carolina =

- Unincorporated community
- Location within North Carolina Location within the United States
- Coordinates: 35°47′48″N 82°54′32″W
- Country: United States
- State: North Carolina
- County: Madison
- Elevation: 2,644 ft (806 m)
- Time zone: UTC-5 (Eastern (EST))
  - Summer (DST): UTC-4 (EDT)
- ZIP Code: 28743 (Hot Springs)
- Area code: 828
- GNIS feature ID: 1024894

Joe is an unincorporated community south-southwest of Hot Springs, in Madison County, North Carolina, United States. The community is a part of the Asheville Metropolitan Statistical Area.

A post office called Joe was established in 1894, and remained in operation until 1953. Joe was the name of a female first settler.
