= Faust, North Carolina =

- Unincorporated community
- Location within North Carolina Location within the United States
- Coordinates: 35°54′40″N 82°31′48″W
- Country: United States
- State: North Carolina
- County: Madison County
- Elevation: 3,107 ft (947 m)
- Time zone: UTC-5 (Eastern (EST))
  - Summer (DST): UTC-4 (EDT)
- ZIP Code: 28754 (Mars Hill)
- Area code: 828
- GNIS feature ID: 1011187

Faust is an unincorporated community in Madison County, North Carolina, United States. The community is nestled in the Walnut Mountains, located along Laurel Valley Road (SR 1503), which connects to nearby US 23A. The community is part of the Asheville Metropolitan Statistical Area.
