= Sunnybank (Hot Springs, North Carolina) =

Historic house in North Carolina, United States

- U.S. National Register of Historic Places
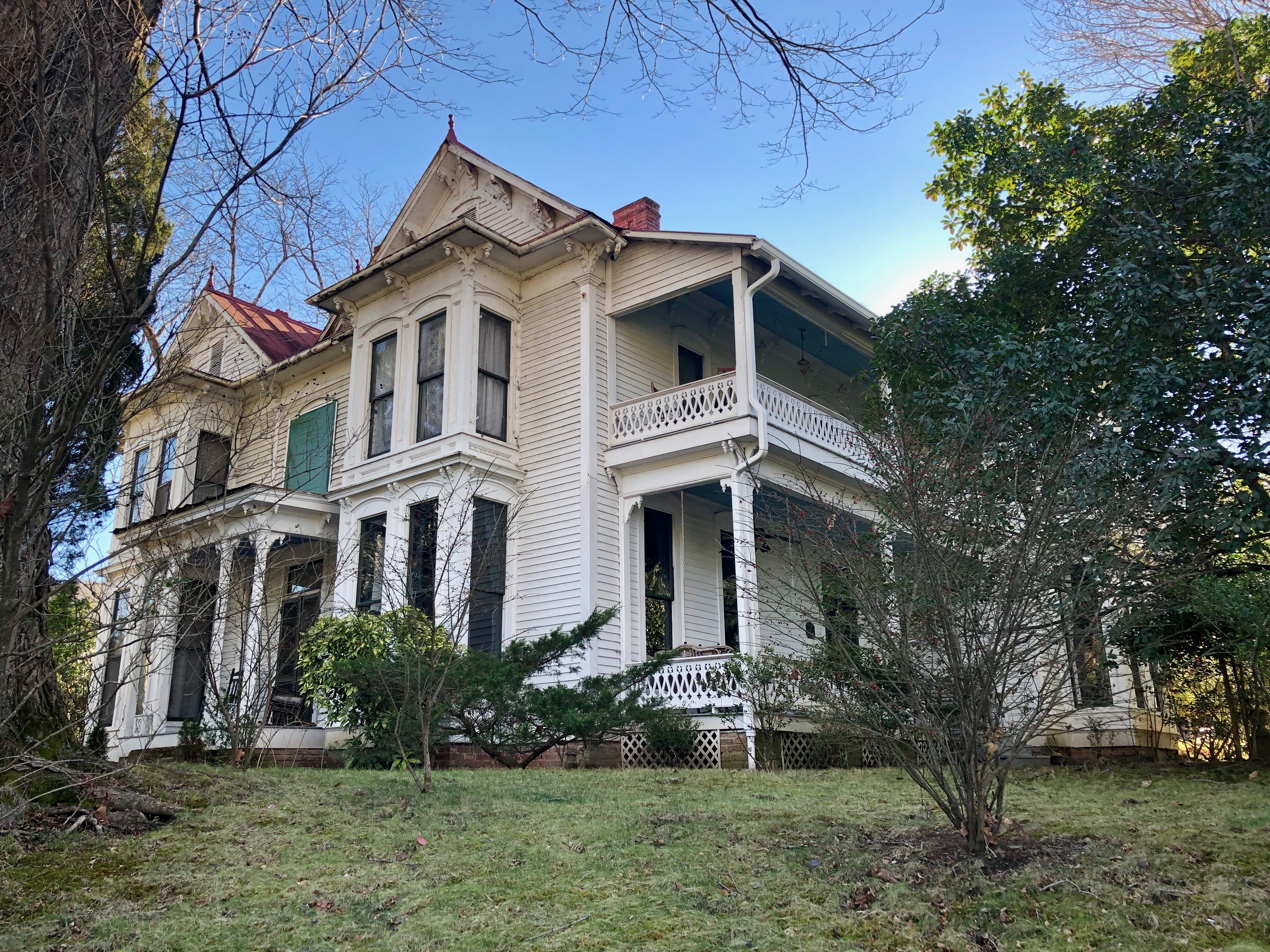
- Sunnybank, January 2019

- Location within North Carolina Location within the United States
- Location: NC 209 and Walnut St., Hot Springs, North Carolina
- Coordinates: 35°53′29″N 82°49′47″W
- Area: 1 acre (0.40 ha)
- Built: 1875
- Architectural style: Late 19th And 20th Century Revivals, Italianate revival
- NRHP reference No.: 80002883
- Added to NRHP: May 23, 1980

Sunnybank, also known as The Inn at Hot Springs, is a historic home located at Hot Springs, Madison County, North Carolina. It was built about 1875, and is a two-story, rambling Italianate style frame building. It has a complex roof system of intersecting gables with deep eaves and large curvilinear sawn brackets. It was built as a private summer home, then opened as a boardinghouse in 1912.

It was listed on the National Register of Historic Places in 1980.

== Gallery ==
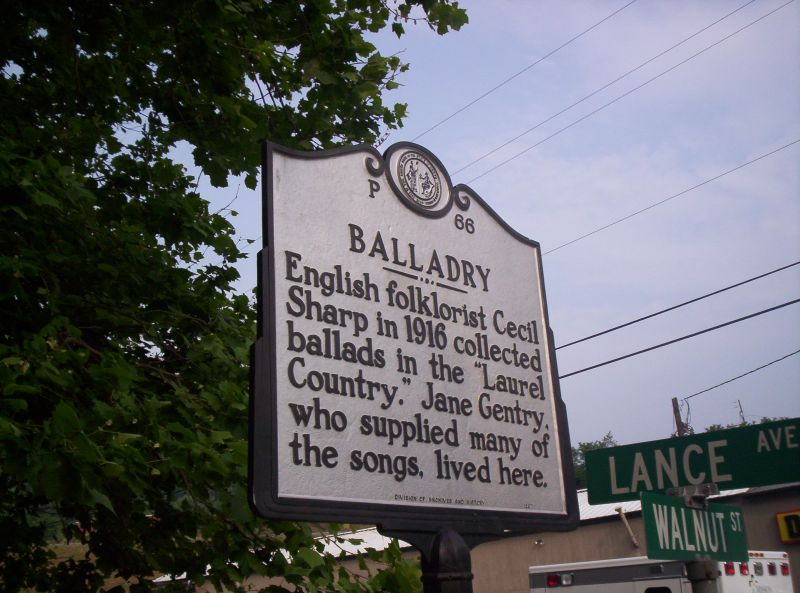
Historic marker commemorating Cecil Sharp
