= Petersburg, Madison County, North Carolina =

Petersburg
- Unincorporated community
- Location within the state of North Carolina
- Coordinates: 35°49′19″N 82°36′41″W
- Country: United States
- State: North Carolina
- County: Madison
- Elevation: 1,991 ft (607 m)
- Time zone: UTC-5 (Eastern (EST))
  - Summer (DST): UTC-4 (EDT)
- ZIP Code: 28753 (Marshall)
- Area code: 828
- GNIS feature ID: 992096

Petersburg is an unincorporated community on North Carolina Highway 213, in south-central Madison County, North Carolina, United States. It lies at an elevation of 1991 feet (607 m). The community is part of the Asheville Metropolitan Statistical Area. It is the hometown of the country music group "The Petersburg Boys", formerly known as "The Sawmill Gang".
