= Madison County Schools =

Madison County Schools can refer to:

- Madison County Schools (Alabama)
- Madison County Schools (Florida)
- Madison County Schools (Kentucky)
- Madison County Schools (North Carolina)
- Madison County School District (Georgia)
- Madison County School District (Mississippi)
