= Camp Academy =

Historic school building in North Carolina, United States

- U.S. National Register of Historic Places
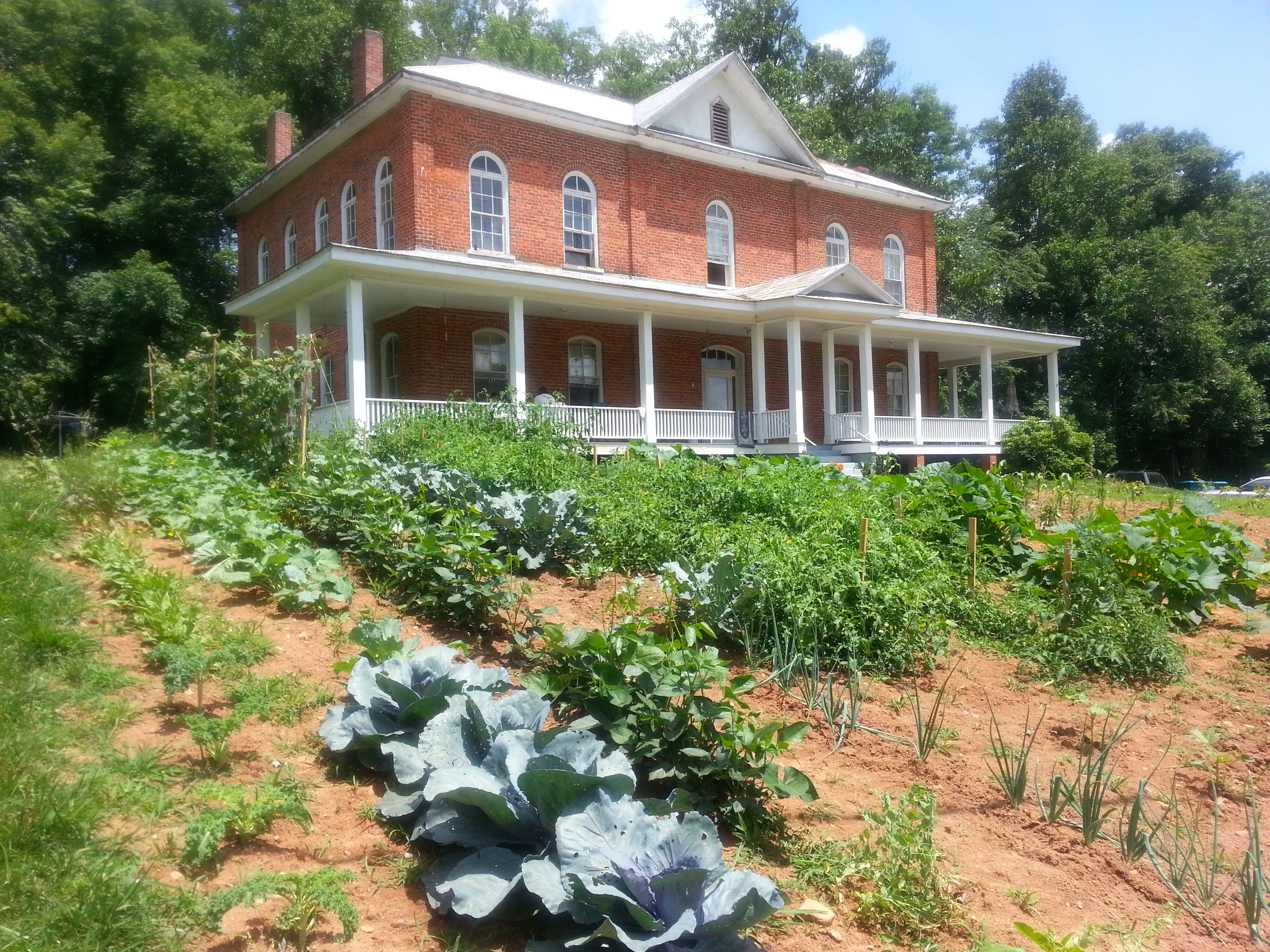
- campacademync.com

- Location within North Carolina Location within the United States
- Location: NC 63, near Leicester, North Carolina
- Coordinates: 35°39′22″N 82°42′52″W
- Area: 1.7 acres (0.69 ha)
- Built: 1897
- Architectural style: Colonial Revival, Vernacular Colonial Revival
- NRHP reference No.: 85002421
- Added to NRHP: September 19, 1985

Camp Academy, also known as Camp Forest, is a historic building located in Leicester, Buncombe County, North Carolina.

Built in 1896/7 with funds collected by the local Methodist Episcopal community, it stands on a low ridge on New Leicester Highway at the southeast edge of the former Turkey Creek Meeting Campground, a famous revival campground meeting site which existed from the late 1700s until 1893.

The 4800 sq. ft. two-story, five-bay, vernacular Colonial Revival-style brick building served the community as a private academy and teacher training institute from 1897 until 1913 when publicly funded education came to this section of Buncombe County. It later became an apartment house, and after 1983 a medical clinic. It operated as the Camp Forest hotel in the 1920s. It is the last remaining tuition academy building in the county.

It was listed on the National Register of Historic Places in 1985.
