= North Carolina Highway 212 =

State highway in Madison County, North Carolina, US

North Carolina Highway 212

Route information
- Maintained by NCDOT
- Length: 14.2 mi (22.9 km)
- Existed: 1926–present

Major junctions
- West end: NC 208 in Belva
- East end: SR 352 at the Tennessee state line near Flag Pond, TN

Location
- Country: United States
- State: North Carolina
- Counties: Madison

Highway system
- North Carolina Highway System; Interstate; US; State; Scenic
← NC 211	→ NC 213

North Carolina Highway 212 (NC 212) is a primary state highway in the U.S. state of North Carolina. The highway connects the White Rock community, through the Bald Mountains, in Madison County.

== Route description ==
NC 212 is a 14.2-mile (22.9 km) two-lane mountain highway that begins in the community of Belva at NC 208. Traveling in a northeasterly direction, it hugs along the banks of the Shelton Laurel Creek, arriving in the community of White Rock four miles (6.4 km) into the trip. Continuing on, it travels through the heart of the Pisgah National Forest, going between Limestone and Sugarloaf Mountains. At Devil Fork Gap (3,107 ft (947 m), highest point on route), it crosses both the Appalachian Trail and the Tennessee state line, continuing on as SR 352 towards Johnson City.

== History ==
NC 212 was established in 1926 as a new primary routing between NC 208 in Belva and Devil Fork Gap at the Tennessee state line. In 1981, NC 212 was truncated one-half mile (0.80 km) east of Big Creek Road (SR 1312); the downgraded section, which was still unpaved at the time, became SR 1434. In 1984, NCDOT reversed their decision and reinstated NC 212 to the Tennessee state line.

== Junction list ==
The entire route is in Madison County.

Location	mi	km	Destinations	Notes
Belva	0.0	0.0	NC 208 – Greeneville, Marshall, Asheville	
	14.2	22.9	SR 352 east – Johnson City	Tennessee state line
1.000 mi = 1.609 km; 1.000 km = 0.621 mi
