= Madison County Schools (North Carolina) =

School district in North Carolina, United States

Location
- Marshall, North Carolina United States of America
- Coordinates: 35.8154°N 82.6754°W

District information
- Type: Public
- Motto: Making It Happen!
- Grades: Birth through 12th
- Superintendent: Dr. Will Hoffman

Students and staff
- Students: 2,600

Other information
- Website: www.madisonk12.net

Madison County Public Schools is a public school district serving Madison County, North Carolina.

== History ==
In 2022 the sheriff announced that each school would have an AR-15 gun for protection against instances of school shootings. This is a joint project of the school district and the Madison County Sheriff's Office, and it was done in response to the Robb Elementary School shooting in Uvalde, Texas.

== Administration ==
=== Superintendent ===
Madison County Schools is led by Dr. Will Hoffman as superintendent.

=== Board of education ===
As of January 2019 the Board of Education consists of:

- Karen Blevins, Chairperson
- Kelby Cody, Vice Chairperson
- Kevin Barnette, Member
- Barbara Wyatt, Member
- Keith Ray, Member

== Facilities ==
=== Early childhood ===
- Marshall Center
- Mars Hill Center
- Madison High School Center

=== Primary education ===
- Brush Creek Elementary School
- Hot Springs Elementary School

(Laurel Elementary School was closed/merged into Hot Springs Elem.)

- Mars Hill Elementary School

=== Secondary education ===
- Madison Middle School
- Madison High School
- Madison Early College High School
