= Trust, North Carolina =

- Unincorporated community
- Location within North Carolina Location within the United States
- Coordinates: 35°45′09″N 82°52′12″W
- Country: United States
- State: North Carolina
- County: Madison County
- Elevation: 2,415 ft (736 m)
- Time zone: UTC-5 (Eastern (EST))
  - Summer (DST): UTC-4 (EDT)
- ZIP Code: 28743 (Hot Springs)
- Area code: 828
- GNIS feature ID: 1016245

Trust is an unincorporated community in Madison County, North Carolina, United States. Centered at the intersection of NC 63 and NC 209, the community spreads along the adjacent Spring and Friezeland creeks, north of Luck. The community is part of the Asheville Metropolitan Statistical Area.

The origin of the name "Trust" is obscure.
