= Luck, North Carolina =

- Unincorporated community
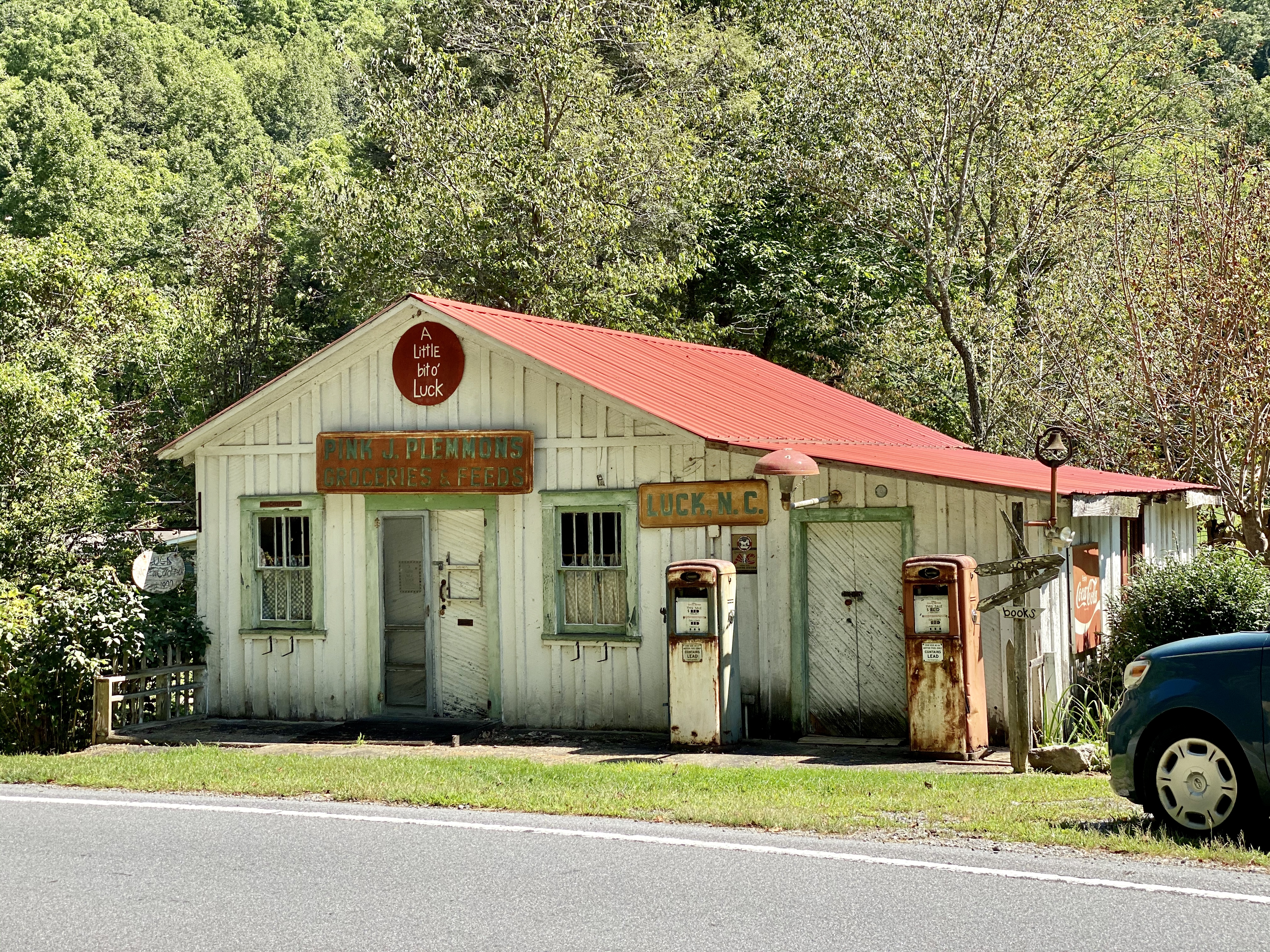
- Plemmons Grocery and Feed Store in Luck

- Location within North Carolina Location within the United States
- Coordinates: 35°44′09″N 82°51′59″W
- Country: United States
- State: North Carolina
- County: Madison
- Elevation: 2,560 ft (780 m)
- Time zone: UTC-5 (Eastern (EST))
  - Summer (DST): UTC-4 (EDT)
- ZIP Code: 28743 (Hot Springs)
- Area code: 828
- GNIS feature ID: 1021305

Luck is an unincorporated community in Madison County, North Carolina, United States, located on North Carolina Highway 209, south of Trust. It lies at an elevation of 2556 feet (779 m). The community is part of the Asheville Metropolitan Statistical Area.
