= Leicester, North Carolina =

Unincorporated community in North Carolina, US

Leicester (/ˈlɛstər/ LEST-ər) is an unincorporated community in Buncombe County, North Carolina, United States. Named for 19th-century merchant Leicester Chapman, it was incorporated as a town from 1859 to 1905. Reincorporation was proposed in 2007 and an incorporation bill was filed in the North Carolina General Assembly in 2011, but no measure has been adopted. Leicester is part of the Asheville Metropolitan Statistical Area.

Leicester Township, the surrounding county subdivision, had a population of 21,335 at the 2020 census.

== History ==
A post office began operating in the area, then called Turkey Creek, in April 1829. Around 1850, Leicester Chapman, a British-born merchant, moved to the area with his wife Sarah and opened a store. Chapman was postmaster of Turkey Creek from March 1, 1852, to October 30, 1856. In 1859, residents petitioned the North Carolina General Assembly to incorporate the community as a town named Leicester, after Chapman, and the new town held a celebration on July 4, 1859. The community was also home to Bascom College, a now-defunct school of which Chapman was a trustee. For decades the area was one of Buncombe County's most important agricultural sections. The town's charter was repealed in 1905.

Camp Academy was listed on the National Register of Historic Places in 1985. The two-story brick building was completed in 1897 as a private subscription school and housed the academy until 1913. A. C. Reynolds, a western North Carolina educator, was its first principal.

Residents began discussing reincorporation with Asheville City Council in 2007. In March 2011, a bill was filed in the North Carolina House of Representatives to incorporate the Town of Leicester, subject to a referendum.

== Education ==
Leicester's public schools are part of Buncombe County Schools. Leicester Elementary is the only school in the community. Clyde A. Erwin High School in Asheville draws students from Leicester.

== Geography ==
Leicester is located at 35°39′18″N 82°41′47″W, about 10 miles northwest of Asheville. The elevation of Leicester is roughly 2,100 ft. The ZIP Code for Leicester is 28748.
