= Walnut, North Carolina =

- Unincorporated community
- Location within North Carolina Location within the United States
- Coordinates: 35°50′58″N 82°44′20″W
- Country: United States
- State: North Carolina
- County: Madison County
- Elevation: 1,946 ft (593 m)
- Time zone: UTC-5 (Eastern (EST))
  - Summer (DST): UTC-4 (EDT)
- ZIP Code: 28753 (Marshall)
- Area code: 828
- GNIS feature ID: 1023108

Walnut in an unincorporated community in Madison County, North Carolina, United States. The community is named after the Walnut Mountains, located further north. Centered along Barnard Road (SR 1151), it is accessible via NC 213 and Walnut Drive (SR 1439), both connecting to nearby US 25/US 70 and northwest of Marshall. The community is part of the Asheville Metropolitan Statistical Area.
