= Madison County, North Carolina =

County in North Carolina, United States

- County
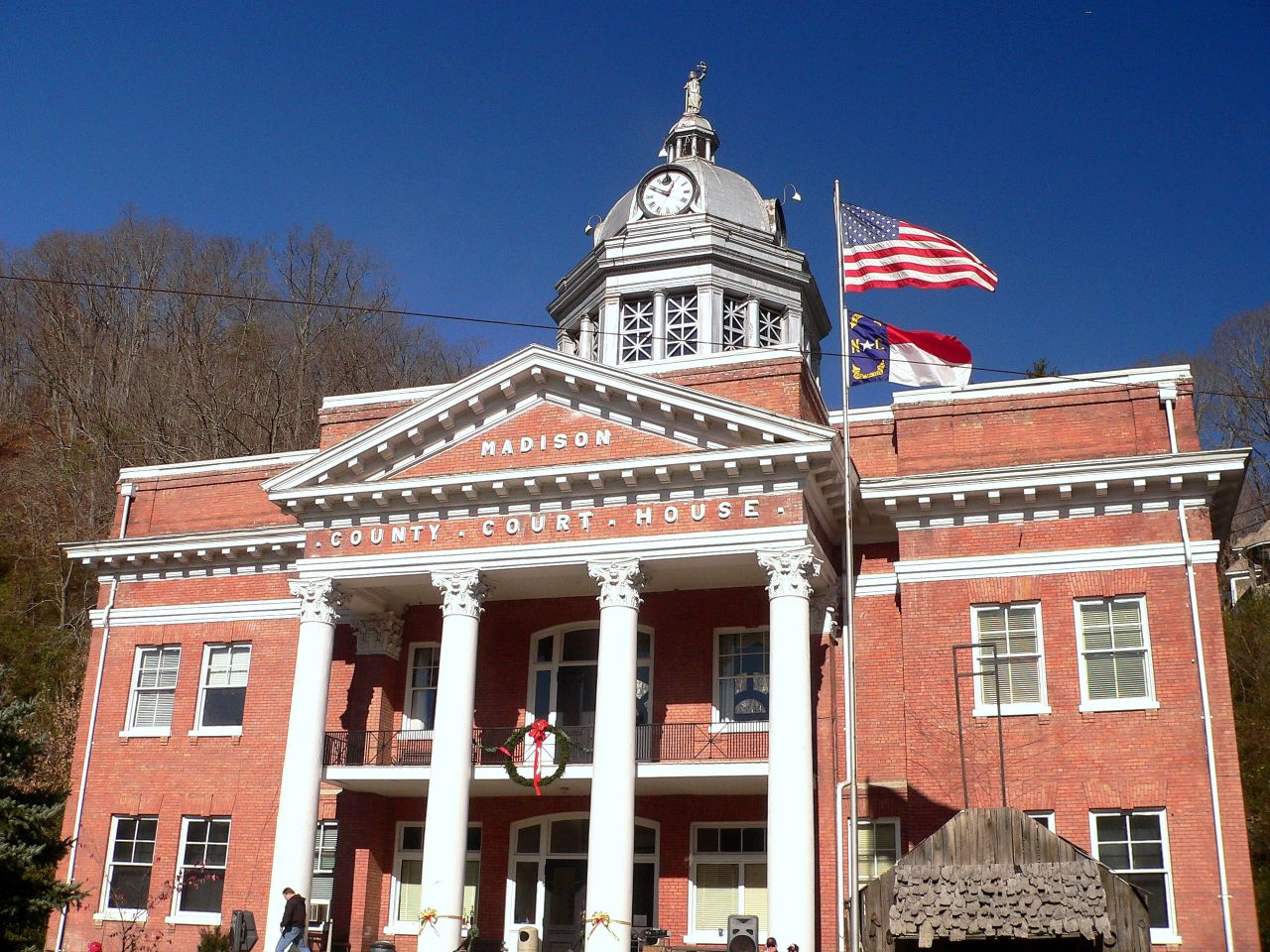
- Madison County Courthouse in Marshall

- Flag Seal

- Location within the U.S. state of North Carolina
- Interactive map of Madison County, North Carolina
- Coordinates: 35.86°N 82.71°W
- Country: United States
- State: North Carolina
- Founded: 1851
- Named for: James Madison
- Seat: Marshall
- Largest municipality: Mars Hill

Area
  - Total: 451.49 sq mi (1,169.4 km^{2})
  - Land: 449.62 sq mi (1,164.5 km^{2})
  - Water: 1.87 sq mi (4.8 km^{2}) 0.41%

Population (2020)
  - Total: 21,193
  - Estimate (2025): 22,553 ▲
  - Density: 47.135/sq mi (18.199/km^{2})
- Time zone: UTC−5 (Eastern)
  - Summer (DST): UTC−4 (EDT)
- Congressional district: 11th
- Website: www.madisoncountync.gov

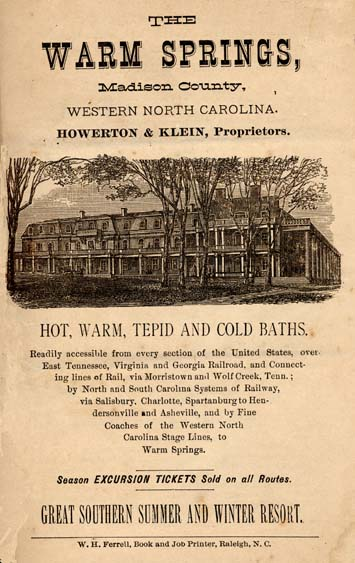
Advertisement for Warm Springs Hotel, Madison County, ca. 1880

Madison County is a county located in the U.S. state of North Carolina. As of the 2020 census, the population was 21,193. Its county seat is Marshall. Madison County is part of the Asheville, NC Metropolitan Statistical Area.

== History ==
The county was formed in 1851 from parts of Buncombe County and Yancey County. It was named for James Madison, fourth president of the United States (1809–1817).

The community of Long Ridge, outside of Mars Hill, is a traditionally African American community, and boasts one of the last remaining Rosenwald Schools in Western North Carolina.

== Geography ==
According to the U.S. Census Bureau, the county has a total area of 451.49 square miles (1,169.4 km^{2}), of which 449.62 square miles (1,164.5 km^{2}) is land and 1.87 square miles (4.8 km^{2}) (0.41%) is water.

Madison County is located deep in the Appalachian Mountains of western North Carolina, and much of the county's terrain is rugged, heavily forested, and sparsely populated. The county's northern border is with the State of Tennessee. Madison County's largest river is the French Broad River, which flows north-northwest through the county, first past the county seat of Marshall, then past the resort town of Hot Springs.

=== National Protected area ===
- Pisgah National Forest (part)

=== State and local protected areas ===
- Harmon Den Wildlife Management Area (part)
- Pisgah National Forest Game Land (part)
- Sandy Mush Game Land (part)

=== Major water bodies ===
- Big Laurel Creek
- French Broad River
- Gabriel Creek
- Ivy Creek
- Little Creek
- Little Laurel Creek
- Simmons Creek
- Whiteoak Creek

=== Adjacent counties ===
- Greene County, Tennessee – north
- Unicoi County, Tennessee – northeast
- Yancey County – east
- Buncombe County – south
- Haywood County – southwest
- Cocke County, Tennessee – northwest

=== Major highways ===
- I-26
- US 19
- US 23
- US 23A
- US 25
- US 25 Bus.
- US 70
- US 70 Bus.
- NC 63
- NC 208
- NC 209
- NC 212
- NC 213
- NC 251

== Demographics ==
Historical population
Census	Pop.	Note	%±
1860	5,908		—
1870	8,192		38.7%
1880	12,810		56.4%
1890	17,805		39.0%
1900	20,644		15.9%
1910	20,132		−2.5%
1920	20,083		−0.2%
1930	20,306		1.1%
1940	22,522		10.9%
1950	20,522		−8.9%
1960	17,217		−16.1%
1970	16,003		−7.1%
1980	16,827		5.1%
1990	16,953		0.7%
2000	19,635		15.8%
2010	20,764		5.7%
2020	21,193		2.1%
2025 (est.)	22,553	▲	6.4%
U.S. Decennial Census; 1790–1960 1900–1990; 1990–2000 2010 2020

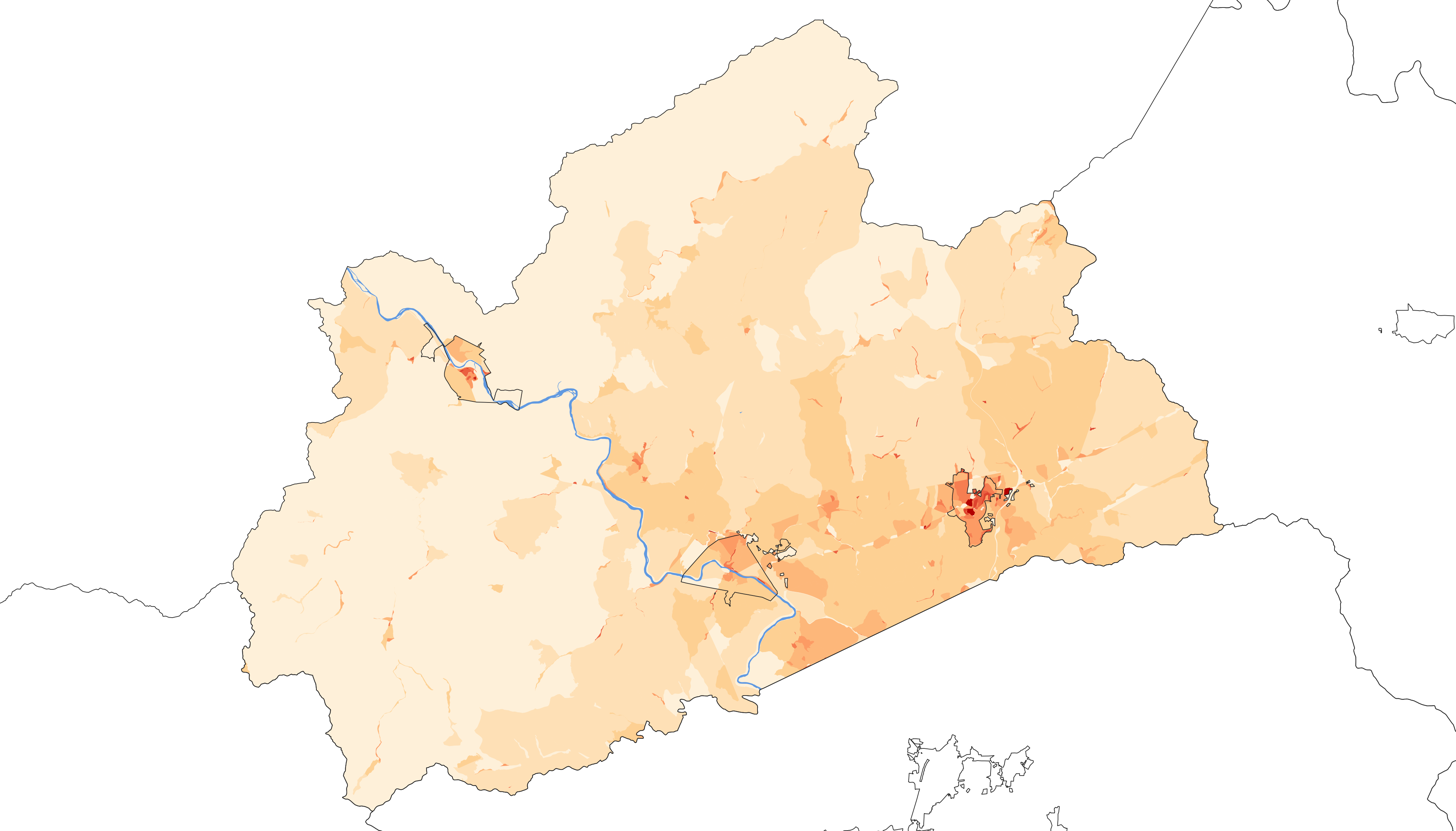
2020 population density of Madison County NC by census block

=== Racial and ethnic composition ===
Madison County, North Carolina – Racial and ethnic composition Note: the US Census treats Hispanic/Latino as an ethnic category. This table excludes Latinos from the racial categories and assigns them to a separate category. Hispanics/Latinos may be of any race.
Race / Ethnicity (NH = Non-Hispanic)	Pop 1980	Pop 1990	Pop 2000	Pop 2010	Pop 2020	% 1980	% 1990	% 2000	% 2010	% 2020
White alone (NH)	16,567	16,684	19,004	19,734	19,233	98.45%	98.41%	96.79%	95.04%	90.75%
Black or African American alone (NH)	135	135	160	233	197	0.80%	0.80%	0.81%	1.12%	0.93%
Native American or Alaska Native alone (NH)	37	17	50	43	56	0.22%	0.10%	0.25%	0.21%	0.26%
Asian alone (NH)	6	29	43	70	84	0.04%	0.17%	0.22%	0.34%	0.40%
Native Hawaiian or Pacific Islander alone (NH)	x	x	1	8	1	x	x	0.01%	0.04%	0.00%
Other race alone (NH)	0	2	0	17	73	0.00%	0.01%	0.00%	0.08%	0.34%
Mixed race or Multiracial (NH)	x	x	111	236	801	x	x	0.57%	1.14%	3.78%
Hispanic or Latino (any race)	82	86	266	423	748	0.49%	0.51%	1.35%	2.04%	3.53%
Total	16,827	16,953	19,635	20,764	21,193	100.00%	100.00%	100.00%	100.00%	100.00%

=== 2020 census ===
As of the 2020 census, the county had a population of 21,193, with 8,920 households and 5,456 families residing in the county.

The median age was 45.9 years; 17.5% of residents were under the age of 18 and 23.5% were 65 years of age or older. For every 100 females there were 97.1 males, and for every 100 females age 18 and over there were 95.2 males age 18 and over.

The racial makeup of the county was 91.4% White, 1.0% Black or African American, 0.3% American Indian and Alaska Native, 0.4% Asian, <0.1% Native Hawaiian and Pacific Islander, 1.5% from some other race, and 5.3% from two or more races. Hispanic or Latino residents of any race comprised 3.5% of the population.

<0.1% of residents lived in urban areas, while 100.0% lived in rural areas.

There were 8,920 households in the county, of which 24.1% had children under the age of 18 living in them. Of all households, 49.6% were married-couple households, 18.3% were households with a male householder and no spouse or partner present, and 25.3% were households with a female householder and no spouse or partner present. About 29.8% of all households were made up of individuals and 14.7% had someone living alone who was 65 years of age or older.

There were 11,045 housing units, of which 19.2% were vacant. Among occupied housing units, 76.8% were owner-occupied and 23.2% were renter-occupied. The homeowner vacancy rate was 1.6% and the rental vacancy rate was 8.1%.

=== 2000 census ===
At the 2000 census, there were 19,635 people, 8,000 households, and 5,592 families residing in the county. The population density was 44 people per square mile (17 people/km^{2}). There were 9,722 housing units at an average density of 22 units per square mile (8.5 units/km^{2}). The racial makeup of the county was 97.63% White, 0.83% Black or African American, 0.27% Native American, 0.23% Asian, 0.01% Pacific Islander, 0.45% from other races, and 0.59% from two or more races. 1.35% of the population were Hispanic or Latino of any race.

There were 8,000 households, out of which 28.40% had children under the age of 18 living with them, 57.50% were married couples living together, 8.90% had a female householder with no husband present, and 30.10% were non-families. 26.30% of all households were made up of individuals, and 11.80% had someone living alone who was 65 years of age or older. The average household size was 2.34 and the average family size was 2.81.

In the county, the population was spread out, with 21.20% under the age of 18, 10.30% from 18 to 24, 26.50% from 25 to 44, 26.00% from 45 to 64, and 15.90% who were 65 years of age or older. The median age was 39 years. For every 100 females there were 97.30 males. For every 100 females age 18 and over, there were 93.30 males.

The median income for a household in the county was $30,985, and the median income for a family was $37,383. Males had a median income of $27,950 versus $22,678 for females. The per capita income for the county was $16,076. About 10.90% of families and 15.40% of the population were below the poverty line, including 17.60% of those under age 18 and 19.20% of those age 65 or over.

== Law, government, and politics ==
=== Government ===
Madison County is governed by a five-member Board of Commissioners who are elected every two years with staggered four year terms as proscribed by North Carolina state law. The Board selects its own chairman and holds scheduled meetings on the second Monday of each month. Madison County is a member of the Land-of-Sky Regional Council of governments.

=== Law and policing ===
The Madison County Sheriff's Office protects the court, manages the jail, protects county owned facilities, and provides patrol and detective services for the unincorporated areas of the county. The towns of Mars Hill, Hot Springs, and Marshall have municipal police departments.

=== Politics ===
In Madison County, Republicans dominate by wide margins in national and state elections, though Democrats remain competitive in county and municipal elections.

United States presidential election results for Madison County, North Carolina
Year	Republican		Democratic		Third party(ies)	
Year	No.	%	No.	%	No.	%
1912	430	16.24%	897	33.89%	1,320	49.87%
1916	1,965	66.91%	972	33.09%	0	0.00%
1920	3,616	72.96%	1,340	27.04%	0	0.00%
1924	3,252	67.79%	1,471	30.66%	74	1.54%
1928	4,776	81.38%	1,093	18.62%	0	0.00%
1932	4,552	61.76%	2,769	37.57%	49	0.66%
1936	5,099	61.94%	3,133	38.06%	0	0.00%
1940	4,617	59.28%	3,171	40.72%	0	0.00%
1944	4,388	65.70%	2,291	34.30%	0	0.00%
1948	3,341	55.73%	2,558	42.67%	96	1.60%
1952	4,751	56.45%	3,666	43.55%	0	0.00%
1956	4,263	53.58%	3,693	46.42%	0	0.00%
1960	4,422	49.31%	4,546	50.69%	0	0.00%
1964	3,336	46.56%	3,829	53.44%	0	0.00%
1968	3,130	49.18%	2,201	34.58%	1,034	16.25%
1972	3,273	61.18%	2,039	38.11%	38	0.71%
1976	2,446	41.49%	3,433	58.24%	16	0.27%
1980	2,629	44.02%	3,202	53.62%	141	2.36%
1984	3,666	54.81%	2,988	44.67%	35	0.52%
1988	3,453	53.07%	3,033	46.62%	20	0.31%
1992	3,121	39.07%	3,980	49.82%	888	11.12%
1996	3,110	44.24%	3,333	47.41%	587	8.35%
2000	4,676	56.17%	3,505	42.10%	144	1.73%
2004	5,175	54.69%	4,234	44.74%	54	0.57%
2008	5,192	50.02%	5,026	48.42%	161	1.55%
2012	5,404	53.44%	4,484	44.34%	225	2.22%
2016	6,783	60.19%	3,926	34.84%	560	4.97%
2020	7,979	61.02%	4,901	37.48%	196	1.50%
2024	8,275	60.75%	5,090	37.37%	256	1.88%

== Education ==
Madison County Schools consists of one early college high school, one traditional high school (Madison High School, located in the county seat of Marshall), one middle school (Madison Middle School), and three elementary schools (Brush Creek Elementary, Hot Springs Elementary, and Mars Hill Elementary). Brush Creek Elementary was built as a merger of Marshall Elementary and Walnut Elementary after the latter burned down in 1998.

The county is also home to Mars Hill University, a private, coed, four-year liberal-arts university. Founded in 1856, Mars Hill is the oldest college or university in western North Carolina. The university offers 34 majors and seven degrees: Bachelor of Arts, Bachelor of Science, Bachelor of Science in Nursing (BSN), Bachelor of Music, Bachelor of Fine Arts, Bachelor of Social Work, and Master of Education.

== Culture ==
Madison County was historically a center for old-time folk music. Among others, the folk song Rain and Snow likely originated there, in the late 19th century.

== Communities ==
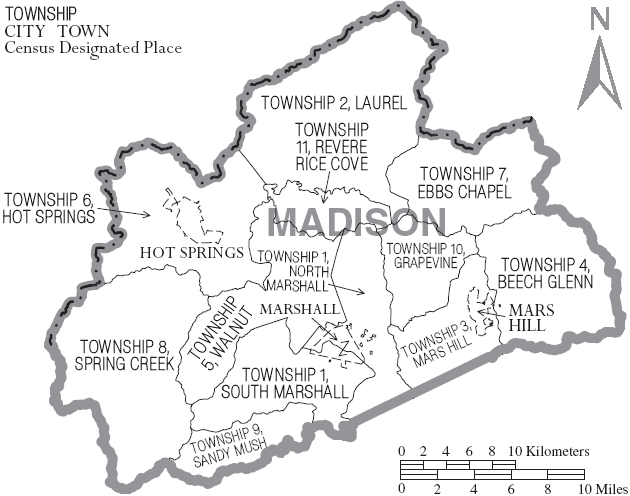
Map of Madison County with municipal and township labels

=== Towns ===
- Hot Springs
- Mars Hill (largest municipality)
- Marshall (county seat)

=== Townships ===
The county is divided into eleven townships that are both numbered and named:

- Township 1, Marshall
- Township 2, Laurel
- Township 3, Mars Hill
- Township 4, Beech Glenn
- Township 5, Walnut
- Township 6, Hot Springs
- Township 7, Ebbs Chapel
- Township 8, Spring Creek
- Township 9, Sandy Mush
- Township 10, Grapevine
- Township 11, Revere Rice

Formerly there were sixteen townships, which were both numbered and named:

- Township 1, Marshall
- Township 2, Shelton Laurel
- Township 3, Bull Creek
- Township 4, Middle Fork of Ivy
- Township 5, West Fork of Ivy
- Township 6, Sandy Mush
- Township 7, Little Pine Creek
- Township 8, Spring Creek
- Township 9, Hot Springs
- Township 10, Big Laurel
- Township 11, Upper Laurel
- Township 12, Big Pine Creek
- Township 13, Meadow Fork of Spring Creek
- Township 14, Grapevine
- Township 15, Mars Hill
- Township 16, Foster Creek

=== Unincorporated communities ===
- Barnard
- Faust
- Hurricane
- Joe
- Luck
- Paint Rock
- Petersburg
- Revere
- Spring Creek
- Trust
- Walnut
- White Rock

== Notable people ==
- Claude DeBruhl, North Carolina House of Representatives

== See also ==
- List of counties in North Carolina
- National Register of Historic Places listings in Madison County, North Carolina
