= Asheville metropolitan area =

Metropolitan area in North Carolina, United States

Coordinates: 35°36′02″N 82°40′58″W

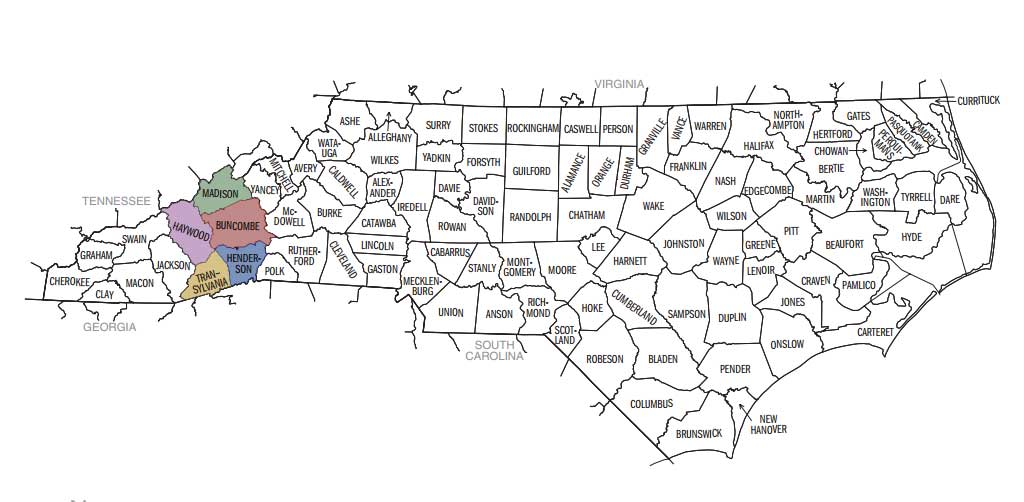
Detailed map of NC counties with names. Colored are the counties of Buncombe, Haywood, Henderson, Madison, and Transylvania.

The Asheville metropolitan area is a metropolitan area centered on the principal city of Asheville, North Carolina. The U.S. Office of Management and Budget defines the Asheville, NC Metropolitan Statistical Area, a metropolitan statistical area used by the United States Census Bureau and other entities, as comprising the three counties of Buncombe, Henderson, and Madison. The area's population was 406,926 according to the 2020 census.

== Counties ==
County	Seat	2025 estimate	2020 census	Change	Area	Density
Buncombe	Asheville	277,417	269,452	+2.96%	660 sq mi (1,700 km^{2})	420/sq mi (162/km^{2})
Henderson	Hendersonville	122,375	116,281	+5.24%	375 sq mi (970 km^{2})	326/sq mi (126/km^{2})
Madison	Marshall	22,553	21,193	+6.42%	451 sq mi (1,170 km^{2})	50/sq mi (19/km^{2})
Total		422,345	406,926	+3.79%	1,486 sq mi (3,850 km^{2})	284/sq mi (110/km^{2})

== Communities ==
=== Places with more than 75,000 inhabitants ===
- Asheville (principal city)

=== Places with 5,000 to 75,000 inhabitants ===
- Black Mountain
- Brevard
- East Flat Rock
- Etowah
- Fletcher
- Hendersonville
- Mills River
- Swannanoa
- Waynesville
- Woodfin

=== Places with 2,500 to 4,999 inhabitants ===
- Canton
- Flat Rock
- Lake Junaluska
- Weaverville

=== Places with 1,000 to 2,499 inhabitants ===
- Avery Creek
- Balfour
- Barker Heights
- Bent Creek
- Biltmore Forest
- Clyde
- Fairview
- Laurel Park
- Maggie Valley
- Mars Hill
- Mountain Home
- Valley Hill
- West Canton

=== Places with fewer than 1,000 inhabitants ===
- Hot Springs
- Marshall
- Montreat
- Rosman
- Saluda (partial)

=== Unincorporated places ===
- Arden
- Barnardsville
- Bat Cave
- Breakaway
- Candler
- Chesnut Hill
- Gerton
- Horse Shoe
- Joe
- Jupiter
- Leicester
- Luck
- Petersburg
- Pisgah Forest
- Ridgecrest
- Skyland
- Trust
- Walnut

== Demographics ==
As of the census of 2000, there were 369,171 people, 154,290 households, and 103,653 families residing within the MSA. The racial makeup of the MSA was 91.49% White, 5.15% African American, 0.37% Native American, 0.56% Asian, 0.03% Pacific Islander, 1.33% from other races, and 1.06% from two or more races. Hispanic or Latino of any race were 3.15% of the population.

The median income for a household in the MSA was $34,921, and the median income for a family was $41,952. Males had a median income of $30,308 versus $23,069 for females. The per capita income for the MSA was $19,031.

== Combined statistical area ==
The Asheville–Waynesville–Brevard, NC Combined Statistical Area is made up of five counties in western North Carolina. The statistical area includes the Asheville metropolitan area and the micropolitan areas of Waynesville and Brevard, North Carolina.

Statistical Area	2025 estimate	2020 Census	Change	Area	Density
Asheville, NC Metropolitan Statistical Area	422,345	406,926	+3.79%	1,486 sq mi (3,850 km^{2})	284/sq mi (110/km^{2})
Waynesville, NC Micropolitan Statistical Area	63,369	62,089	+2.06%	555 sq mi (1,440 km^{2})	114/sq mi (44/km^{2})
Brevard, NC Micropolitan Statistical Area	34,211	32,986	+3.71%	380 sq mi (980 km^{2})	90/sq mi (35/km^{2})
Total	519,925	502,001	+3.57%	2,421 sq mi (6,270 km^{2})	215/sq mi (83/km^{2})

== See also ==
- North Carolina statistical areas
- List of cities, towns, and villages in North Carolina
- List of unincorporated communities in North Carolina
