= Hot Springs, North Carolina =

- Town
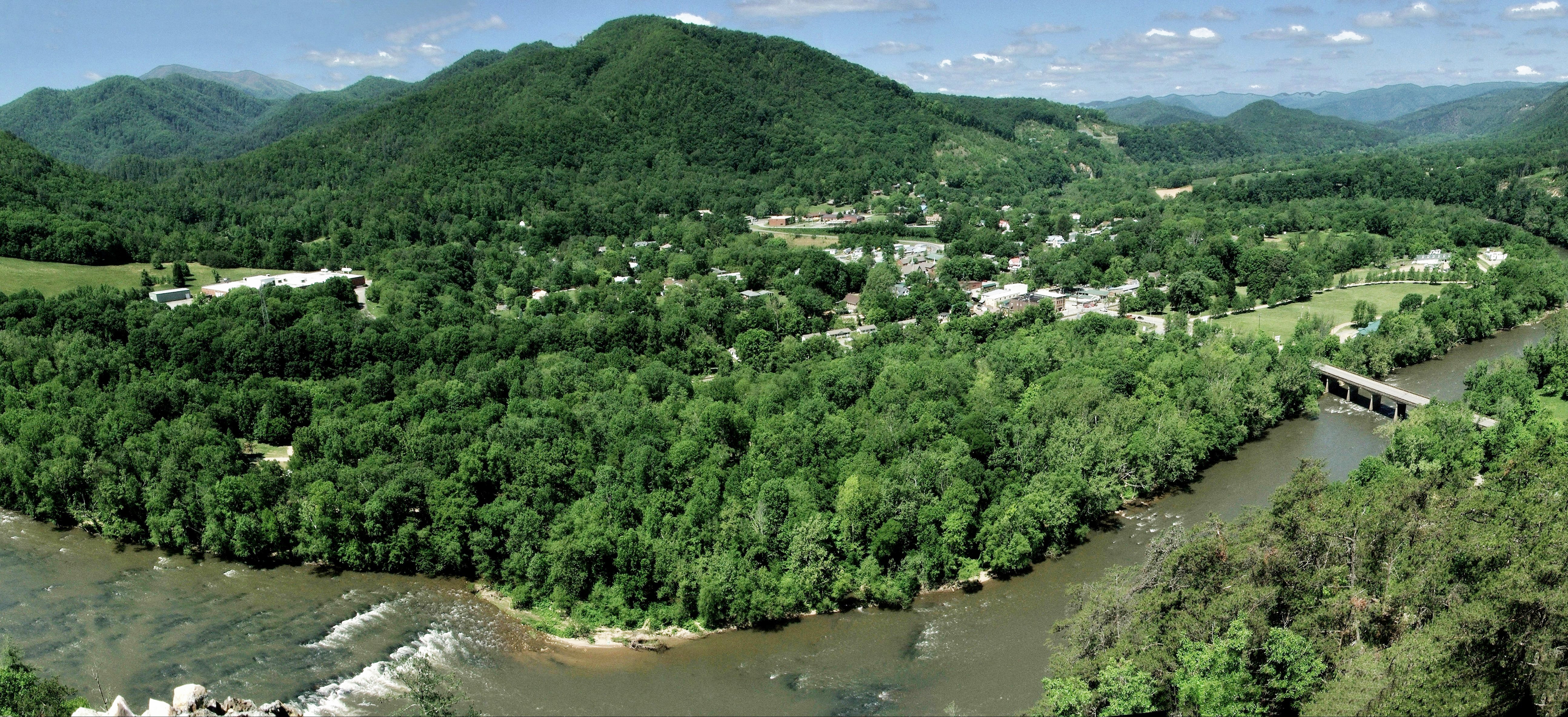
- Hot Springs and the French Broad River, as seen from the Appalachian Trail

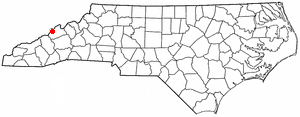
- Location of Hot Springs, North Carolina
- Coordinates: 35°53′36″N 82°49′49″W
- Country: United States
- State: North Carolina
- County: Madison
- Discovered: 1778
- Founded: 1800
- Incorporated: 1889
- Named after: Thermal springs in area

Area
  - Total: 3.14 sq mi (8.12 km^{2})
  - Land: 2.87 sq mi (7.43 km^{2})
  - Water: 0.27 sq mi (0.69 km^{2})
- Elevation: 1,378 ft (420 m)

Population (2020)
  - Total: 520
  - Density: 181.4/sq mi (70.03/km^{2})
- Time zone: UTC-5 (Eastern (EST))
  - Summer (DST): UTC-4 (EDT)
- ZIP code: 28743
- Area code: 828
- FIPS code: 37-32840
- GNIS feature ID: 2405868
- Website: hotspringsnc.org

Hot Springs is a town in Madison County, North Carolina, United States. The population was 520 at the 2020 census. It is part of the Asheville metropolitan statistical area. It is situated on the Appalachian Trail and French Broad River near the North Carolina-Tennessee border. Hot Springs is best known for its hiking trails, natural springs, and mountain town atmosphere.

== History ==
Hot Springs is located at the confluence of the French Broad River and Spring Creek. A natural thermal spring is located there, the only hot spring known in North Carolina and in much of the southeastern United States. Thus, this area has long been a destination for those looking for therapeutic relief from their ailments. Native Americans were the first to discover and use the 108 °F (42 °C) mineral waters, and European immigrants settled the area over 200 years ago. It is reported that people were visiting the springs by 1778 for the waters' reported healing properties.

It was believed Jasper Dagy was the first owner of Warm Springs, as it was then called, and he sold it to William Neilson in 1791. Neilson built an inn, and Philip Hoodenpile built an estate and a ferry across the French Broad, as well as the toll road Jewel Hill Road. In 1828, a major road was constructed through the town, the Buncombe Turnpike, making the area more accessible.

By 1831, James Patton of Asheville bought the springs and had erected 350 room Warm Springs Hotel with its 13 tall columns representing the Thirteen Colonies in 1837. The dining room of this large hotel could seat 600 people. The railroad reached the village in 1882. The hotel burned in 1884 after 46 years of operation. Another hotel, called the Mountain Park, was built in 1886.

A higher temperature spring was found, prompting the changing of the town's name from Warm Springs to Hot Springs in 1886. Sixteen marble pools were surrounded by landscaped lawns with croquet and tennis courts, and it was known as one of the most lavish resorts in the Southeast. By May 1917, the hotel and grounds were leased to the US Government to be used as an internment camp. Many German and Austro-Hungarian internees, noncombatant aliens, made local friends and stayed in the region after World War I. That hotel burned in 1920, and two more were built—neither as large and opulent, and both later burned as well.

Hot Springs and the historic district was devastated by flooding caused by Hurricane Helene on September 27, 2024.

== Geography ==
According to the United States Census Bureau, the town has a total area of 3.5 square miles (9.1 km^{2}), of which 3.2 square miles (8.3 km^{2}) is land and 0.3 square miles (0.78 km^{2}) (8.96%) is water.

== Climate ==
Climate data for Hot Springs, North Carolina, 1991–2020 normals, extremes 1984–present
Month	Jan	Feb	Mar	Apr	May	Jun	Jul	Aug	Sep	Oct	Nov	Dec	Year
Record high °F (°C)	80 (27)	85 (29)	88 (31)	92 (33)	96 (36)	102 (39)	104 (40)	100 (38)	98 (37)	95 (35)	86 (30)	79 (26)	104 (40)
Mean maximum °F (°C)	68.1 (20.1)	72.1 (22.3)	78.9 (26.1)	86.0 (30.0)	88.3 (31.3)	92.4 (33.6)	93.7 (34.3)	92.9 (33.8)	91.5 (33.1)	84.9 (29.4)	77.2 (25.1)	70.2 (21.2)	95.2 (35.1)
Mean daily maximum °F (°C)	48.3 (9.1)	52.3 (11.3)	60.4 (15.8)	70.5 (21.4)	77.9 (25.5)	84.3 (29.1)	87.2 (30.7)	86.4 (30.2)	81.9 (27.7)	71.6 (22.0)	60.4 (15.8)	51.5 (10.8)	69.4 (20.8)
Daily mean °F (°C)	38.4 (3.6)	41.6 (5.3)	48.6 (9.2)	57.4 (14.1)	65.7 (18.7)	72.9 (22.7)	76.3 (24.6)	75.5 (24.2)	70.3 (21.3)	59.3 (15.2)	48.4 (9.1)	41.5 (5.3)	58.0 (14.4)
Mean daily minimum °F (°C)	28.5 (−1.9)	30.8 (−0.7)	36.7 (2.6)	44.2 (6.8)	53.5 (11.9)	61.5 (16.4)	65.4 (18.6)	64.5 (18.1)	58.8 (14.9)	46.9 (8.3)	36.3 (2.4)	31.6 (−0.2)	46.6 (8.1)
Mean minimum °F (°C)	10.4 (−12.0)	15.9 (−8.9)	21.3 (−5.9)	28.9 (−1.7)	38.6 (3.7)	50.6 (10.3)	58.0 (14.4)	56.9 (13.8)	45.8 (7.7)	30.9 (−0.6)	21.4 (−5.9)	16.6 (−8.6)	8.1 (−13.3)
Record low °F (°C)	−1 (−18)	−2 (−19)	11 (−12)	20 (−7)	32 (0)	35 (2)	48 (9)	45 (7)	37 (3)	25 (−4)	13 (−11)	2 (−17)	−2 (−19)
Average precipitation inches (mm)	3.66 (93)	3.34 (85)	3.99 (101)	3.83 (97)	4.50 (114)	5.22 (133)	4.67 (119)	4.93 (125)	3.35 (85)	2.40 (61)	2.86 (73)	3.91 (99)	46.66 (1,185)
Average snowfall inches (cm)	1.6 (4.1)	2.6 (6.6)	0.5 (1.3)	0.0 (0.0)	0.0 (0.0)	0.0 (0.0)	0.0 (0.0)	0.0 (0.0)	0.0 (0.0)	0.0 (0.0)	0.2 (0.51)	1.2 (3.0)	6.1 (15.51)
Average precipitation days (≥ 0.01 in)	12.1	12.2	12.6	11.1	12.3	12.9	12.6	10.9	8.8	8.0	9.1	11.6	134.2
Average snowy days (≥ 0.1 in)	2.1	1.5	0.7	0.0	0.0	0.0	0.0	0.0	0.0	0.0	0.2	1.0	5.5
Source: NOAA

== Demographics ==
Historical population
Census	Pop.	Note	%±
1890	695		—
1900	445		−36.0%
1910	443		−0.4%
1920	495		11.7%
1930	637		28.7%
1940	773		21.4%
1950	721		−6.7%
1960	723		0.3%
1970	653		−9.7%
1980	678		3.8%
1990	478		−29.5%
2000	645		34.9%
2010	560		−13.2%
2020	520		−7.1%
U.S. Decennial Census

=== 2020 census ===
Hot Springs racial composition
Race	Number	Percentage
White (non-Hispanic)	460	88.46%
Native American	1	0.19%
Asian	2	0.38%
Other/Mixed	48	9.23%
Hispanic or Latino	9	1.73%

As of the 2020 United States census, there were 520 people, 223 households, and 143 families residing in the town.

== Economy ==
Today, the hot mineral springs are privately owned by a spa and private lodging rental businesses. Water is piped to outdoor tubs beside the river and Spring Creek. The town is a tourist destination, with the springs as well as abundant outdoor recreation. The Appalachian Trail runs along downtown's Bridge Street and climbs the mountains on either side of the river. Rafting and kayaking is popular on the French Broad River. There are numerous other hiking, mountain biking, backpacking, and sightseeing opportunities in the nearby Pisgah National Forest.

== Hot Springs Historic District ==
Hot Springs Historic District was listed on the National Register of Historic Places in 2009. Also listed on the National Register of Historic Places are Dorland Memorial Presbyterian Church, the Henry Ottinger House, and Sunnybank.

== Gallery ==
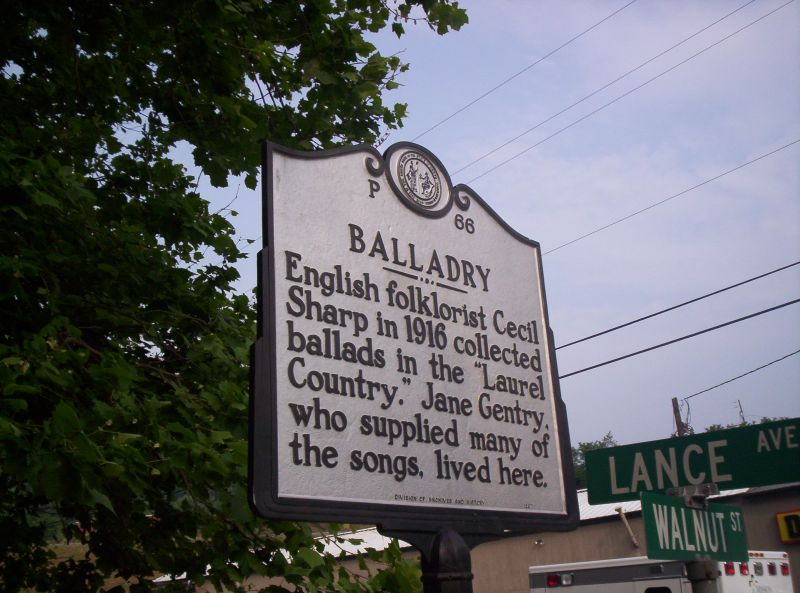
A sign outside of The Sunnybank Inn marks where Cecil Sharp collected ballads in 1916.

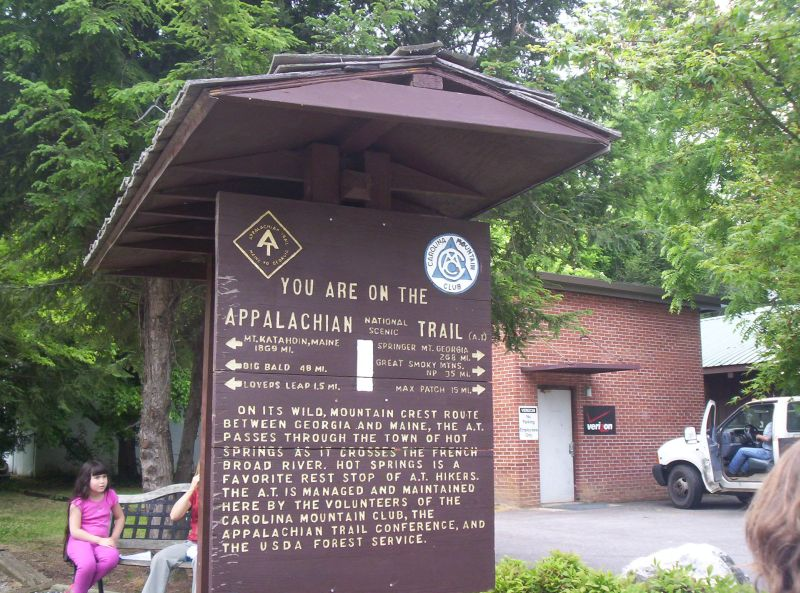
Appalachian Trail sign

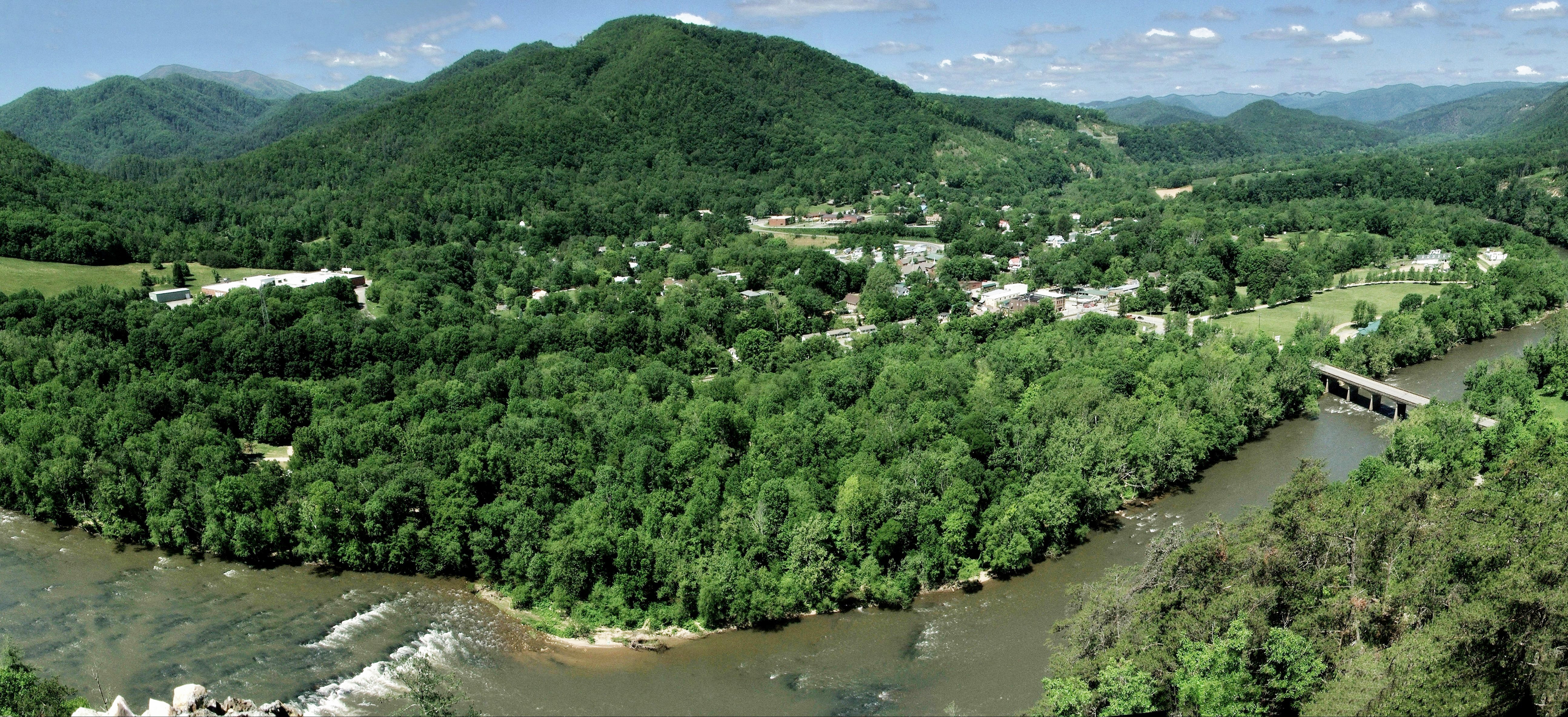
View from Lover's Leap Trail

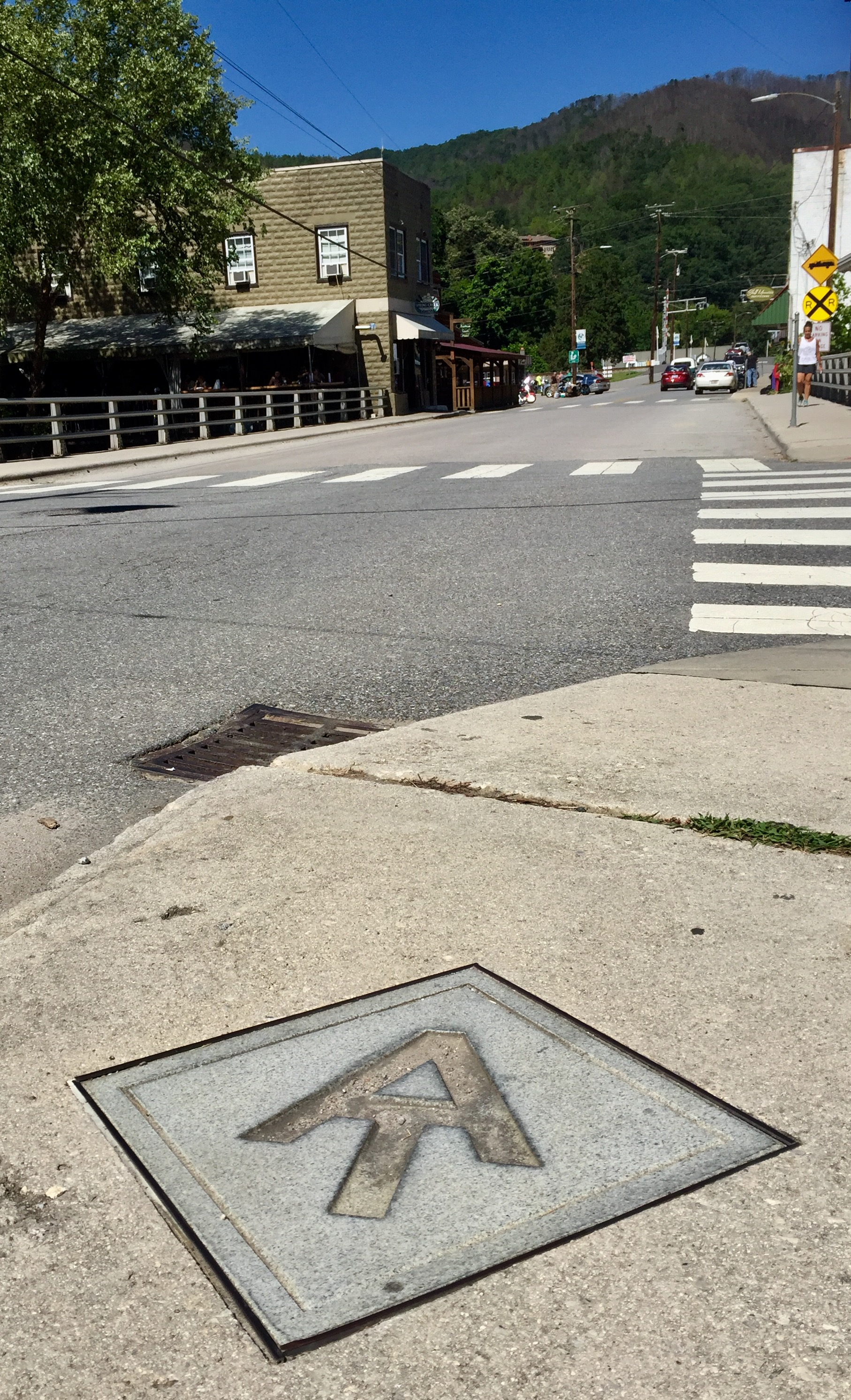
Appalachian Trail marker embedded in sidewalk

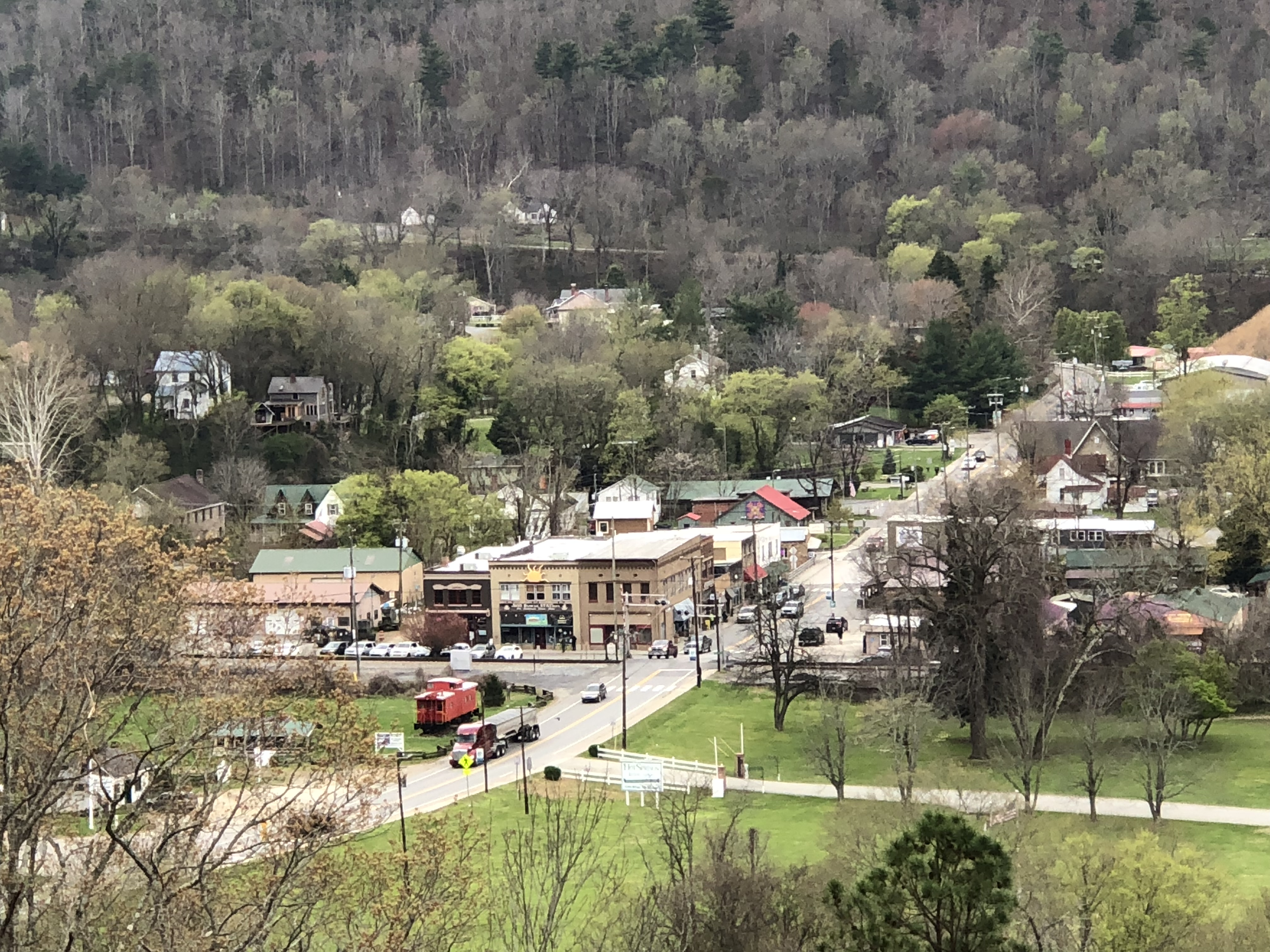
View of downtown

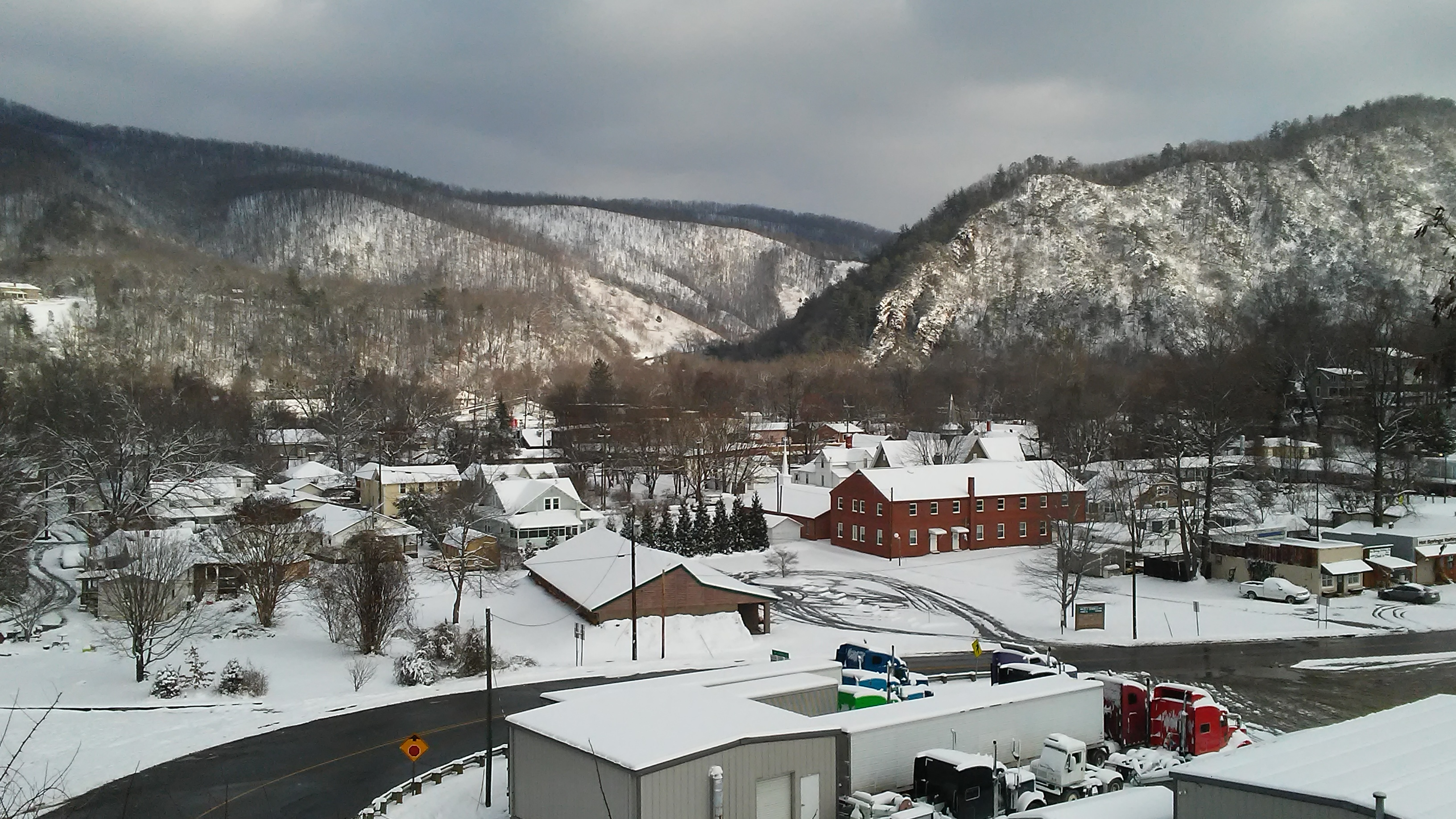
View of Hot Springs and Lover's Leap Ridge

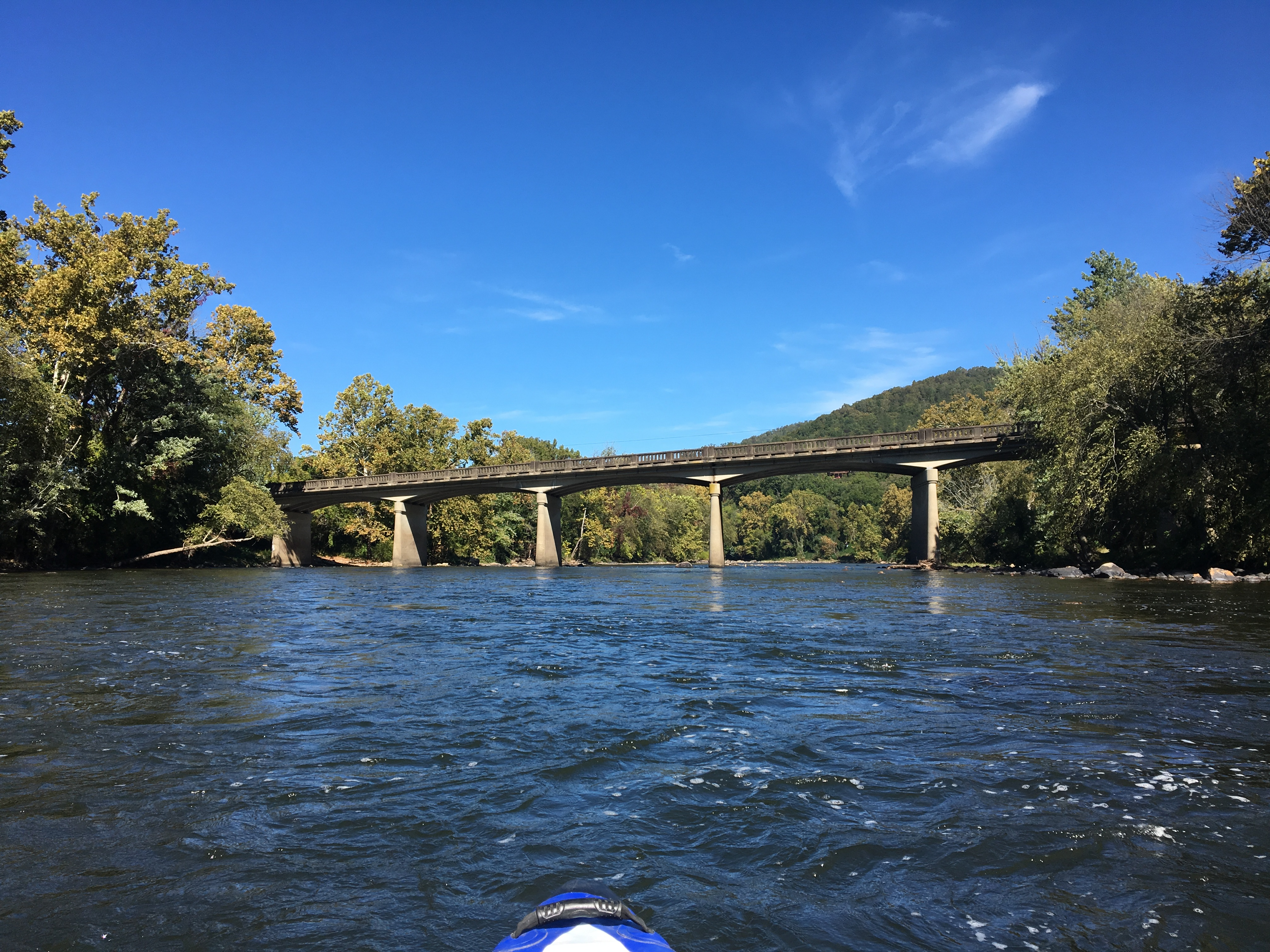
French Broad River bridge

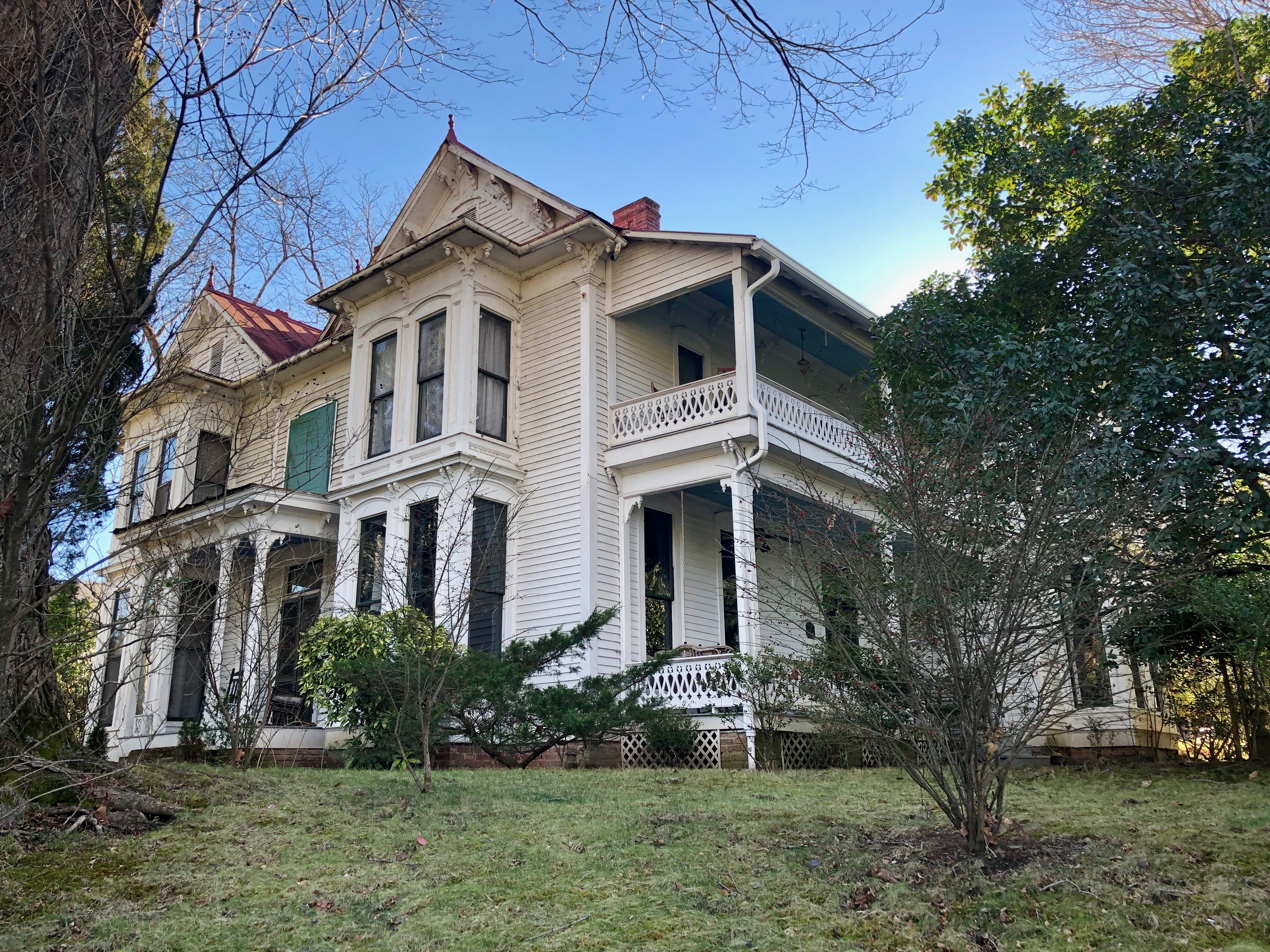
Historic Sunnybank

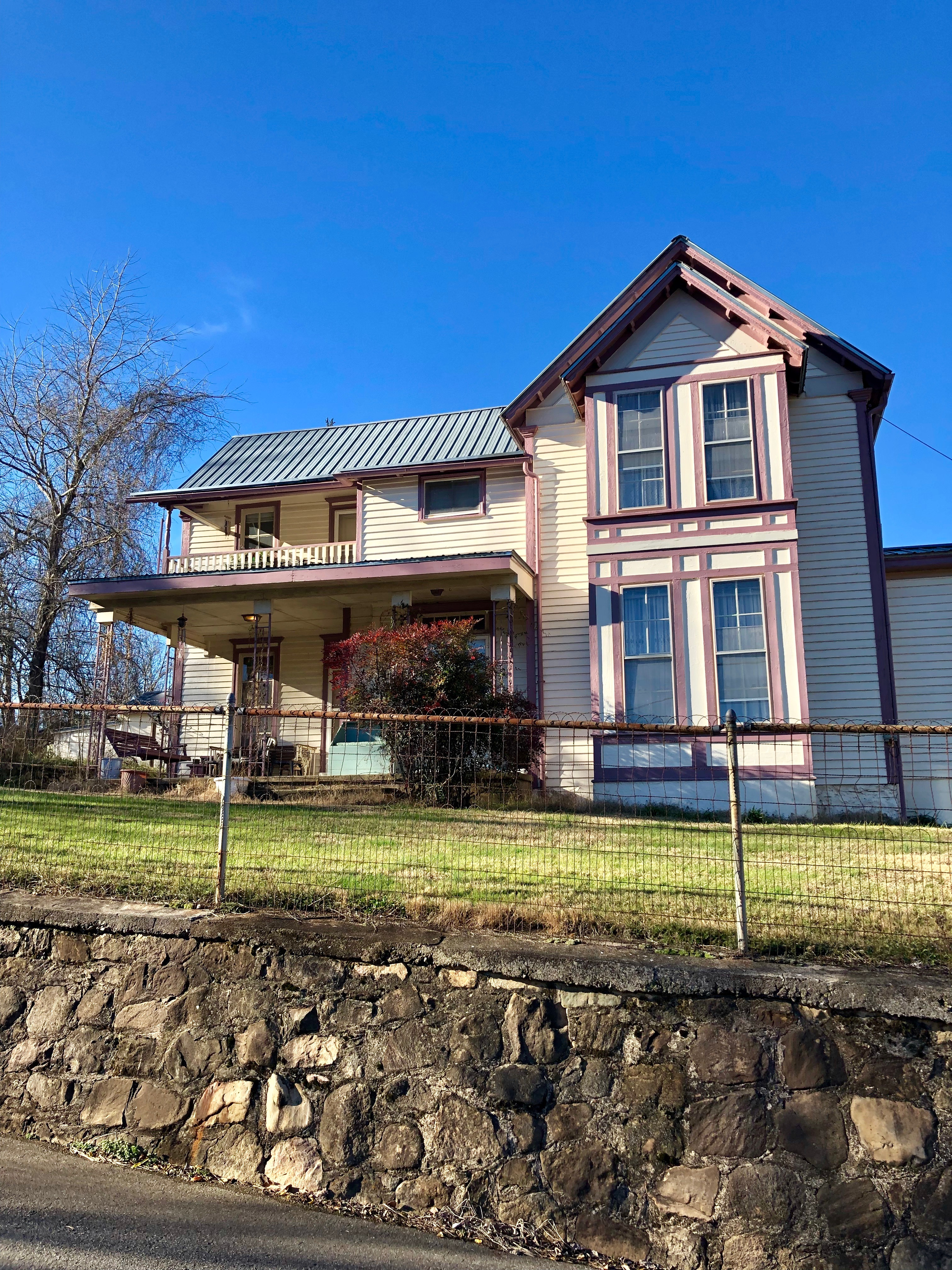
Historic Home on Lawson Street

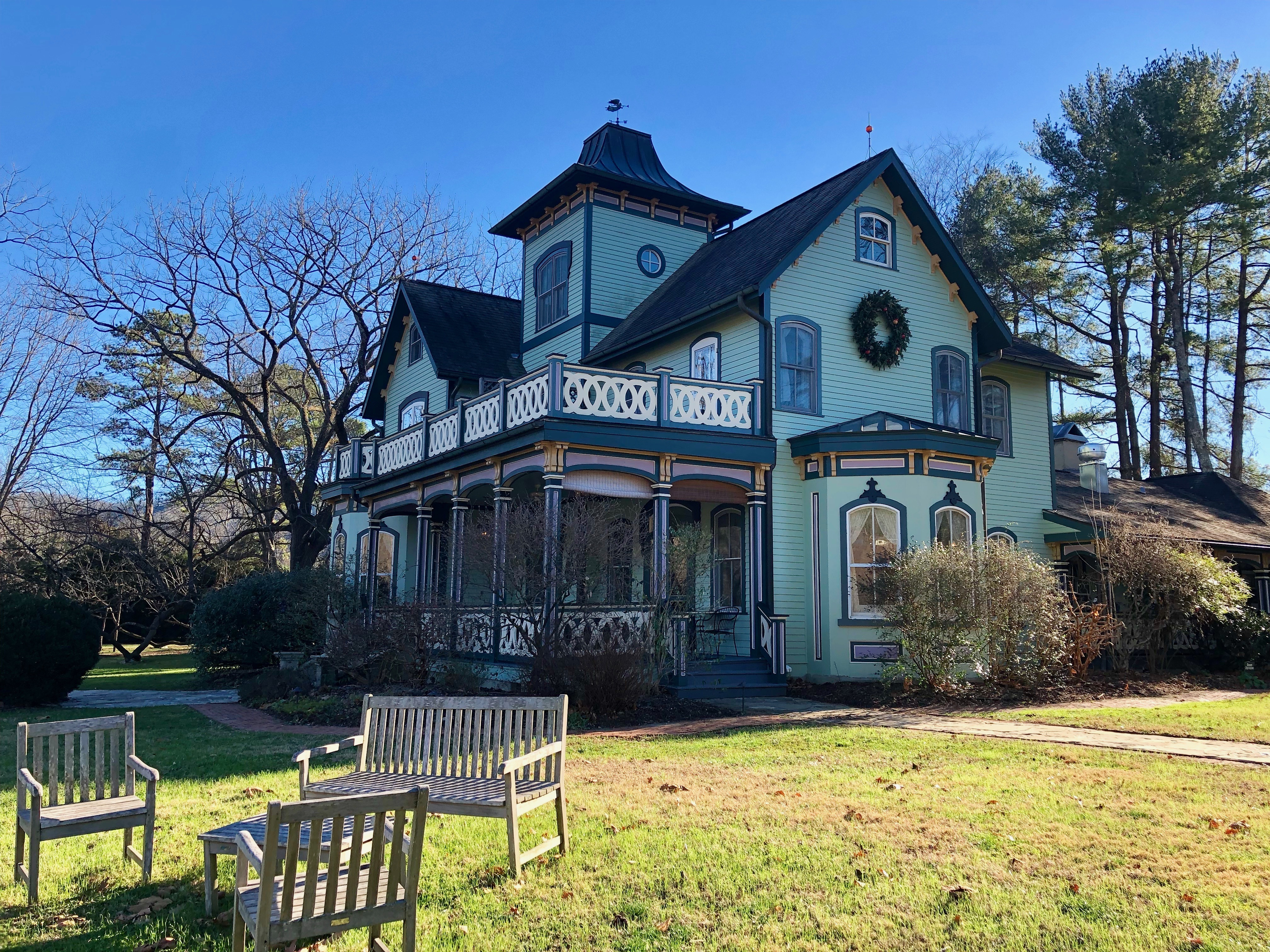
Mountain Magnolia Inn

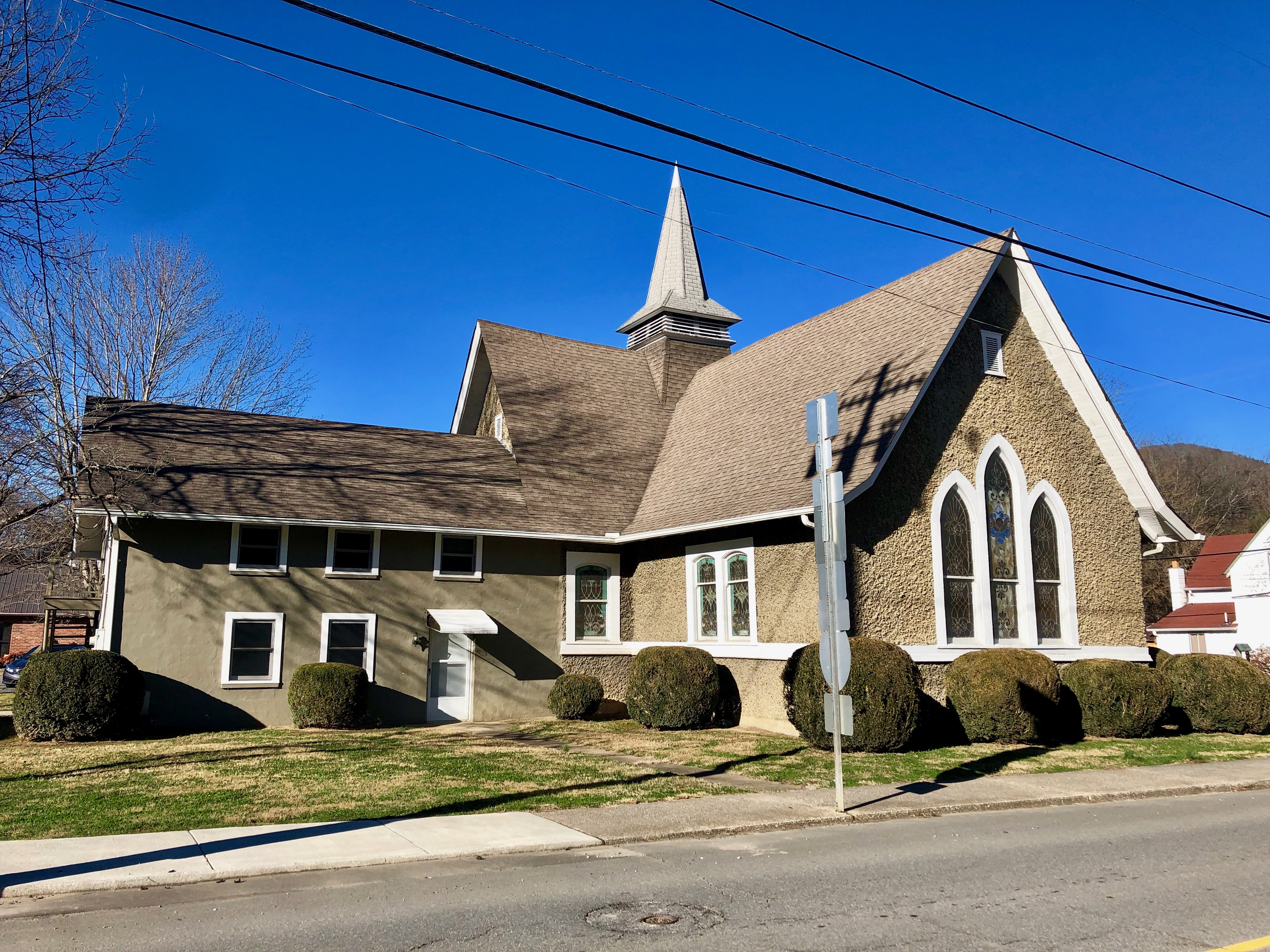
Dorland Memorial Presbyterian Church

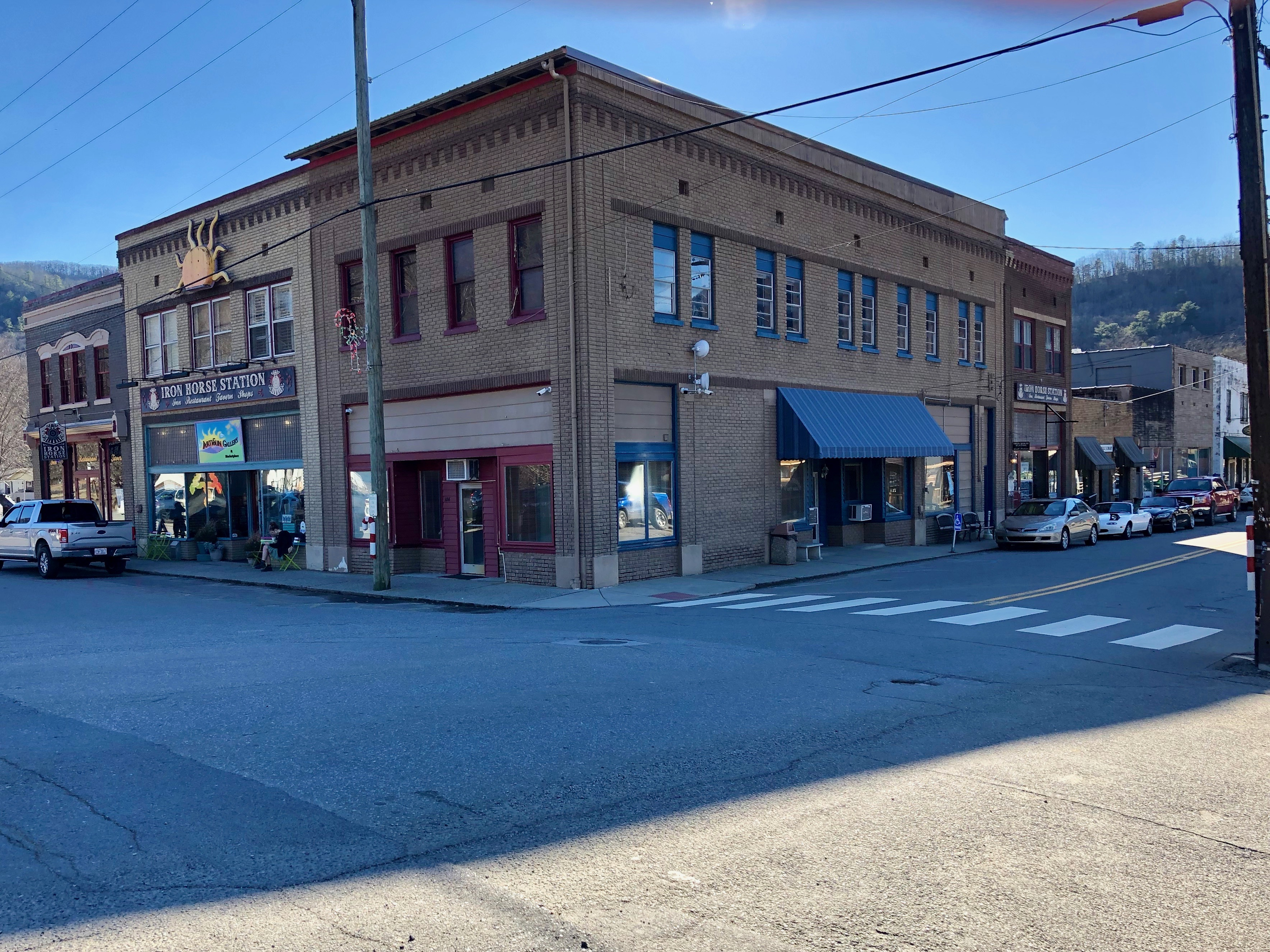
Downtown Hot Springs
