= Murray =

Murray may refer to:

== Businesses ==
- Murray (bicycle company), an American bicycle manufacturer
- Murray Motor Car Company, an American car manufacturer
- Murrays, an Australian bus company
- Murray International Trust, a Scottish investment trust
- D. & W. Murray Limited, an Australian wholesale drapery business
- John Murray (publishing house), a British publishing house

== Fictional characters ==
- Murray Monster, a muppet in Sesame Street
- Little Murray Sparkles, a cat in Sesame Street
- Murray (Monkey Island), a character in the video game series
- Murray (Sly Cooper), a character in the video game series
- Murray Slaughter, a regular character in The Mary Tyler Moore Show
- Murray, the mascot of the band Dio
- Murray, in the 2015 Netflix series Richie Rich
- Murray, a Hotel Transylvania character
- Murray the Cop, in Fat Pizza
- Murray Smith, in Swift and Shift Couriers
- Mrs Murray the teacher from Little Bill.
- Jessie Brewer, a nurse in General Hospital

== People ==
- Murray (surname)
- Murray (given name)

== Places ==
=== Australia ===
- Division of Murray, federal electoral district in Victoria
- Electoral district of The Murray, an electoral district in the Australian colony of Victoria from 1856 to 1877
- Murray, Queensland
- Murray Island, Queensland
- Murray River, a major river in the south-east
- Murray River (Western Australia)
- Murrays Road, Logan City, Queensland
- Murray Street, Perth, Western Australia
- Shire of Murray, Western Australia

=== United States ===
- Murray, Connecticut
- Murray, Idaho
- Murray, Indiana
- Murray, Iowa
- Murray, Kentucky
  - Murray State University, located in this city
  - Murray State Racers, the school's athletic program
- Murray, Nebraska
- Murray, New York
- Murray, Utah, the largest city with the name in the United States
- Murray, West Virginia
- Murray Isle, in the Thousand Islands region of New York
- Murray Lake (Michigan)

=== Elsewhere or multi-national ===
- Murray County (disambiguation)
- Murray Island (disambiguation)
- Lake Murray (disambiguation)
- Murray Lake (Manitoba), Canada
- The Murray Marsh, Ontario, Canada
- Murray River (disambiguation)
- Murray Township (disambiguation)
- Murray Monolith, Mac.Robertson Land, Antarctica
- Murray Channel, between Navarino and Hoste Islands in Chile
- The Murray, East Kilbride, Scotland, a residential area of East Kilbride
- The Murray, Hong Kong, a hotel in Hong Kong, formerly government building Murray Building

== Ships ==
- HMS Murray, two Royal Navy ships
- USS Murray, three US Navy ships
- The Murray (clipper ship), an English clipper ship launched in 1861

== Other uses ==
- Murray High School (disambiguation)
- Murray cod, a freshwater fish in Australia
- Murray polygon, a type of space-filling curve

== See also ==
- Murray Hill (disambiguation)
- Murray House (disambiguation)
- Murray Park (disambiguation)
- Murray Town (disambiguation)
- McMurray (disambiguation)
- Moray (disambiguation)
- Murry (disambiguation)
