= Murray House (disambiguation) =

Murray House is a commercial building in Hong Kong.

Murray House may also refer to:

- Russey-Murray House, Howard County, Arkansas, formerly listed on the National Register of Historic Places (NRHP)
- Jonathan Murray House, Madison, Connecticut
- Thomas Murray House (Davenport, Iowa)
- Richards-Murray House, Glendale, Kentucky, listed on the NRHP
- William Murray House, Salem, Massachusetts
- Robert Murray House, Waltham, Massachusetts
- James H. Murray House, Linden, Michigan, listed on the NRHP
- John L. Murray House, Lloyd Murray House, and William Murray House, part of the Murray's Mill Historic District, Catawba County, North Carolina
- Thomas J. Murray House, Mars Hill, North Carolina
- Long, McCorkle and Murray Houses, Newton, North Carolina
- Thomas Murray House (Clearfield, Pennsylvania)
- McCollum-Murray House, Greeleyville, South Carolina
- George Murray House (Park City, Utah), listed on the NRHP
- Thomas Murray House (Virginia Beach, Virginia)
- James F. Murray House, Chester, West Virginia
- George Murray House (Racine, Wisconsin)

== See also ==
- Pauli Murray Family Home
