= Thomas Murray House =

Thomas Murray House may refer to:

- Thomas Murray House (Davenport, Iowa), listed on the National Register of Historic Places listings in Scott County, Iowa
- Thomas J. Murray House, Mars Hill, North Carolina, listed on the National Register of Historic Places in North Carolina
- Thomas Murray House (Clearfield, Pennsylvania), listed on the National Register of Historic Places in Clearfield County, Pennsylvania
- Thomas Murray House (Virginia Beach, Virginia), listed on the NRHP in Virginia
