= Murray (given name) =

Murray is an English masculine given name, originally derived from the Scottish and Irish surname Murray. Notable people with the name include:

== Arts and entertainment ==
=== Acting ===
- F. Murray Abraham (born 1939), American actor
- Murray Alper (1904–1984), American actor
- Murray Bartlett (born 1971), Australian actor
- Murray Hamilton (1923–1986), American actor
- Murray Head (born 1946), English singer and actor
- Murray Cruchley, Canadian actor and radio personality active 1979–1995
- Murray Langston (born 1944), Canadian/American actor and comedian known as The Unknown Comic

=== Music ===
- Murray Adaskin (1906–2002), Canadian violinist, composer, conductor and teacher
- Murray C. Anderson, South African composer, recording engineer and producer
- Murray Attaway (born 1957), American musician
- Murray Bernthal (1911–2010), American musician and producer
- Murray Boren (born 1950), American composer
- Murray Cook (born 1960), Australian vocalist, songwriter and guitarist with The Wiggles
- Murray Gold (born 1969), English composer, known for composing music for Doctor Who
- Murray Grand (1919–2007), American musician
- Murray Head (born 1946), English singer and actor
- Murray Kaufman a.k.a. Murray the K (1922–1982), American disc jockey
- Murray Perahia (born 1947), American conductor and pianist
- Murray Cutter (1902–1983), French-American orchestrator

=== Other arts and entertainment ===
- Murray Ball (1939–2017), New Zealand cartoonist
- Murray Lerner (1927–2017), American documentary filmmaker
- Murray SawChuck (born 1973), magician on America's Got Talent (season 5) and magic expert for Pawn Stars
- Murray Smith (writer) (1940–2003), British TV writer and producer
- Murray Chercover (1929–2010), Canadian television producer and executive
- Murray Cohl (1929–2008), Canadian film producer
- Murray (escapologist), born Norman Murray Walters (1901–1988), Australian escapologist

== Business ==
- Murray M. Baker (1872–1964), American businessman
- Murray Lender (1930–2012), American businessman

== Education ==
- J. Murray Beck (1914–2011), Canadian historian and professor
- Murray Bowen (1913–1990), American psychiatrist and professor
- Murray Brown (born 1936), Economics professor
- Murray Barnson Emeneau (1904–2005), American linguistics professor
- Murray Greene (1920–1995), American philosophy professor
- Murray S Smith, British professor of film studies and philosopher at the University of Kent
- Murray A. Straus (1926–2016), American professor of sociology
- Murray C. Wells (born 1936), New Zealand economist and professor
- Murray Clarke, Canadian Philosophy professor

== Politics ==
- Murray Biggar, Canadian politician in office 1895
- Murray Bourchier (1881–1937), Australian soldier and politician
- Murray Bourchier (diplomat) (1925–1981), Australian public servant and diplomat
- Murray Byrne (1928–2012), Australian politician
- Murray Calder (born 1951), Canadian politician
- Murray Gaunt (1935–2009), Canadian politician, 1962–1981
- Murray McBride (born 1935), Canadian politician and author
- Murray McCully (born 1953), New Zealand politician
- Murray Schwartz (Queens politician) (1919–2001), American politician
- Murray Smith (Alberta politician), Canadian lawyer and politician, 1993–2004
- Murray Smith (Canadian politician) (1930–2010), MP for Winnipeg North, 1958–1962
- Murray Smith (New Zealand politician), in office 2002–2005
- Murray Robert Smith (1941–2009), New Zealand Labour Party politician & MP
- Robert Murray Smith (1831–1921), known as Murray Smith, politician in colonial Victoria, Australia
- Murray Cardiff (1934–2013), Canadian MP in office 1980–1993
- Murray Chotiner (1909–1974), American political strategist, attorney, and government official
- Murray Clark (1899–1973), Canadian parliament member in office 1935–1957
- Murray Coell (born 1955 or 1954), Canadian politician in office 1996–2013
- Murray Cowper (born 1960), Australian politician in office 2005–2017
- Murray Criddle (born 1943), Australian politician in office 1993–2008
- Murray Van Wagoner (1898–1986), American politician from Michigan

== Science and medicine ==
- Murray Banks (1917–2008), American psychologist
- Murray Barr (1908–1995), Canadian physician and medical researcher
- Murray Batchelor (born 1961), Australian mathematical physicist
- Murray Bornstein (1917–1995), American neuroscientist
- Murray Bowen (1913–1990), American psychiatrist and professor
- Murray Brennan (born 1940), New Zealand surgeon, oncologist, cancer researcher, and academic
- Ian Brooker (1934–2016), Australian botanist
- Murray Campbell, Canadian computer scientist involved with IBM Deep Blue
- Murray Feingold (1930–2015), American pediatrician and geneticist, founder of the National Birth Defects Center (now Feingold Center for Children)
- Murray Gell-Mann (1929–2019), Nobel prize–winning theoretical physicist
- Murray Goldberg (born 1962), Canadian eLearning pioneer
- Murray Heimberg American medical scientist

== Sports ==
=== Association football ===
- Murray Archibald (1917–2006), Scottish footballer
- Murray Barnes (1954–2011), Australian soccer player
- Murray Brodie (born 1950), Scottish footballer

=== Cricket ===
- Murray Bennett (born 1956), Australian cricketer
- Murray Bisset (1876–1931), South African cricketer
- Murray Brown (umpire) (born 1966), South African cricket umpire
- Murray Chapple (1930–1985), New Zealand cricketer
- Murray Child (born 1953), New Zealand cricketer
- Murray Commins (born 1997), South African cricketer
- Murray Creed (born 1979), South African cricketer active 1997–2002

=== Ice hockey ===
- Murray Anderson (ice hockey) (born 1949), Canadian player
- Murray Armstrong (1916–2010), Canadian player and coach
- Murray Balagus (born 1929), Canadian player
- Murray Balfour (1936–1965), American player
- Murray Bannerman (born 1957), Canadian player
- Murray Baron (born 1967), Canadian player
- Murray Brumwell (born 1960), Canadian player
- Murray McIntosh (born 1967), Canadian player
- Murray Costello (born 1934), Canadian player, executive, administrator, and builder
- Murray Craven (born 1964), Canadian centre

=== Other sports ===
- Murray Anderson (field hockey) (born 1968), South African field hockey player
- Murray Arnold (1938–2012), American basketball coach
- Murray Ashby (1931–1990), New Zealand rower
- Murray Bedel, Canadian para–alpine skier at the 1984 Winter Paralympics
- Murray Browne (born 1963), Australian rules football player
- Murray Buchan (born 1991), Scottish freestyle skier
- Murray Burdan (born 1975), New Zealand swimmer
- Murray Buswell (born 1962), English swimmer
- Murray Carter (born 1931), Australian racing driver
- Murray Cheater (1947–2020), New Zealand hammer thrower
- Murray Chessell (born 1944), Australian lawyer and gymnast
- Murray Clapham (1939–2011), Australian rules footballer
- Murray Cockburn (born 1933), Canadian sprinter
- Murray Cook (baseball) (born 1940), Canadian scout and general manager
- Murray Couper (born 1948), Australian rules football player
- Murray Craig, Scottish rugby union player active in the 1990s and 2000s
- Murray Deaker, New Zealand sports broadcaster
- Murray Mexted (born 1953), New Zealand rugby union player
- Murray Walker (1923–2021), English motorsport commentator and pundit

== Writing ==
- Murray Bail (born 1941), Australian author
- Murray Bishoff, American writer active in the late 20th century
- Murray Boltinoff (1911–1994), American writer and editor of comic books
- Murray Cammick, New Zealand journalist, photographer and record label founder active since the 1970s
- Murray Campbell (columnist) (born 1950), Canadian columnist
- Murray Chass (born 1938), American sports writer
- Murray Kempton (1917–1997), American journalist
- Murray Leinster (1896–1975), American author
- Murray McBride (born 1935), Canadian politician and author
- Murray Rothbard (1926–1995), American economist, individualist anarchist, and author
- Murray Sayle (1926–2010), Australian journalist

== Other ==
- Murray Adams-Acton (1886–1971), English historian and interior designer
- Murray Angus, Canadian First Nations activist
- Murray Arbeid (1935–2011), British fashion designer
- Murray Beauclerk, 14th Duke of St Albans (born 1939)
- Murray Bookchin (1921–2006), American political theorist, creator of the theory of social ecology
- Murray Chandler (born 1960), New Zealand chess grandmaster
- Murray Chatlain (born 1963), Canadian clergyman
- Murray Cotterill (1913–1995), Canadian trade union activist
- Murray Coutts-Trotter (1874–1929), British barrister and Chief Justice of the Madras High Court
- Murray Gerstenhaber (1927–2024), American mathematician and lawyer
- Murray A. Hansen, American military officer
- Murray Beresford Roberts (1919–1974), Australian–New Zealand confidence trickster and thief
- Murray Merle Schwartz (1931–2013), American federal judge from Delaware
- Murray J. Shubin (1917–1956), American World War II flying ace
- Murray A. Wiener (1909–????), American explorer and photographer
- Murray W. Miller, American Teamsters official

== See also ==
- Murray (disambiguation)
- Murray (surname)
