= McMurry =

McMurry is a surname. Notable people with the surname include:

- Chris McMurry (born 1965), American racing driver
- Frank Morton McMurry (1862–1936), American educator
- John E. McMurry, whose name is given to the McMurry reaction
- Lillian McMurry (1921–1999), American record producer
- Matt McMurry (born 1997), American racing driver
- Michelle McMurry-Heath, American immunologist

== See also ==
- McMurray (disambiguation)
- McMurry University in Abilene, Texas
- The McMurry reaction, in which two carbonyls are coupled to give a single alkene
