= Murray City =

Murray is the name of several cities:

== United States ==
- Murray City, Ohio
- Murray, Indiana
- Murray, Iowa
- Murray, Kentucky
- Murray, New York
- Murray, Utah

== See also ==
- Murray Hill (disambiguation)
- Murray Town (disambiguation)
