= Murray station =

Murray station may refer to:

== Transportation ==
- Murray Bridge railway station, a railway station in Murray Bridge, South Australia
- Murray Central station, a light rail and commuter rail station in Murray, Utah, United States
- Murray North station, a light rail station in Murray, Utah, United States
- Mount Murray railway station, a former railway station in New South Wales, Australia

== Power generation ==
- Murray Hydroelectric Power Station, two generating stations near the Khancoban, New South Wales, Australia
- Sidney A. Murray Jr. Hydroelectric Station, near Vidalia, Louisiana, United States

== See also ==
- Murray Hill station
- Murray (disambiguation)
