= McMurray =

McMurray or MacMurray may refer to:

- McMurray (surname)
- McMurray, Pennsylvania
- Fort McMurray, urban service area in Alberta, Canada
- Lake McMurray, Washington
- McMurray Formation, stratigraphical unit
- McMurray test, physical examination of the knee
- McMurray House (disambiguation), various listed buildings in the United States
- MacMurray College

== See also ==
- McMurry
- Murray (disambiguation)
