= William McMurray =

William McMurray may refer to:

- William McMurray, founder of Fort McMurray, Canada
- William McMurray (engineer) (1929–2006), pioneer in the field of power electronics
- William McMurray (politician) (c. 1813–1868), from New York
- William McMurray (priest) (1810–1894), 19th century Canadian Anglican bishop
- William McMurray (American football), 1900–1906 Wyoming Cowboys football coach
- Bill McMurray (born 1943), Scottish footballer
- Will McMurray (1882–1945), African-American baseball catcher
