= Hotel Hurst =

Historic building in Maquoketa, Iowa, US

- U.S. National Register of Historic Places
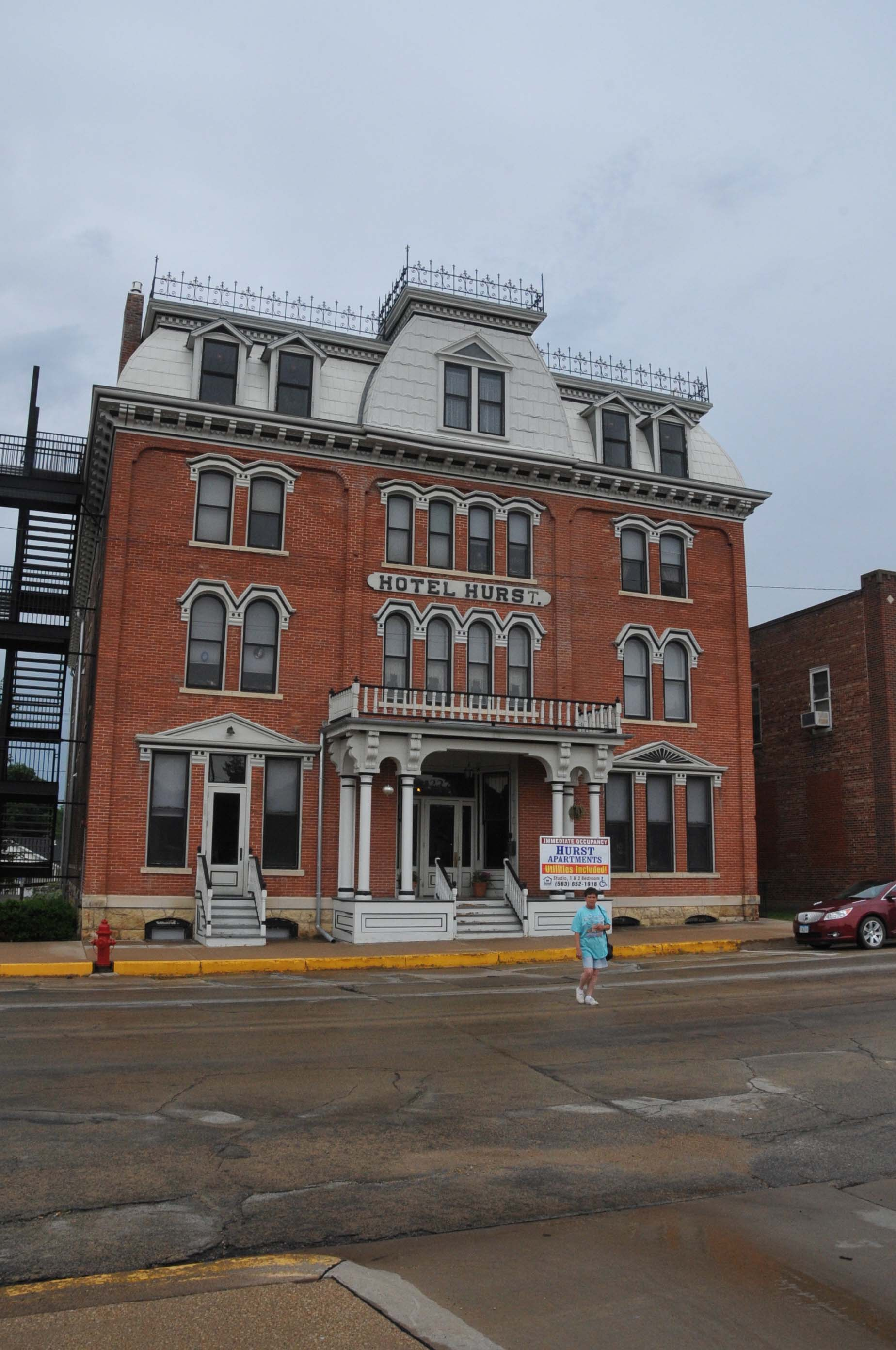

- Location within Iowa Location within the United States
- Location: 227 S. Main; Maquoketa, Iowa
- Coordinates: 42°04′00″N 90°39′54″W
- Area: less than one acre
- Built: 1897
- Built by: Wm. Hancock; W.P. Thomas
- Architectural style: Second Empire
- MPS: Maquoketa MPS
- NRHP reference No.: 89002105
- Added to NRHP: December 27, 1989

The Hotel Hurst is a historic building located in Maquoketa, Iowa, United States. It was built in 1897 as the Delmonico Hotel by a group of local investors who desired a first-class hotel in town. The building was constructed towards the end of Maquoketa's financial boom years that had begun with the arrival of the railroad in 1870 and the county seat designation in 1873. The three-story, brick Second Empire style building anchors the southern end of the central business district. It features decorative cast hoodmolds over the windows on the main facade, and a mansard roof. The iron cresting on top of the building is not the original. The building was listed on the National Register of Historic Places in 1989. It has subsequently been converted into an apartment building. The Hotel Hurst Garage, which was located immediately north of the hotel, has been torn down.
