= Murray Hill Hotel =

Murray Hill Hotel may refer to:

- Murray Hill Hotel (Murray Isle), a former hotel in northwestern New York State, US
- Murray Hill Hotel (New York City), a former hotel on Park Avenue in Manhattan, New York City, US
