= McMurray (surname) =

McMurray or MacMurray is a surname. Notable people with the surname include:

- Bill McMurray (b. 1943), Scottish footballer
- Campbell McMurray (1893–?), Scottish professional footballer
- Claudia A. McMurray (b. 1958), American Assistant Secretary of State
- Fred MacMurray (1908–1991), American actor
- Edward James McMurray, Canadian politician
- Georgia L. McMurray (1934–1992) American administrator and an activist for children, adolescents, and people with disabilities
- Howard J. McMurray, American politician
- Jack McMurray, Jr., Australian rules football field umpire
- Jack McMurray, Sr., Australian rules football field umpire
- Jalen McMurray (born 2003), American football player
- Jamie McMurray, NASCAR driver
- John MacMurray, Canadian musician
- John Macmurray, Scottish philosopher
- John E. McMurry, (b. 1942), American organic chemist
- Jon McMurray, Canadian freeskier
- Margaret McMurray, Scottish Gaelic speaker
- Sarah Ann McMurray (née Silcock, 1848-1943), New Zealand Craftswoman and woodcarver
- Sam McMurray, American actor
- Thomas Porter McMurray, British surgeon
- W. Grant McMurray, Canadian Latter Day Saint
- Will McMurray (1882–1945), American baseball catcher
- William McMurray (engineer) (1929–2006), power electronics pioneer
- William McMurray (politician) (ca. 1813–1868), New York politician
- William McMurray, founder of Fort McMurray, Canada
- William McMurray (priest), 19th century Canadian Anglican bishop
