= Hotel Hurst Garage =

Historic building in Maquoketa, Iowa, US

- U.S. National Register of Historic Places
- Location within Iowa Location within the United States
- Location: 227 S. Main; Maquoketa, Iowa
- Coordinates: 42°04′00″N 90°39′54″W
- Area: less than one acre
- Built: 1910
- MPS: Maquoketa MPS
- NRHP reference No.: 89002109
- Added to NRHP: December 27, 1989

The Hotel Hurst Garage, also known as the Roberts Garage, was a historic building located in Maquoketa, Iowa, United States. It was built in 1910 by the owner of the Hotel Hurst next door. The owner of the Decker House Hotel had built a similar building two years earlier. The Hurst sold Buicks and the Decker sold Cadillacs. The cars could serve the needs of the hotels' guests, and it provided an automobile rental service as well as automobile sales. It was a single-story brick structure that featured a tri-partite design. The central garage door was flanked by two display windows that showed off the new cars. The decorative elements were reserved to the top of the building, and included a broad brick paneled frieze, brick corbelled cornice, and a metal cornice. The building was listed on the National Register of Historic Places in 1989. It has subsequently been torn down.
