= Mount Murray (disambiguation) =

Mount Murray is a hill on the Isle of Man.

Mount Murray may also refer to:

- Mount Murray (Alberta), a summit in the Canadian Rockies
- Mount Murray (Antarctica), a granite peak in Victoria Land
- Mount Murray (British Columbia), in the Murray Range of Hart Ranges, Canada
- Mount Murray (New South Wales), a mountain near Robertson, Australia
  - Mount Murray railway station, a heritage building on the Unanderra–Moss Vale railway line

== See also ==
- Murray Mount, a spectator area at the Wimbledon tennis championships
- Murray Hill (disambiguation)
- Mount George Murray, a mountain in the Prince Albert Mountains of Victoria Land, Antarctica
