= Murray Island =

Murray Island may refer to:

- Murray Island, Queensland
- Murray Island (Montana), in Lake Koocanusa
- Murray Island (Antarctica), in Antarctica
- Murray Isle, in New York
- Murray Islands, group of islands in the South Orkney Islands
- John Murray Island, near Greenland
