= Murrayville =

Murrayville or Murraysville can refer to any of the following places:

== Canada ==
- Murrayville, British Columbia, a town within the Township of Langley.

== United States ==
- Murrayville, Illinois, a village in Morgan County
- Murrayville, Georgia, an unincorporated community in Hall County
- Murraysville, North Carolina, a census-designated place
- Murraysville, Ohio, an unincorporated community
- Murraysville, West Virginia, an unincorporated community

== Australia ==
- Murrayville, Victoria, a town in the Rural City of Mildura
