= Murray Park =

Murray Park may refer to:

== Australia ==
- Murray Park CAE (College of Advanced Education), South Australia
- Murray River National Park, South Australia
- Murray-Sunset National Park, Victoria
- Murray Valley National Park, New South Wales

== Canada ==
- Murray Beach Provincial Park, New Brunswick
- Murray Park or Murray Hill Park, other name of King George Park in Westmount, Quebec

== United Kingdom ==
- Former name of the Rangers Training Centre, the training ground of the Scottish football team Rangers F.C.
- Murray Park School, a maths and computing specialist school in Mickleover, Derby, England

== United States ==
- Murray Park, California, an unincorporated community in Marin County
- Murray City Park, a municipal park in Murray, Utah
- Murray Central Park, a municipal park in Murray, Kentucky
- Lake Murray State Park, Oklahoma

== See also ==
- Murray (disambiguation)
