= Mars Hill High School =

Historic school building in North Carolina, United States

- U.S. National Register of Historic Places
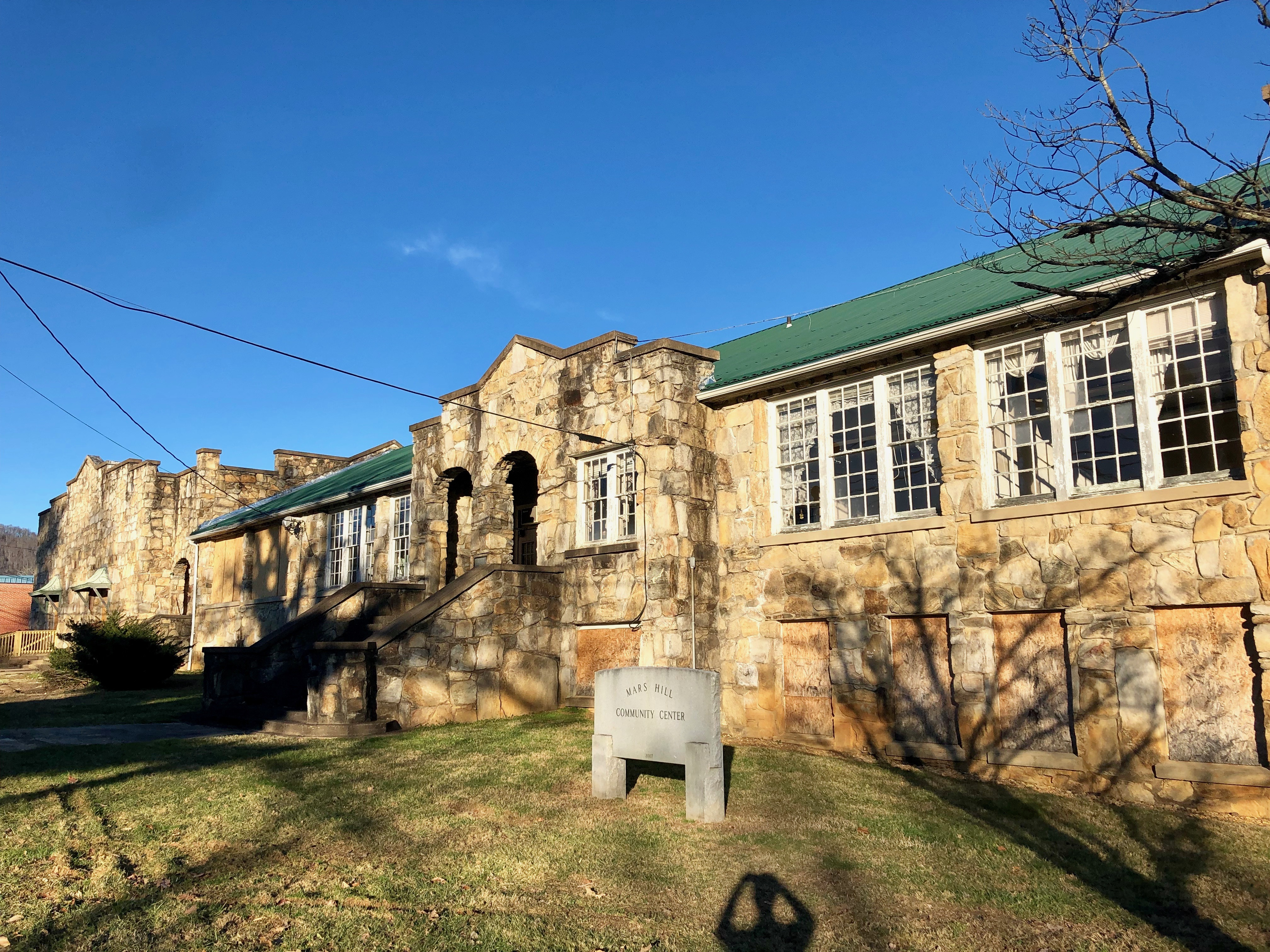
- Former Mars Hill High School, January 2019

- Location within North Carolina Location within the United States
- Location: 734 Bailey St., Mars Hill, North Carolina
- Coordinates: 35°50′6″N 82°33′9″W
- Area: less than one acre
- Built: 1936-1938
- Built by: Works Progress Administration (WPA)
- Architect: Alexander, S. Grant & Assoc.
- Architectural style: Rustic Revival
- NRHP reference No.: 05000962
- Added to NRHP: September 7, 2005

Mars Hill High School, also known as Mars Hill School and Mars Hill Elementary School, is a historic high school building located at Mars Hill, Madison County, North Carolina. It was built between 1936 and 1938 by the Works Progress Administration (WPA) and is a one-story native stone building in the WPA Rustic style. It consists of two sections: a rear-facing L-shaped classroom block and a gymnasium wing. Mars Hill High School continued to serve the community as a high school until a new high school was built in 1973. The building housed middle and elementary school students until 2001.

It was listed on the National Register of Historic Places in 2005.

The building is currently undergoing renovations to become resident apartments.
