= William B. Cronyn House =

Historic house in Brooklyn, New York

- U.S. National Register of Historic Places
- New York State Register of Historic Places
- New York City Landmark
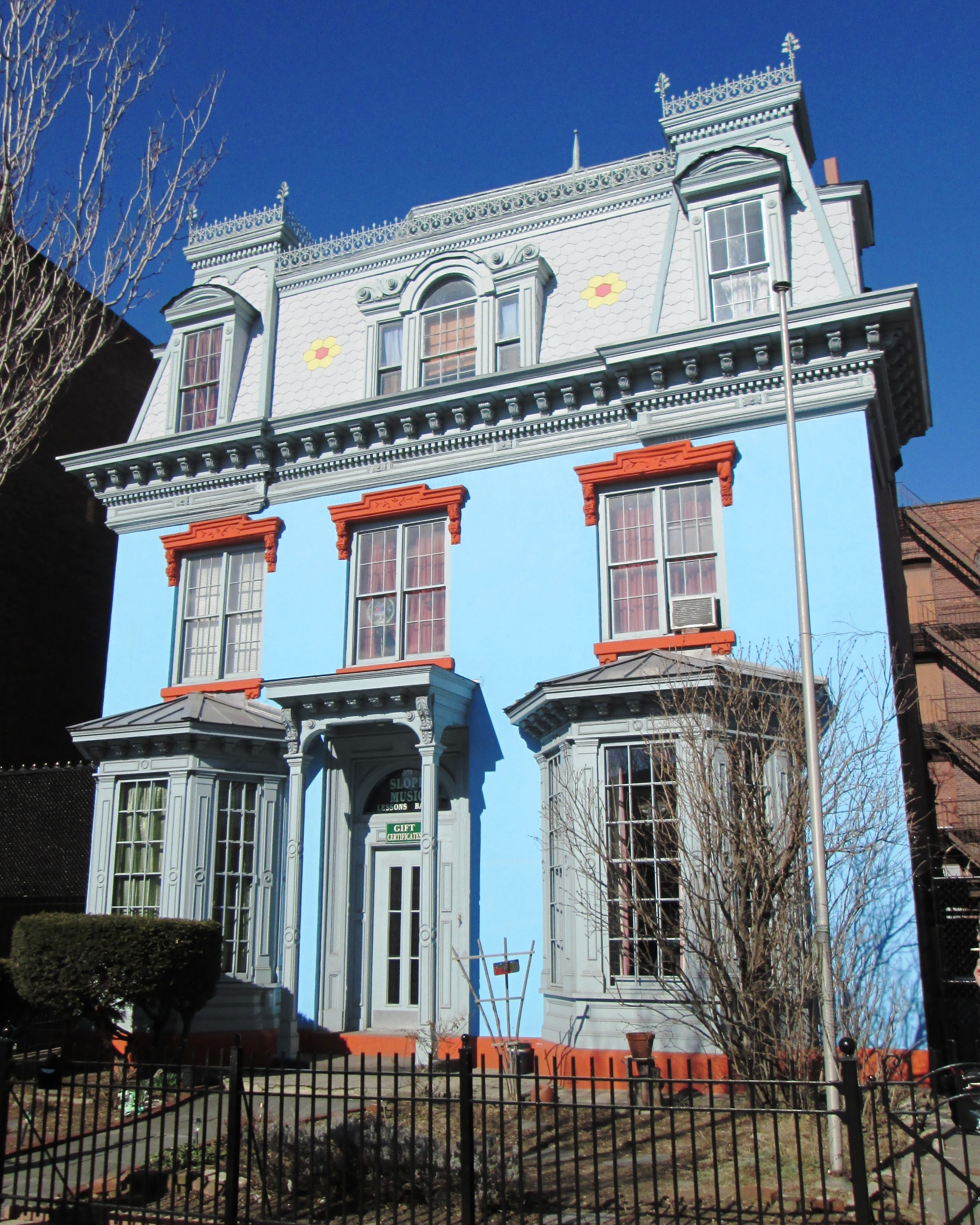
- William B. Cronyn House, April 2010

- Location within New York City Location within New York Location within the United States
- Location: 271 9th St., Brooklyn, New York
- Coordinates: 40°40′12″N 73°59′14″W
- Area: less than one acre
- Built: 1856
- Architectural style: Second Empire
- NRHP reference No.: 82005030
- NYSRHP No.: 04701.001611
- NYCL No.: 0997

Significant dates
- Added to NRHP: June 3, 1982
- Designated NYSRHP: April 9, 1982
- Designated NYCL: July 11, 1978

William B. Cronyn House, also known as the House at 271 Ninth Street, is a historic home in Park Slope, Brooklyn, New York City. It was built in 1856 and is a three-story Second Empire style dwelling with a slate covered mansard roof. The roof has ornamental iron cresting and a central half-story cupola with clerestory.

In 1898, Charles M. Higgins acquired the house for use as the headquarters of the Charles M. Higgins Company. In 1899, a five-story factory was built at 240 Eighth Street behind the property to serve as the Higgins Ink factory. The house is currently used as a residential property.

It was listed on the National Register of Historic Places in 1982.
