= Mars Hill, North Carolina =

- Town
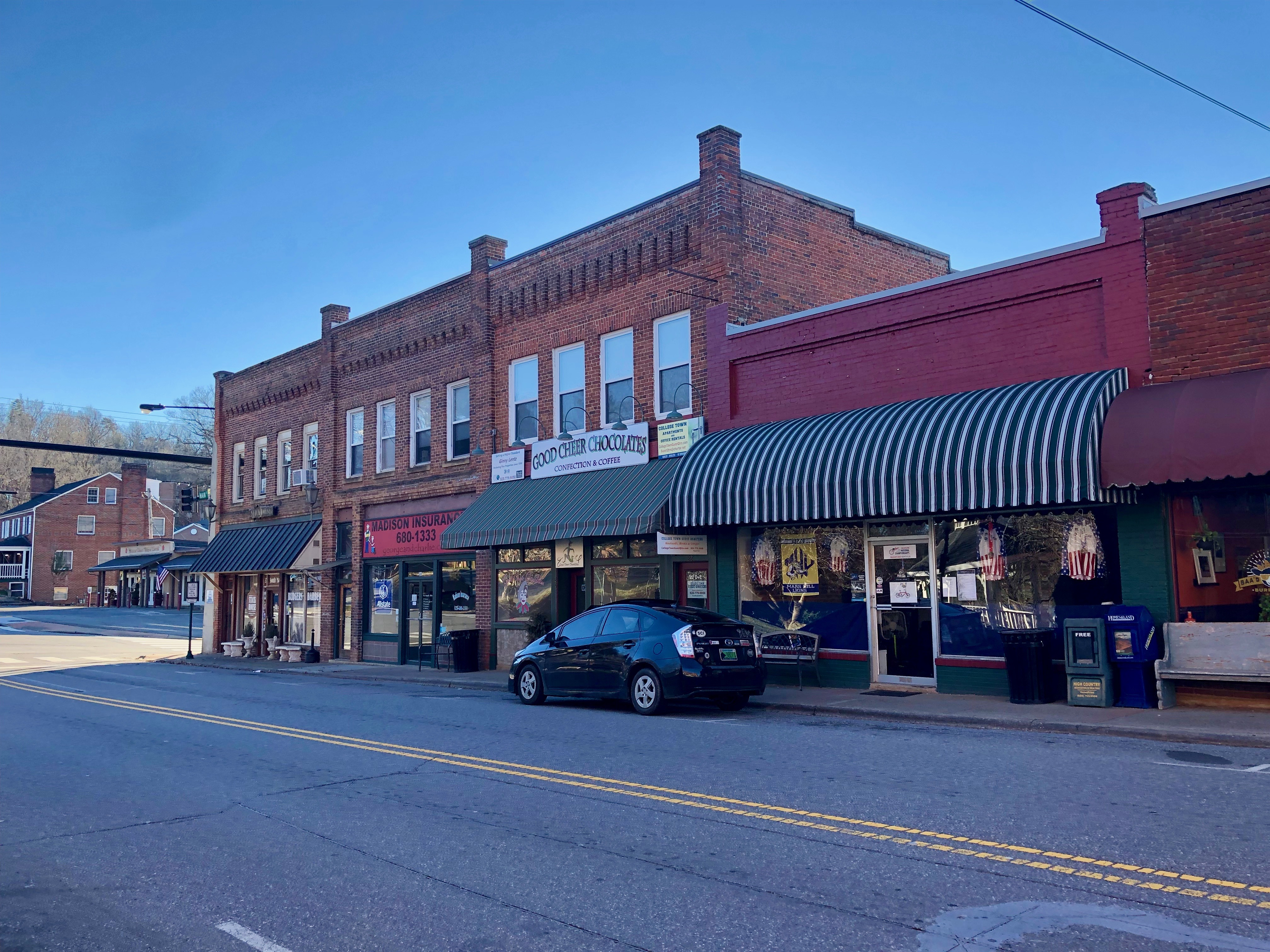
- Main Street in Mars Hill

- Seal
- Motto: "A great place to...Live Work Play Learn"
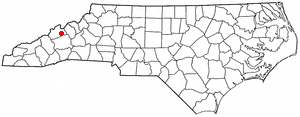
- Location in North Carolina
- Coordinates: 35°49′42″N 82°32′55″W
- Country: United States
- State: North Carolina
- County: Madison

Area
  - Total: 2.10 sq mi (5.45 km^{2})
  - Land: 2.10 sq mi (5.45 km^{2})
  - Water: 0 sq mi (0.00 km^{2})
- Elevation: 2,349 ft (716 m)

Population (2020)
  - Total: 2,007
  - Density: 954.2/sq mi (368.43/km^{2})
- Time zone: UTC-5 (Eastern (EST))
  - Summer (DST): UTC-4 (EDT)
- ZIP Code: 28754
- Area code: 828
- FIPS code: 37-41620
- GNIS feature ID: 2406102
- Website: www.townofmarshill.org

Mars Hill is a town in Madison County, North Carolina, United States. The population was 2,007 at the 2020 census, up from 1,869 in 2010. It is the home of Mars Hill University. The town is in western North Carolina, north of Asheville, and is served by Interstate 26. It is part of the Asheville Metropolitan Statistical Area.

== History ==
Long occupied by indigenous peoples, this area was not settled by European Americans much before the Revolutionary War. They were mostly yeomen and subsistence farmers, many of whom had Scotch-Irish ethnicity. The California Creek Missionary Baptist Church, Mars Hill College Historic District, Mars Hill High School, and Thomas J. Murray House are listed on the National Register of Historic Places.

== Geography ==
Mars Hill is in eastern Madison County, 17 miles (27 km) by road north of Asheville. Interstate 26 passes just east of the town, with access from Exit 11 (NC 213). The Interstate leads south to Asheville and north 43 miles (69 km) to Johnson City, Tennessee. U.S. Routes 19 and 23 leads northeast from Mars Hill 12 miles (19 km) to Cane River, and State Highway 213 passes through the center of town, leading west 9 miles (14 km) to Marshall.

According to the U.S. Census Bureau, the town has a total area of 2.1 square miles (5.4 km^{2}), all land. It is drained mainly by Gabriel Creek, which flows through the west side of town. Some of the eastern side is drained by tributaries of Big Branch. Both streams flow south to Ivy Creek, a west-flowing tributary of the French Broad River.

The town has an elevation of 2,330 feet (710 m), so the climate of the area is considerably cooler than might be expected of a town in a southern state.

== Higher education ==
Mars Hill University, a private liberal-arts college, is located in Mars Hill. Founded in 1856 by local Baptists, it is the oldest college or university in western North Carolina. Due to the presence of the university, residents of the town of Mars Hill enjoy a much greater variety of cultural, intellectual, and entertainment offerings than would usually be found in a town of its size.

== Demographics ==
Historical population
Census	Pop.	Note	%±
1900	289		—
1910	301		4.2%
1920	364		20.9%
1930	455		25.0%
1940	517		13.6%
1950	1,404		171.6%
1960	1,574		12.1%
1970	1,623		3.1%
1980	2,126		31.0%
1990	1,611		−24.2%
2000	1,764		9.5%
2010	1,869		6.0%
2020	2,007		7.4%
U.S. Decennial Census

=== 2020 census ===
Mars Hill racial composition
Race	Number	Percentage
White (non-Hispanic)	1,615	80.47%
Black or African American (non-Hispanic)	139	6.93%
Native American	5	0.25%
Asian	23	1.15%
Pacific Islander	1	0.05%
Other/Mixed	98	4.88%
Hispanic or Latino	126	6.28%

As of the 2020 census, Mars Hill had a population of 2,007 people, with 617 households, including 440 families. The median age was 26.1 years. 12.9% of residents were under the age of 18 and 16.9% were 65 years of age or older. For every 100 females, there were 85.8 males, and for every 100 females age 18 and over, there were 83.1 males age 18 and over.

0.0% of residents lived in urban areas, while 100.0% lived in rural areas.

Of all households in Mars Hill, 25.3% had children under the age of 18 living in them. 43.3% were married-couple households, 15.6% were households with a male householder and no spouse or partner present, and 33.7% were households with a female householder and no spouse or partner present. About 32.9% of all households were made up of individuals and 16.3% had someone living alone who was 65 years of age or older.

There were 725 housing units, of which 14.9% were vacant. The homeowner vacancy rate was 1.2% and the rental vacancy rate was 22.1%.

=== 2000 census ===
As of the census of 2000, there were 1,764 people, 541 households, and 312 families residing in the town. The population density was 911.7 inhabitants per square mile (352.0/km^{2}). There were 586 housing units at an average density of 302.9 per square mile (117.0/km^{2}). The racial makeup of the town was 91.21% White, 5.95% African American, 0.28% Native American, 0.85% Asian, 0.85% from other races, and 0.85% from two or more races. Hispanic or Latino of any race were 1.36% of the population.

There were 541 households, out of which 20.5% had children under the age of 18 living with them, 45.1% were married couples living together, 11.1% had a female householder with no husband present, and 42.3% were non-families. 33.1% of all households were made up of individuals, and 17.4% had someone living alone who was 65 years of age or older. The average household size was 2.10 and the average family size was 2.68.

In the town, the population was spread out, with 11.7% under the age of 18, 43.1% from 18 to 24, 16.2% from 25 to 44, 15.7% from 45 to 64, and 13.3% who were 65 years of age or older. The median age was 23 years. For every 100 females, there were 89.1 males. For every 100 females age 18 and over, there were 86.7 males.

The median income for a household in the town was $32,917, and the median income for a family was $45,000. Males had a median income of $29,615 versus $23,625 for females. The per capita income for the town was $13,366. About 11.1% of families and 16.9% of the population were below the poverty line, including 21.1% of those under age 18 and 14.9% of those age 64 or over.

== Notable people ==
- John Chandler – educator
- Tommy Hunter – fiddler
- Bascom Lamar Lunsford – folklorist and performer of traditional folk and country music from Western North Carolina
- Graham Martin – former United States Ambassador to South Vietnam
- Ray Rapp – former member of the North Carolina General Assembly
