= California Creek Missionary Baptist Church =

Historic church in North Carolina, United States

- U.S. National Register of Historic Places
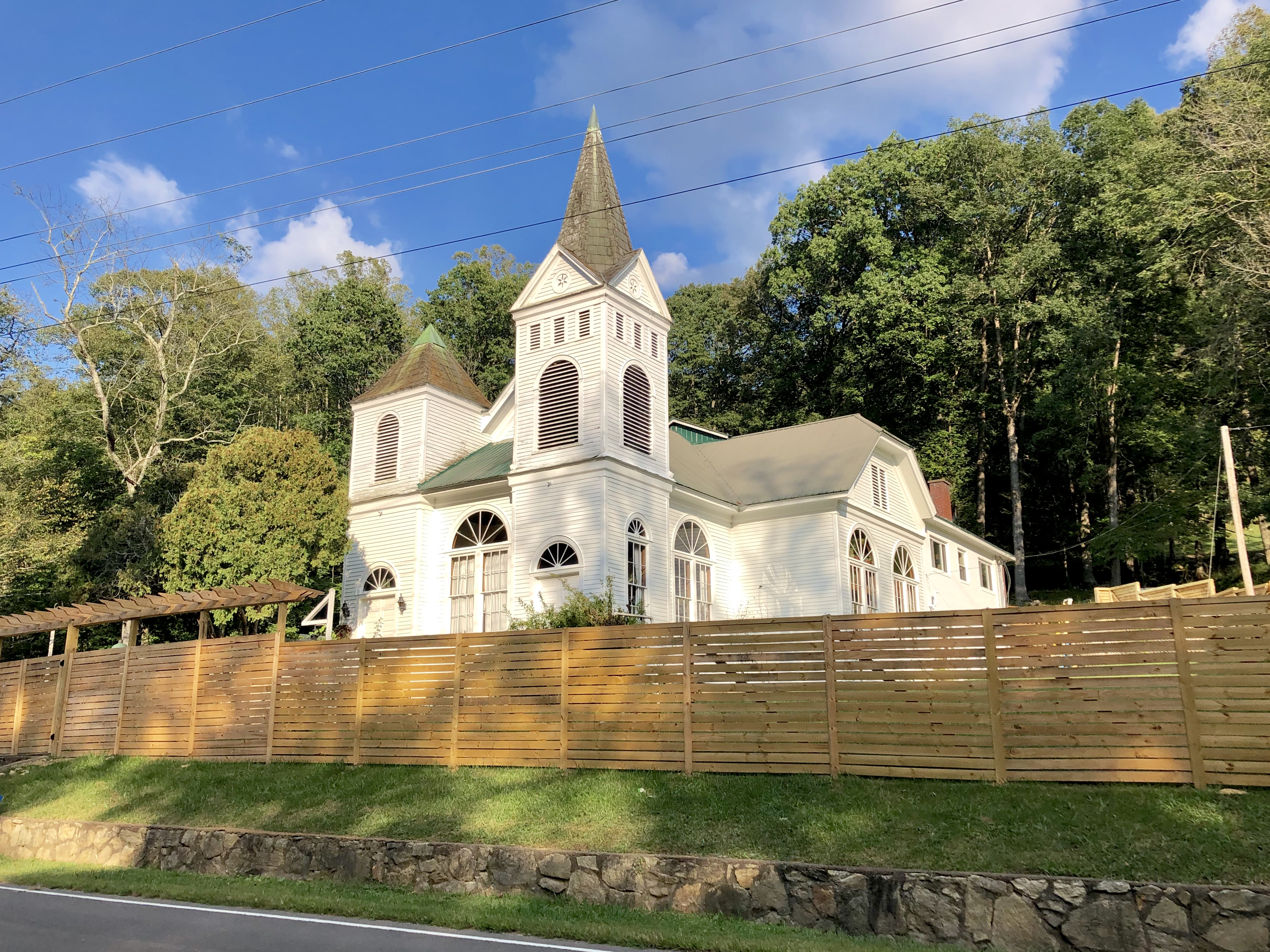

- Location within North Carolina Location within the United States
- Location: US 23, near Mars Hill, North Carolina
- Coordinates: 35°52′25″N 82°30′50″W
- Area: less than one acre
- Built: 1917
- Architect: Corn, George
- Architectural style: Colonial Revival, Gothic
- NRHP reference No.: 84002342
- Added to NRHP: July 12, 1984

California Creek Missionary Baptist Church is a historic Baptist church located near Mars Hill, Madison County, North Carolina. It was built in 1917, and moved to its present location in 1937. It is a Gothic Revival style white frame church with Colonial Revival style decorative elements. It has a cruciform plan and paired principal entrances in corner towers on the front facade. A two-story, brick Sunday School annex was built in 1954. The church was sold to private owners in the late-1970s.

It was added to the National Register of Historic Places in 1984.
