= Murray Township =

Murray Township may refer to:

== In Canada ==
- Murray Township, Ontario

== In the United States ==
- Murray Township, Newton County, Arkansas, in Newton County, Arkansas
- Murray Township, Alameda County, California
- Murray Township, Marshall County, Kansas, in Marshall County, Kansas
- Murray Township, Murray County, Minnesota
- Murray Township, Greene County, Missouri
