= James F. Murray House =

Historic house in West Virginia, United States

- U.S. National Register of Historic Places
- Location within West Virginia Location within the United States
- Location: 530 Louisiana Ave., Chester, West Virginia
- Coordinates: 40°36′42″N 80°33′42″W
- Area: 1 acre (0.40 ha)
- Built: 1903
- Architect: Snyder, J.A.
- Architectural style: Classical Revival, American Four Square
- NRHP reference No.: 90001066
- Added to NRHP: July 12, 1990

James F. Murray House, also known as Murray-Abrams House, is a historic home located at Chester, Hancock County, West Virginia. It was built 1904–1905, and is a blond brick, L-shaped dwelling in a combined Classical Revival / American Foursquare style. It featured a deep wraparound porch and porte cochere and slate covered intersecting hipped roofs. Also on the property is a large 2 1/2-story frame barn built in 1903. It was the home of James Fraser Murray, (1844-1925), an individual important in the Northern Panhandle's developing oil industry. It was listed on the National Register of Historic Places in 1990.
