= Murray, West Virginia =

- Unincorporated community
- Location within West Virginia Location within the United States
- Coordinates: 38°53′44″N 81°38′24″W
- Country: United States
- State: West Virginia
- County: Jackson
- Elevation: 663 ft (202 m)
- Time zone: UTC-5 (Eastern (EST))
  - Summer (DST): UTC-4 (EDT)
- GNIS ID: 1555183

Murray is an unincorporated community in Jackson County, West Virginia, United States.
