= Murray Hill Incorporated =

Murray Hill Incorporated was the first ever corporation to run for the United States Congress following the decision in Citizens United v. FEC that ruled that corporations are people according to the U.S. Constitution.
