= Murray High School =

Murray High School may refer to:

== Australia ==
- Murray High School, Lavington, Lavington, New South Wales

== United States ==
- Murray High School (Kentucky) in Murray, Kentucky
- Philip Murray High School, Detroit, Michigan, which became Murray-Wright High School
- Murray High School (Utah) in Murray, Utah
- Murray High School (Virginia) in Charlottesville, Virginia
- Murray Junior High School (Minnesota) in Saint Paul, Minnesota
