= McMurry reaction =

Chemical reaction

Named after	John E. McMurry
Reaction type	Coupling reaction

Identifiers
Organic Chemistry Portal	mcmurry-reaction

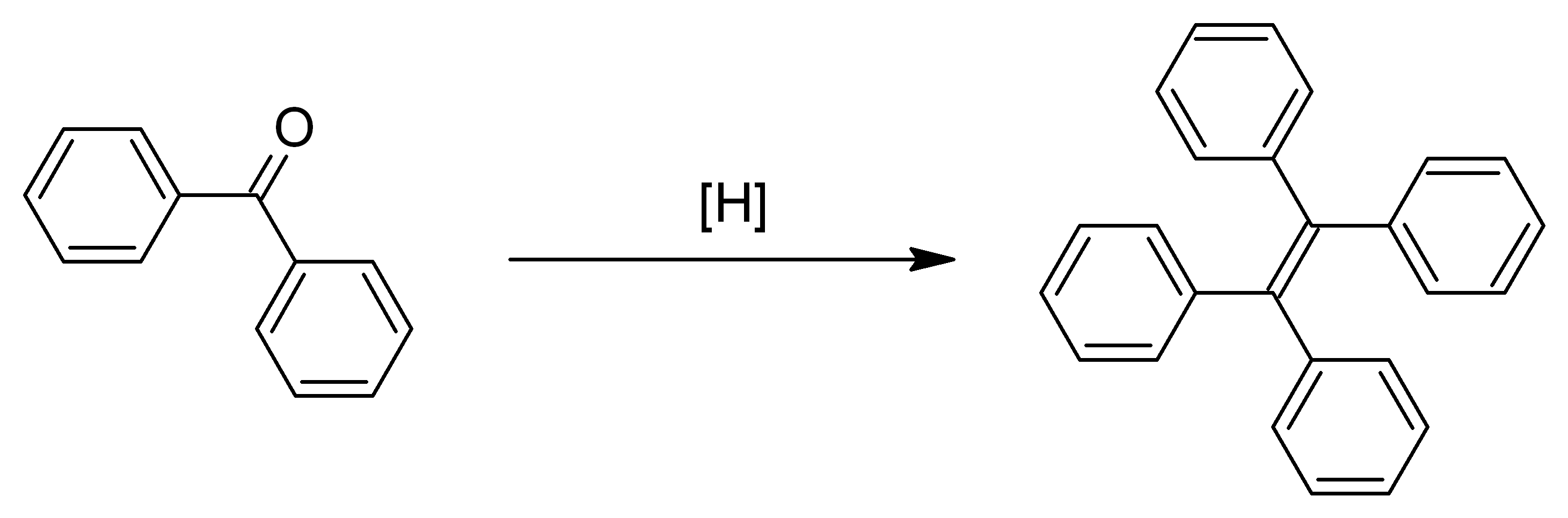
The McMurry reaction of benzophenone

The McMurry reaction is an organic reaction in which two ketone or aldehyde groups are coupled to form an alkene using a titanium chloride compound such as titanium(III) chloride and a reducing agent. The reaction is named after its co-discoverer, John E. McMurry. The McMurry reaction originally involved the use of a mixture TiCl_{3} and LiAlH_{4}, which produces the active reagents. Related species have been developed involving the combination of TiCl_{3} or TiCl_{4} with various other reducing agents, including potassium, zinc, and magnesium. This reaction is related to the Pinacol coupling reaction which also proceeds by reductive coupling of carbonyl compounds.

== Reaction mechanism ==
This reductive coupling can be viewed as involving two steps. First is the formation of a pinacolate (1,2-diolate) complex, a step which is equivalent to the pinacol coupling reaction. The second step is the deoxygenation of the pinacolate, which yields the alkene, this second step exploits the oxophilicity of titanium.

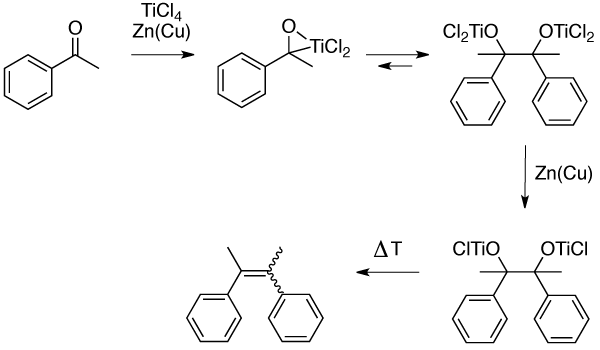
A proposed mechanism when TiCl_{4} and Zn(Cu) are used for the coupling of benzophenone, as proposed in a reference. Note that the mechanism may vary when different conditions are used.

Several mechanisms have been discussed for this reaction. Low-valent titanium species induce coupling of the carbonyls by single electron transfer to the carbonyl groups. The required low-valent titanium species are generated via reduction, usually with zinc powder. This reaction is often performed in THF because it solubilizes intermediate complexes, facilitates the electron transfer steps, and is not reduced under the reaction conditions. The nature of low-valent titanium species formed is varied as the products formed by reduction of the precursor titanium halide complex will naturally depend upon both the solvent (most commonly THF or DME) and the reducing agent employed: typically, lithium aluminum hydride, zinc-copper couple, zinc dust, magnesium-mercury amalgam, magnesium, or alkali metals. Bogdanovic and Bolte identified the nature and mode of action of the active species in some classical McMurry systems, and an overview of proposed reaction mechanisms has been published. It is of note that titanium dioxide is not generally a product of the coupling reaction. Although it is true that titanium dioxide is usually the eventual fate of titanium used in these reactions, it is generally formed upon the aqueous workup of the reaction mixture.

== Background and scope ==
The reaction was discovered independently by three different groups in 1973-74: Mukaiyama in Japan, Tyrlik in Poland, and McMurry in the USA. McMurry later described his discovery as being serendipitous. McMurry and Fleming coupled retinal to give carotene using a mixture of titanium trichloride and lithium aluminium hydride. Other symmetrical alkenes were prepared similarly, e.g. from dihydrocivetone, adamantanone and benzophenone (the latter yielding tetraphenylethylene). A McMurry reaction using titanium tetrachloride and zinc is employed in the synthesis of a first-generation molecular motor.

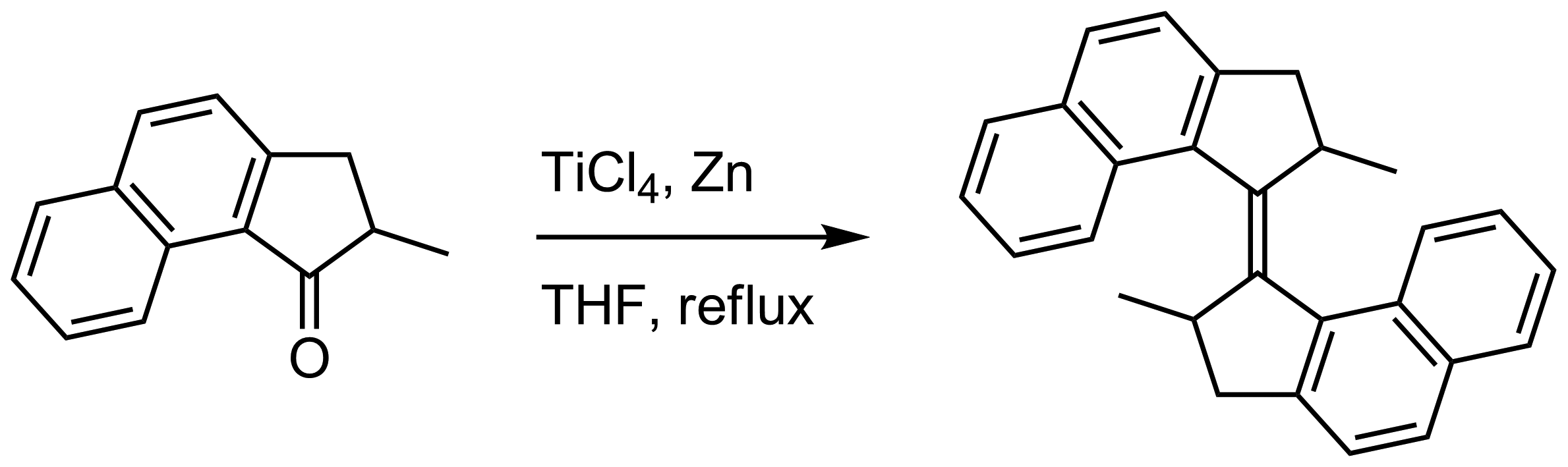
McMurry coupling to a molecular motor

In another example, the Nicolaou's total synthesis of Taxol uses this reaction, although coupling stops with the formation of a cis-diol, rather than an olefin. Optimized procedures employ the dimethoxyethane complex of TiCl_{3} in combination with the Zn(Cu). The first porphyrin isomer, porphycene, was synthesised by McMurry coupling.

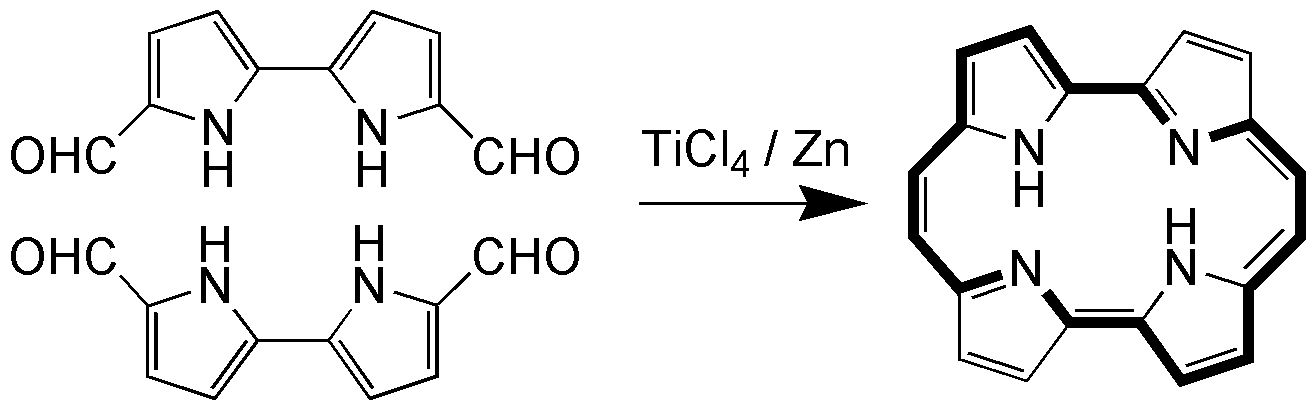
Porphycene, first porphyrin isomer, synthesis from bipyrrole dialdehyde through McMurry coupling reaction
