= Murray Town =

Murray Town may refer to

- Murray Town, Sierra Leone, a district of Freetown
- Murray Town, South Australia, a town in the mid north of South Australia

== See also ==
- Murrayville (disambiguation)
