= Murray (escapologist) =

Australian escapologist and illusionist

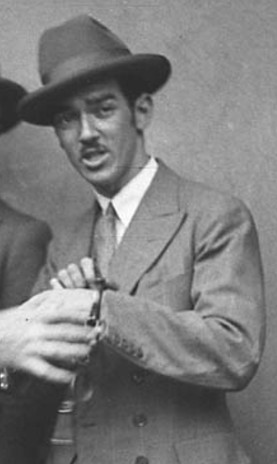
- Murray during performance in 1928
- Born: Norman Murray Carrington Walters; 11 November 1901; Melbourne, Australia
- Died: 22 January 1988 (aged 86); Blackpool, England
- Occupation(s): Escapologist, illusionist
- Years active: 1920s–1953

Norman Murray Carrington Walters (11 November 1901 – 22 January 1988), who used the mononym Murray, was an Australian escapologist and illusionist, who found international success between the 1920s and 1950s and settled in Britain.

== Biography ==
He was born in Melbourne, Australia, the son of William Carrington Walters. Some sources suggest that his full birth name was Leo Norman Maurien Murray Stuart Carrington Walters, though official records generally show him as Norman Murray Walters. As a boy, he saw other illusionists and escapologists, including Houdini, and practised his own routines by handcuffing himself to his bed each night until he managed to free himself.

He found work crewing ships, developing and performing his act in cities around the world when docked, and adding illusions to his act as well as escapology (a word that he claimed to have coined, though in fact it had been used earlier by Houdini). He performed in the United States, India, South Africa and South America before arriving in Britain in 1926. He told one interviewer that "the feat he was most proud of was being secured to the track of the Peking-Shanghai Railway ten minutes before the Shanghai Express was due to leave the station. He escaped when the train was only 100 yards away."

Arriving in Britain almost unknown, he soon began topping variety bills, and was seen as the successor to Houdini, who had recently died. He developed a full evening theatrical show, and was billed as "Murray - The most amazing, sensational and mysterious man of this or any other age." His stunts included escaping from a straitjacket while suspended from a crane above Piccadilly Circus, being thrown out of an aeroplane over the Bristol Channel while locked inside a mailbag, and being locked in a safe and thrown into the sea.

He continued to tour the world, performing before Adolf Hitler in Germany in 1939, before having to flee the country by bicycle to Denmark at the outbreak of the Second World War in order to avoid internment. He married in London in 1942, and worked in Britain and Scandinavia after the end of the war, before retiring from performance in 1953. He then set up a magic store, Murray's Magic Mart, in Blackpool, England, which he ran himself until it closed in 1986.

Murray died in Blackpool in 1988, aged 86.
