= Murray Hill =

Murray Hill may refer to:

== Communities and locations ==
- Murray Hill, Kentucky, a small city in Kentucky
- Murray Hill, Manhattan, a neighborhood in the borough of Manhattan in New York City
- Murray Hill, Queens, a neighborhood in the borough of Queens in New York City
- Murray Hill, New Jersey, an unincorporated area within New Providence, New Jersey and Berkeley Heights, New Jersey
- Murray Hill, Christmas Island, the highest point on Christmas Island
- Murray Hill (Jacksonville), a neighborhood of Jacksonville, Florida
- Murray Hill (Delhi, New York), a historic house
- Murray Hill (Loudoun County, Virginia), a historic house and estate
- Murray Hill, a neighborhood on the east side of Milwaukee, Wisconsin
- Murray Hill, a road that forms the apex of Cleveland's Little Italy neighborhood, which is also used eponymously by locals for the neighborhood itself

== Transportation ==
- Murray Hill station (LIRR), in Murray Hill, Queens, New York
- Murray Hill station (NJ Transit) in Murray Hill, New Jersey
- A train operated by Amtrak as part of the Clocker service
- Murray-Hill company, namesake of the 1969 Murray-Hill riot in Montreal, caused in part by its transport monopoly at Montréal–Dorval International Airport

== People ==
- Murray Hill (performer), drag king based in New York City
- Murray Hill (politician) (1923–2003) born Charles Murray Hill, South Australian MLC and real estate agent
- Murray K. Hill (1865–1942), American vaudeville comic and recording artist
- Murray Hill (seed technologist) – New Zealand seed technologist (1939–2020)

== Other uses ==
- Murray Hill Incorporated a public relations firm planning to run for a seat in the U.S. Congress

== See also ==
- Mount Murray (disambiguation)
