= Murray Motor Car Company =

American automobile manufactureer

- Industry: Automobile
- Founded: 1916
- Founder: William M. Murray
- Defunct: 1920
- Headquarters: Pittsburgh, Pennsylvania
- Products: automobiles

Murray Motor Car Company was an American automobile manufacturer based in Pennsylvania.

== Company history ==
William N. Murray, who worked for a Packard distributor, founded the company in Pittsburgh in 1916. His goal was to create powerful, distinctive "prestige" cars. Murray was an automotive enthusiast and was said to have driven the first motorized vehicle, a De Dion-Bouton tricycle, on the streets of Pittsburgh. The company was located at 3727 Webster Avenue in Pittsburgh with the manufacturing facility at 3700 Grand Boulevard. The same year, automobile production began. In December 1916, the first vehicles were on display at the New York Show. Production ended in 1920. In 1917 James Radcliffe Murray, president of the company's other office in Baltimore was killed in an automobile accident while test driving a new car. The company made 269 vehicles in total: 121 vehicles in 1917; 87 in 1918; and 61 in 1919. Their sales manager resigned in 1920.

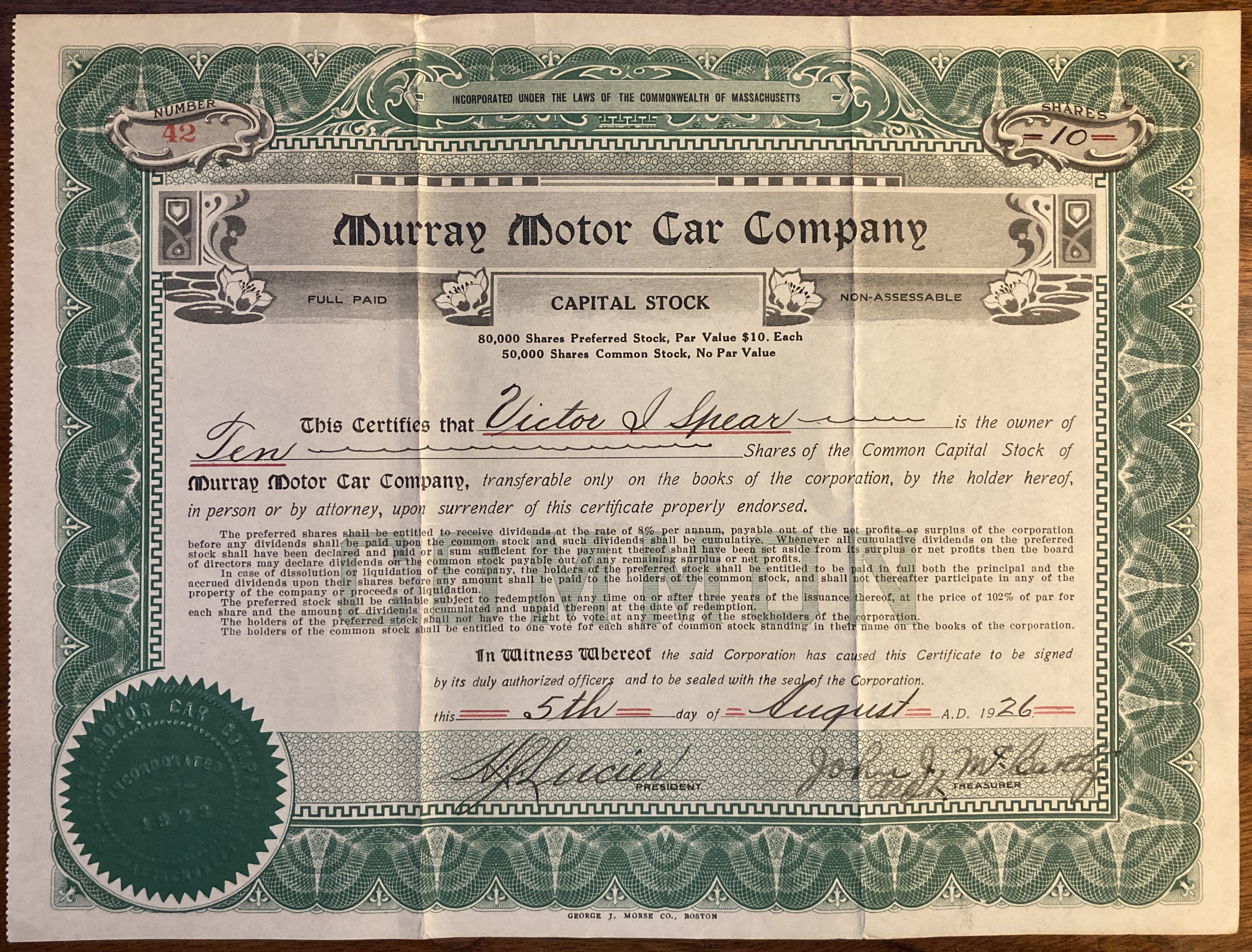
Murray Motor Car Company Stock Certificate from 1926 signed by John J. McCarthy

In 1920 the company went into receivership and was purchased and moved production to Newark, New Jersey and Murray was said to still be involved. The company opened up a service station in New York City. The company was then reorganized in Boston, Massachusetts under the leadership of John J. McCarthy as the Murray-Mac Car Company and operated until 1929, though it still issued stock under the name "Murray Motor Car Company".

== Vehicles ==
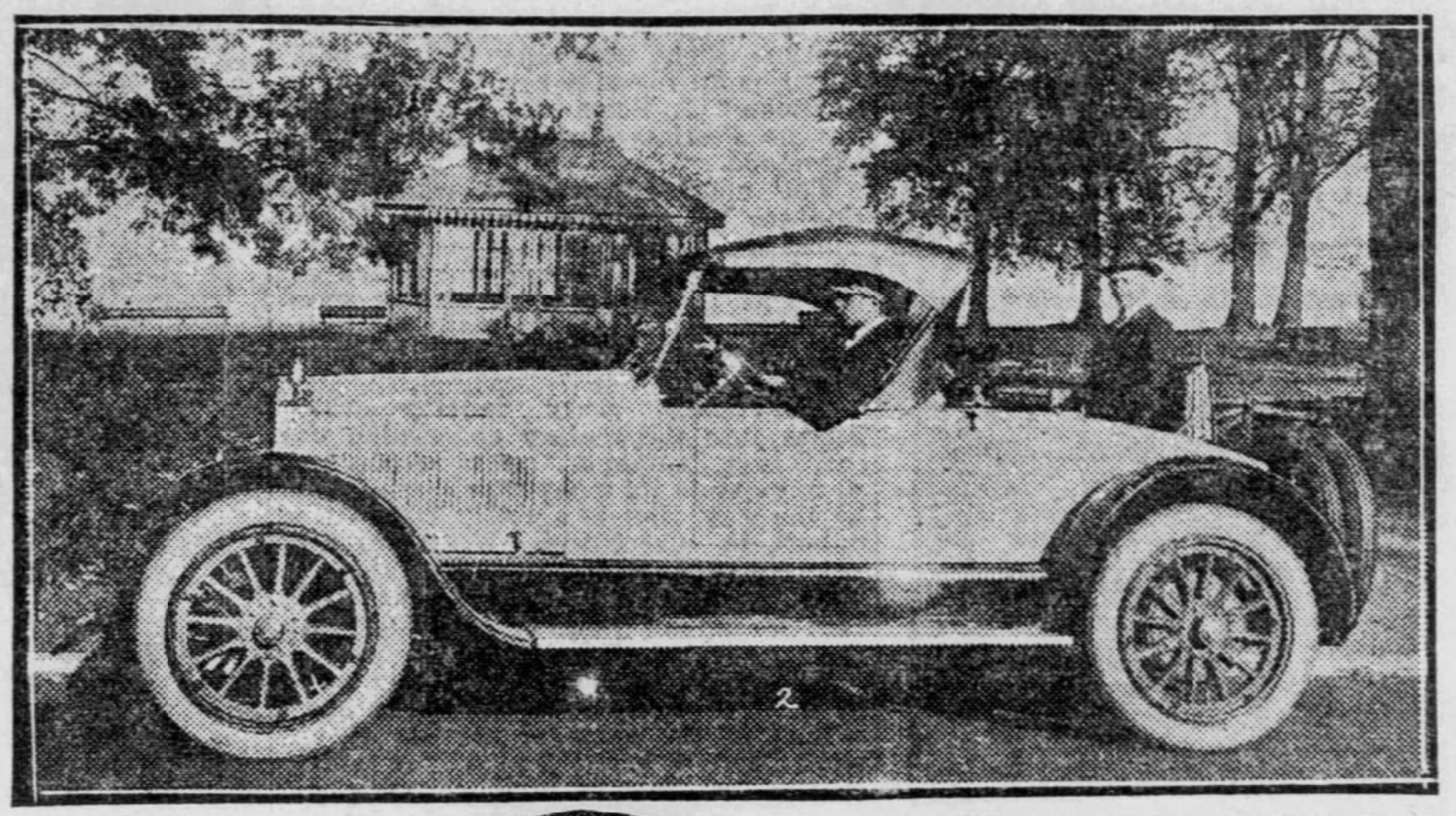
J. Radcliffe Murray at the wheel of a Murray Eight

The company made one basic model in 1917. The Eight had a V8 engine from Herschell-Spillman with Westinghouse starters and lighting. It was rated at 34 horsepower. The aluminum chassis, with "colors optional" had a 128-inch wheelbase. The 1917 models had electric clocks and slanted windshields. In 1918, a touring car with seven seats and a roadster with two seats were available. Both new cars had radiators "of the Rolls Royce type." In 1918 the price of the seven-passenger touring car was raised from $2550 to $2800.

In 1918, the roadster remained unchanged. The 1918 touring car had four seats. The touring car was described at the New York Auto show.

so very angular that it was positively cubist. Nothing better than this car could illustrate the tendency to run to the very extreme of anything new. If there was an angle acute, obtuse, indiscreet or impertinent that this car does not contain, you would have to go to Euclid to find out what it was and to name it.

The "cubist motor car" description caught on. Their stock car was described that way in Vogue magazine in 1918, pointing out the square mud-guards and saying the car was "entirely individual and distinctive." A limousine with five seats was also added. The 1918 models came with shock absorbers as standard equipment. When production moved from Pittsburgh to Newark, the company planned "only a few minor changes" to their models.

Very few Murray-Mac cars were ever built. They came on to the market "one or two at a time" and "none of them were exactly alike." The company produced specifications for a car called the Murray-Mac 70-T, a six-cylinder car, but it's unclear if any were ever built. The Boston company came out with a new car, the Murray Six, in 1926 which was shown at the Boston Automobile Show.

== Models ==
Year	Model	Cylinder (engine)	Horsepower	Wheelbase (in)	Construction
1917	Eight	8	34	128	Touring wagon 7-seat, Roadster 2-seat
1918	Eight	8	34	128	Touring wagon 4-seat, Roadster 2-seat, Limousine 5-seat
1921	Six	6	52	128	
1922	70-T	6		131	
