= Decker House Hotel =

- U.S. National Register of Historic Places
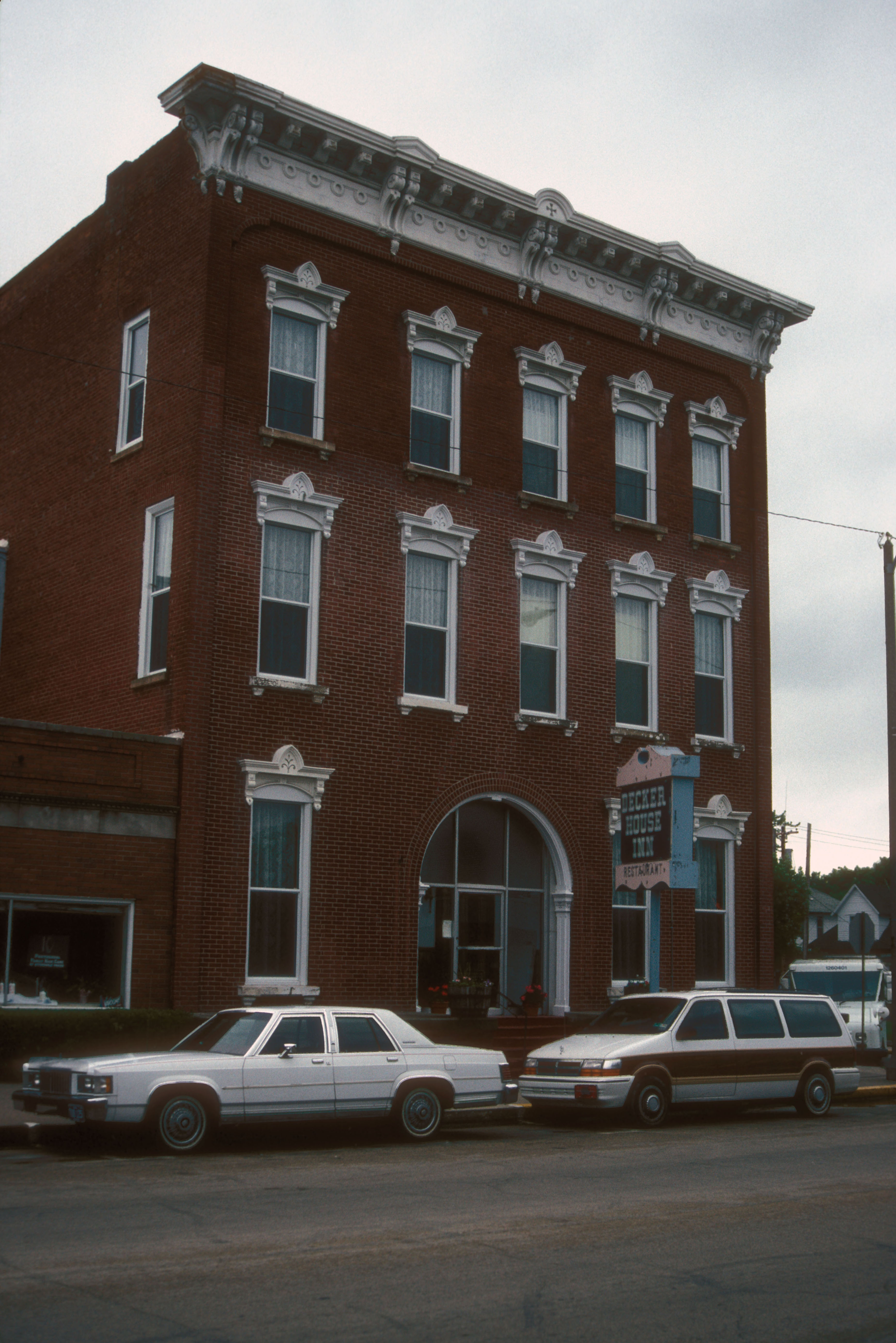

- Location within Iowa Location within the United States
- Location: 128 N. Main St. Maquoketa, Iowa
- Coordinates: 42°04′13″N 90°40′04″W
- Area: less than one acre
- Built: 1876-1878
- Architect: W.W. Tucker
- Architectural style: Italianate
- NRHP reference No.: 78003451
- Added to NRHP: December 29, 1978

The Decker House Hotel is a historic building located in Maquoketa, Iowa, United States. James Decker, an entrepreneur from Watertown, New York held numerous real estate holdings in and around Maquoketa. He built the first Decker House, a frame structure, in 1856. After Maquoketa was named the county seat in 1873, Decker decided to replace it. The three-story, brick, Italianate building was designed by Watertown architect W.W. Tucker. Its decoration is limited to the north and east elevations. Noteworthy, is its metal cornice and window hoods. It opened in May 1878, and it had two other competitors in town at that time. Following his death in 1881, James Decker's son Leonard took over his holdings in New York and Iowa. He moved into the Decker House in 1885 and died there in 1900. The building has subsequently lost its entrance porch, original front doors and the pediment over the cornice. It was listed on the National Register of Historic Places in 1978.
