= Murray K. Hill =

American comic (1865–1942)

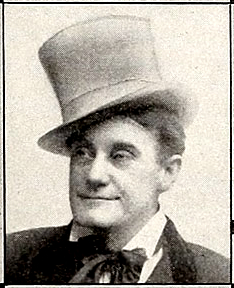
- Born: Joseph Tunnicliffe Pope, Jr. April 15, 1865; New York, N.Y.
- Died: October 22, 1942 (aged 77); Chicago
- Other names: Murry K. Hill
- Occupations: Recording artist, Comedian
- Years active: 1900–1920s

Joseph Tunnicliffe Pope, Jr. (April 15, 1865 – October 22, 1942), known professionally as Murray K. Hill (sometimes "Murry") was an American vaudeville comic and recording artist active from the 1900s-1920s.

Hill was born in New York City to Joseph Tunnicliffe Pope and Elizabeth Pope (Bradley). He began performing in New York by 1900, but soon moved to Chicago and toured the vaudeville theaters of the mid-west. His stage act consisted of silly monologues and parody songs, sometimes in blackface.

Hill began recording for Edison Records in August 1907, beginning with comic songs like "In the Good Old Steamboat Days" (Edison Standard #9619) and "Oh, Glory!" (Edison Standard #9940) then moving more toward comic monologues as Edison rolled out the 4-minute "Amberol" line. Hill began recording for Victor in 1909 and Columbia in 1911. He recorded a few cylinders each for the Indestructible Record Company and the U.S. Everlasting company around the same time.

On record, Hill's style combined monologues and song, vacillating between silly, nonsensical rants and droll asides. His "Bunch of Nonsense" and "Tale of the Cheese", both recorded for various companies, were his signature works, though the content of each varied significantly. He continued performing on stage after retiring from recording in 1911. He died in Chicago on October 22, 1942.

== See also ==
- Cal Stewart
- Russell Hunting
- Raymond Hitchcock
