= Murray Hill Hotel (Murray Isle) =

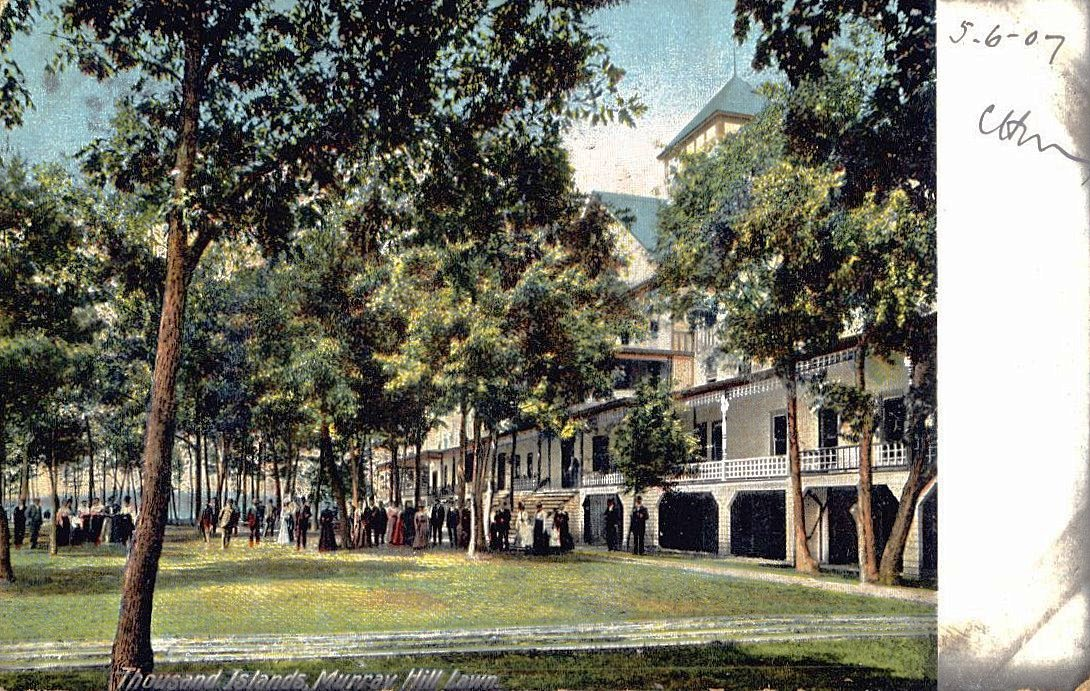
Murray Hill Hotel

Murray Hill Hotel was located on Murray Isle in the Thousand Islands region of the St. Lawrence River in the U.S. state of New York. Built in 1895, and closed in 1915, it could accommodate 500 guests.

== History ==
The hotel was initially owned by Amasa Corbin Jr. of Gouverneur and Capt. James "Jack" Taylor. A seasonal hotel, it was open from May to September for 20 years. Although the hotel had modern amenities, the various lessees led to a failing enterprise. In 1912, it was sold to the Republic Trust Company of Dallas, Texas, but it closed three years later, and was demolished in 1942.

== Architecture and fittings ==
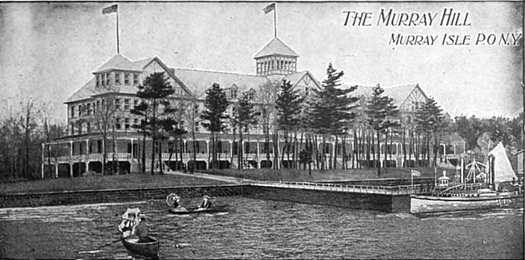
Exterior view

The hotel was constructed in 1895 at a cost of US$100,000. It measured 300 feet (91 m) in length and four stories in height. The wraparound porch measured 520 by 18 feet (158.5 m × 5.5 m). It was equipped with electric lights and electric calls, billiard parlors, bowling alleys, elevator and fireplaces. It had what was advertised at one time as the largest dining-room, largest parlor, largest office, largest ladies' billiard-room, and longest and widest piazza of any hotel of the Adirondacks or Thousand Islands. Rates were $3.00 and $4.00 per day.

== Grounds ==
The hotel was situated on Eel Bay, and advertised fishing opportunities on the St. Lawrence River. Boating and sailing were also available.

== Bibliography ==
- Arcadia (2009). The Thousand Islands. Arcadia Publishing. ISBN 978-0-7385-6510-1.
- New York Central and Hudson River Railroad Company (1900). The Thousand Islands (Public domain ed.). Passenger department, New York Central & Hudson River Railroad.
- New York Education Company (1900). New York Education. Vol. 3–4 (Public Domain ed.). New York Education Company.
