= Murray Campbell (columnist) =

Murray Campbell (born January 20, 1950) was the director of corporate communications for Ontario Power Authority. His tenure there ended with the merger of the Ontario Power Authority into the Independent Electricity Sector Operator. He was previously a staff columnist for The Globe and Mail, and had been at that post since 2002. His career in journalism spanned 35 years, and ended in April 2009 when he left The Globe and Mail to accept his current post.

== Career ==
He joined The Globe in 1977. He has previously worked for the Toronto Star, Ottawa Citizen, and has had experience overseas in England. During his time with the Globe and Mail, he has worked in many different posts, including city editor and sports editor. He was the bureau chief in Los Angeles, California, USA from 1990 to 1993. Since then, has worked as a national and foreign desk reporter out of Toronto, but has been sent on several special assignments as a feature writer.

== Special assignments ==
Murray Campbell has filed reports from five continents. he has covered elections both in Canada and the United States, has covered four Olympic Games and was the Globe's correspondent during the aftermath of the 1994 genocide in Rwanda. He also won the Globe's Stanley McDowell award for writing in 1992, mostly for his excellent coverage of the L.A. riots and the U.S. presidential election that year.

== Education ==
He was a Southam fellow at Massey College at the University of Toronto in 1983 and did his postgraduate journalism work at Carleton University after completing his undergraduate degree at the University of Saskatchewan.

== Trivia ==
He has accumulated several aliases during his years as a journalist. It has been well documented that some people call him Maurice. He has two sons named Ian Thomas Matheson Campbell and Graeme J Campbell, and a wife named Zoe. He currently resides in Toronto, Canada. He is the brother-in-law of Globe and Mail Senior Editor Colin MacKenzie.
