= Murraysville, Ohio =

Coordinates: 41°20′12″N 82°07′20″W

Murraysville is an extinct town in Lorain County, in the U.S. state of Ohio. It was located in Carlisle Township.

== History ==
A post office called Murraysville was established in 1828, and remained in operation until 1847. The town was named for the proprietor of Murray's Mills, a local watermill. In the mid 1800s it had a saw mill, grist mill, general store, school, and about 25 houses.
