= McMurray House =

McMurray House may refer to:

- McMurray House (Lavonia, Georgia), listed on the National Register of Historic Places listings in Franklin County, Georgia
- McMurray-Frizzell-Aldridge Farm, Westminster, Maryland, listed on the NRHP in Maryland
- McMurray House (Georgetown, Texas), listed on the National Register of Historic Places in Williamson County, Texas
