= Murray Angus =

Canadian activist and educator for First Nations causes

- Occupations: Indigenous Rights Activist; College program co-founder
- Known for: Co-founding Nunavut Sivuniksavut program for instruction in land claims policy
- Awards: Member of the Order of Canada

Murray Angus CM is a Canadian activist on Indigenous issues, and the co-founder of Nunavut Sivuniksavut (NS), a college program that provides instruction to Inuit youth in Inuit history, politics, and culture, specifically on the politics and ramifications of Indigenous land claims agreements. He taught for over 25 years at Nunavut Sivuniksavut, while also publishing on topics relating to Indigenous issues and land claims policy.

== Early life and education ==
Born in Fort William, Ontario (now Thunder Bay) on October 23, 1950. Angus grew up witnessing first-hand the long-term impacts that historical treaties had on First Nations in Canada. He became an Indigenous-rights activist in the 1970's when the development of Canada's north became a central focus of public discussion and debate. His academic career included a B.A. in Religious Studies at St. Mary's University in Halifax in 1975, an M.A. in Religious Studies at Carleton University in 1978, and a Masters of Social Work degree from Carleton University in 1980. His M.S.W. studies focused on land claims policies and agreements.

== Career ==
Upon completion of his academic work, Angus became the Executive Assistant to Peter Ittinuar, the first Inuk to be elected to Parliament, from 1981 to 1983. In 1985, he co-founded Nunavut Sivuniksavut (NS), an independent eight-month college program in downtown Ottawa that exists to instruct Inuit youth from Nunavut about Inuit culture, politics, and history. The program is frequently referred to as a silattuqsarvik ("a place and time to become wise"). Having begun as a project to train land claims fieldworkers, NS now offers two separate Certificate programs: Inuit Studies, and Advanced Inuit Studies. Each program is accredited through Algonquin College in Ottawa. Since 1985, over six hundred Nunavut youth have graduated from NS.

Angus taught at Nunavut Sivuniksavut from 1985 to 1991 and then from 1998 to 2016. In between, he was employed as a researcher, policy and media consultant at a variety of organizations, including the Aboriginal Rights Coalition, the Dene Nation, the Native Council of Canada, the Inuit Tapirisat of Canada, among others.

Angus has also written several articles on Canadian land claims policy, as well as the 1991 book And the Last Shall Be First: Native Policy in an Era of Cutbacks.

On November 4, 2009, Angus was named a member of the Order of Canada, and he was invested into the order on September 12, 2014. The award was granted for "his varied contributions to building awareness and respect for Canada's Native people and their traditions, and for the role he has played in empowering Inuit youth as founder of Nunavut Sivuniksavut." In addition to his role as the co-founder of Nunavut Sivuniksavut, he was also recognized for his work as a grassroots activist on Indigenous rights issues.

== Awards ==
- Member, Order of Canada
