= Cresting (architecture) =

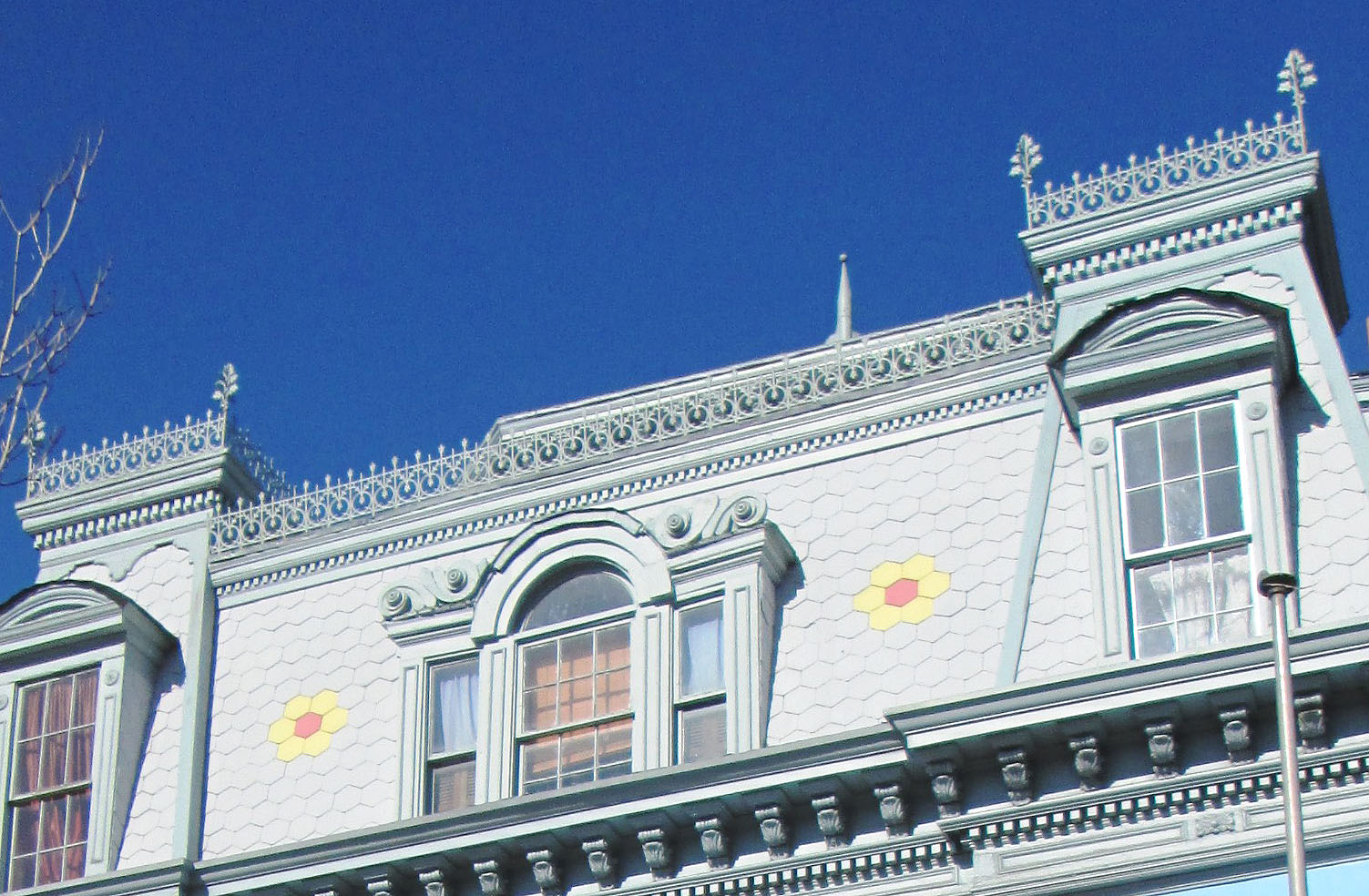
Iron cresting including a leaf design at the corners along the roof of the William B. Cronyn House in Brooklyn, New York.

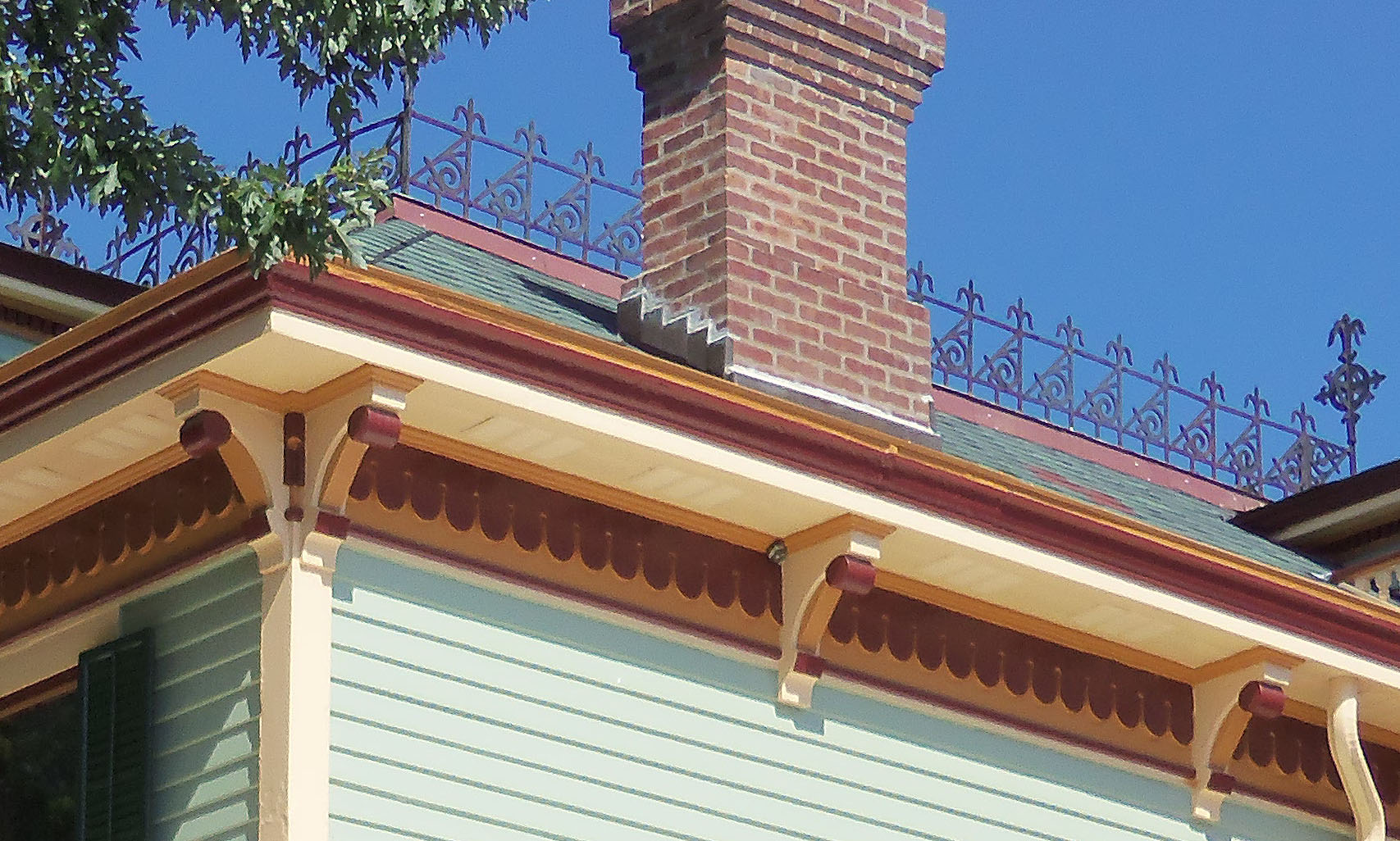
Cresting incorporating a faux weather vane design along the roof of the Thomas Murray House in Davenport, Iowa.

Cresting, in architecture, is ornamentation attached to the ridge of a roof, cornice, coping or parapet, usually made of a metal such as iron or copper. Cresting is associated with Second Empire architecture, where such decoration stands out against the sharp lines of the mansard roof. It became popular in the late 19th century, with mass-produced sheet metal cresting patterns available by the 1890s.

Cresting is typically attached to the roof by bolts, and is often installed during construction of the roof, with sealants applied to the roof directly covering the bolts to prevent water penetration and corrosion in these areas.

== See also ==
- Brattishing
