= Thomas Murray House (Davenport, Iowa) =

Historic house in Iowa, United States

- U.S. National Register of Historic Places
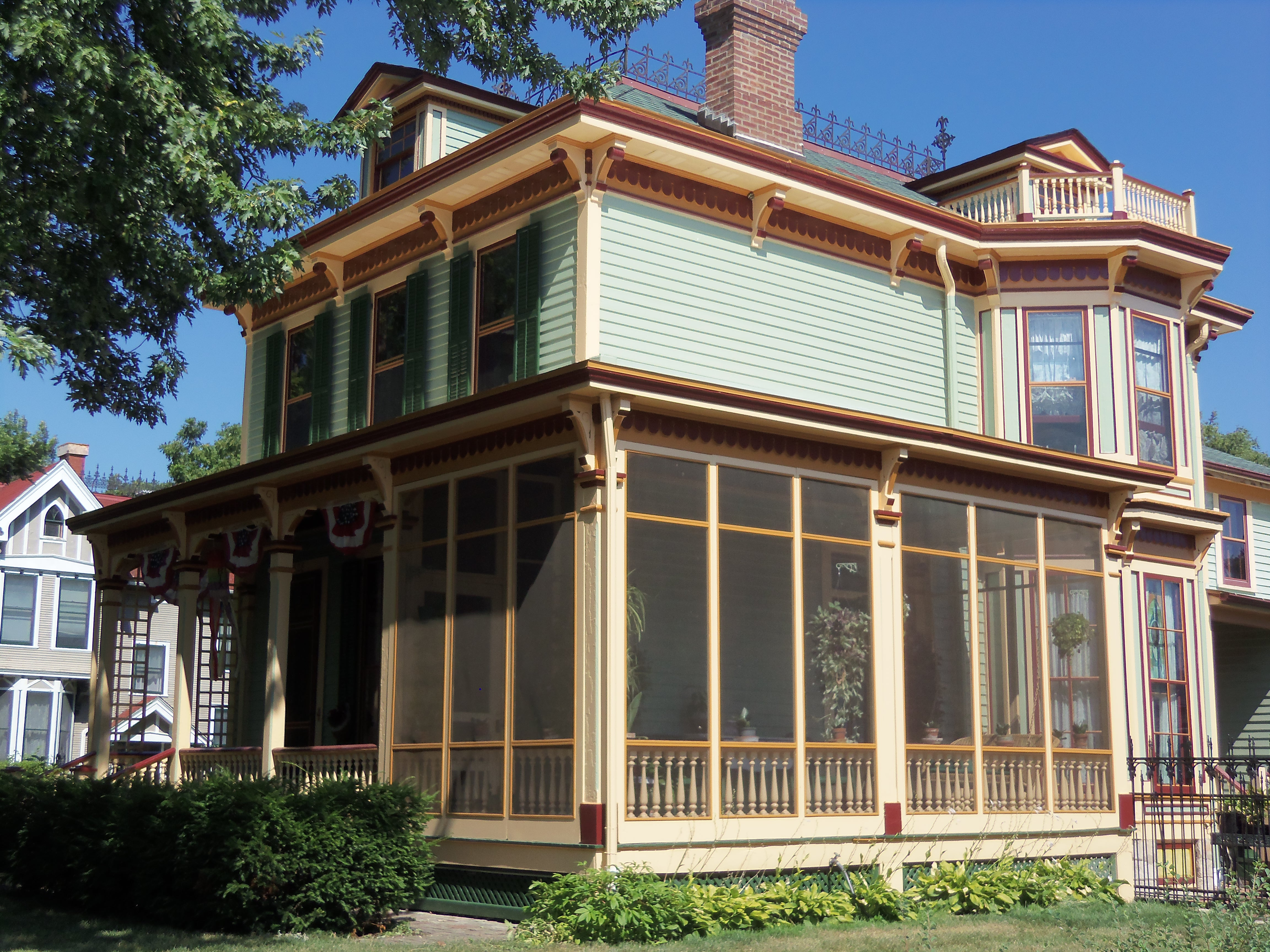

- Location within Iowa Location within the United States
- Location: 628 Kirkwood Boulevard; Davenport, Iowa
- Coordinates: 41°32′11″N 90°33′56″W
- Area: less than one acre
- Built: 1881
- Architectural style: Italianate
- MPS: Davenport MRA
- NRHP reference No.: 84001485
- Added to NRHP: July 27, 1984

The Thomas Murray House is a historic building located on the east side of Davenport, Iowa, United States. It has been listed on the National Register of Historic Places since 1984.

== History ==
Thomas Murray built this house in 1881 shortly after his marriage to Eva Daniels. He had worked as a surveyor for Scott County for more than a decade. Murray was working as Davenport's City Engineer when this house was built.

== Architecture ==
The Thomas Murray House is typical of the Italianate style houses that were being built in Davenport after the American Civil War. It forsakes the simplicity of Greek Revival decorative elements that were found in earlier Italianate houses for the verticality and millwork embellishment of the Victorian expression. The house features a square form, hipped roof with deck, roof cresting, projecting side pavilions, and a prominent bracketed wrap-around porch. The cornice has brackets and a scalloped motif that is applied to the frieze.
