= Murray Isle =

Island in New York

Coordinates: 44°17′24″N 76°03′02″W

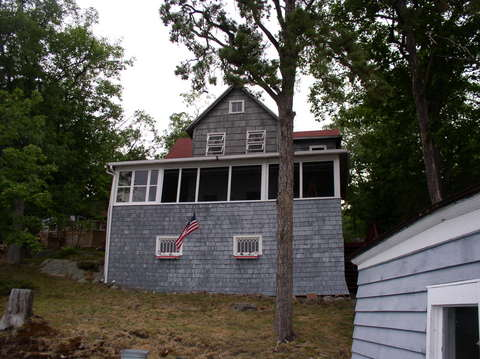
A typical summer cottage on Murray Isle

Murray Isle is an island in the Thousand Islands region of the St. Lawrence River in the U.S. state of New York. The island lies in the Town of Clayton, near its border with the Town of Orleans, in the northern part of Jefferson County.

Today, Murray Isle is the site of many summer cottages.

While the record is unclear, it is believed that the first cottage on Murray Isle was built in 1860. The structure, a simple log cabin, was owned by Daniel Sherman. By 1880, the island had four cottages, all located upriver, on the northern portion of the island.

Murray was formerly known as Hemlock Island due to the presence of that variety of tree. The name was changed in the late 18th century to Murray Hill Park after the Murray Hill area of New York City when the island was developed and lots sold off. The development was never finished. The name was shortened to its present form some time later.

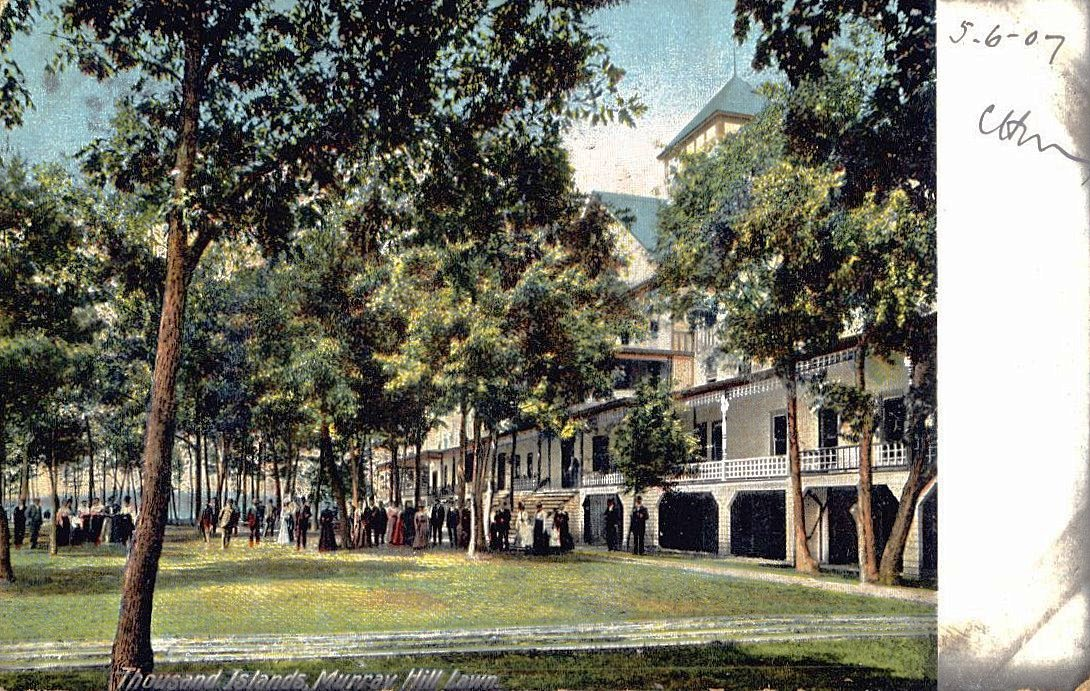
Murray Hill Hotel lawn, from 1907 postcard

The Murray Hill Hotel was built on the island in the late 19th century. It served tourists who came over on steam ships from Clayton, NY through the early 20th century when it closed and was ultimately torn down. Today a community house and post office sit on the former site of the hotel. The post office operates yearly from June until September. An annual "Fish Fry" is hosted on the grounds of the community house every summer; the event takes place on the first Saturday of July.

Murray Isle is bounded by channels on both its eastern and western tips. The channel on the island's eastern tip, known as "The Narrows" separates Murray Isle and Wellesley Island. A small islet known as Wintergreen Island (formerly Whippoorwill Island) is connected by a footbridge along the southern length of Murray.
