= John E. McMurry =

American chemist (born 1942)

John McMurry
- Born: July 27, 1942 (age 84); New York City, United States
- Education: Harvard University A.B. 1964; Columbia University Ph.D. 1967
- Known for: McMurry reaction
- Scientific career
- Workplaces: University of California, Santa Cruz, Cornell University
- Doctoral advisor: Gilbert Stork

John E. McMurry (born July 27, 1942, in New York City) is Professor Emeritus in the Department of Chemistry and Chemical Biology at Cornell University. He received an A.B. from Harvard University in 1964 and his Ph.D. from Columbia University in 1967 working with Gilbert Stork. Following completion of his Ph.D., he joined the faculty of the University of California, Santa Cruz in 1967 and moved to Cornell University in 1980.

== Contributions ==
The author of more than 100 research papers, McMurry is best known scientifically for his development of the McMurry reaction, in which two molecules of ketone or aldehyde are coupled to give an alkene when treated with titanium(III) chloride and a reducing agent such as Zn(Cu). The reaction has been widely used by the chemical community in the laboratory synthesis of many complex organic molecules and by the pharmaceutical industry in the commercial synthesis of several drugs. McMurry was elected a Fellow of the American Association for the Advancement of Science in 1985 and received a Max Planck Society Research Award in 1991.

In addition to his scientific work, McMurry is the author of 45 undergraduate chemistry textbooks that have been translated into 12 languages and used throughout the world. McMurry's most popular textbook Organic Chemistry was first printed in 1984. In 2022, he sold the rights for the book to OpenStax making it free for the user. Among his other texts are:

- Organic Chemistry with Biological Applications (3rd edition)
- Chemistry (8th edition)
- General Chemistry, Atoms First (2nd edition)
- Fundamentals of General, Organic, and Biological Chemistry (8th edition)
- The Organic Chemistry of Biological Pathways (2nd edition)
