= Thomas J. Murray House =

Historic house in North Carolina, United States

- U.S. National Register of Historic Places
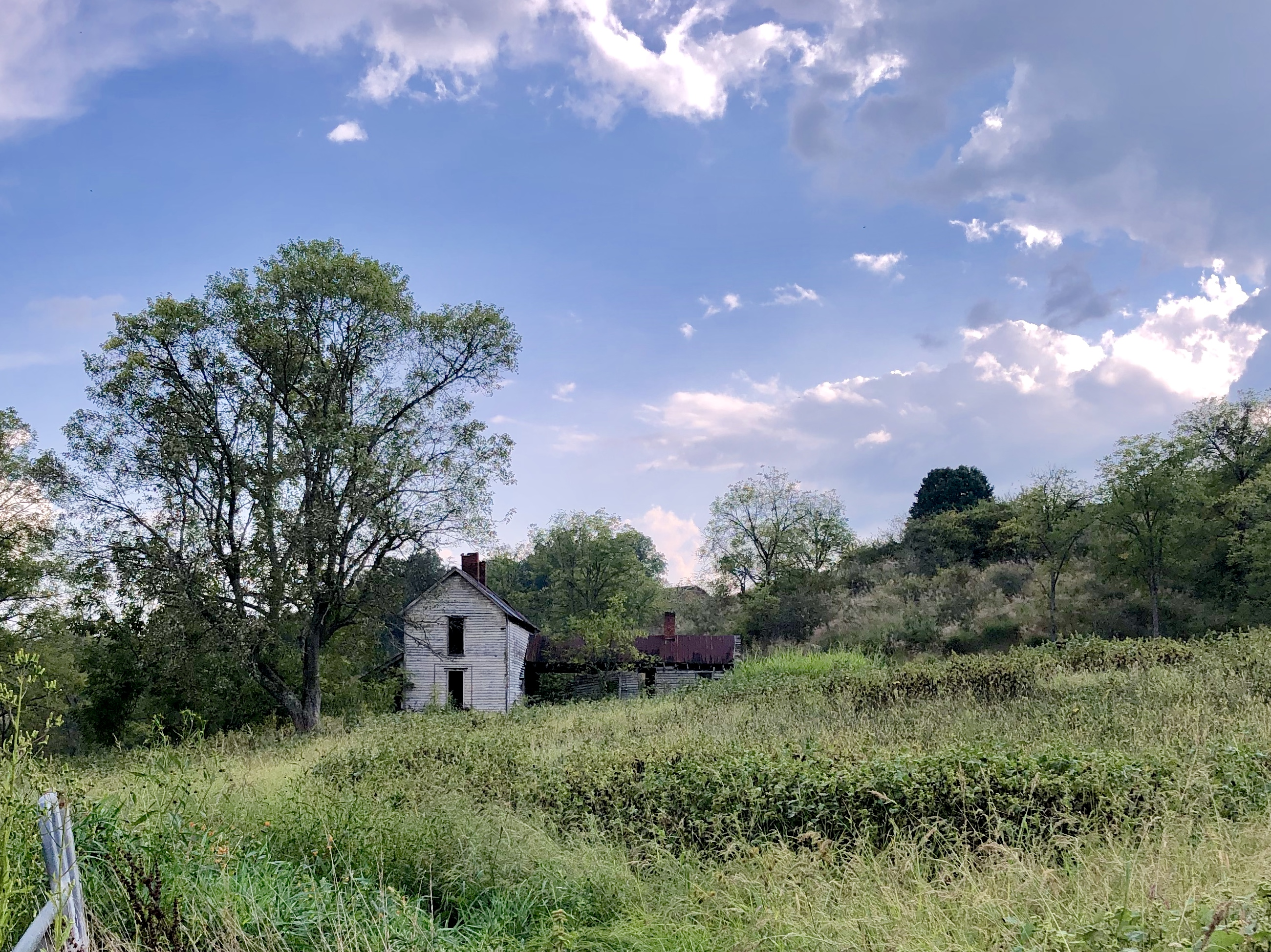
- Thomas J. Murray House, September 2019
- Nearest city: Mars Hill, North Carolina
- Area: 18 acres (7.3 ha)
- Built: 1894
- Architectural style: I-house
- NRHP reference No.: 05000514
- Added to NRHP: June 1, 2005

Thomas J. Murray House, also known as Rice Place, is a historic home located near Mars Hill, Madison County, North Carolina. It was built about 1894, and is a two-story, three-bay, single-pile frame I-house. It has a side-gabled roof, is set on a rubble stone-pier foundation, and has a full-width shed roofed front porch. Also on the property are the contributing gable-roofed livestock barn and a large gambrel roofed tobacco barn.

It was listed on the National Register of Historic Places in 2005.
