= Thomas Murray House (Virginia Beach, Virginia) =

Historic house in Virginia, United States

- U.S. National Register of Historic Places
- Virginia Landmarks Register
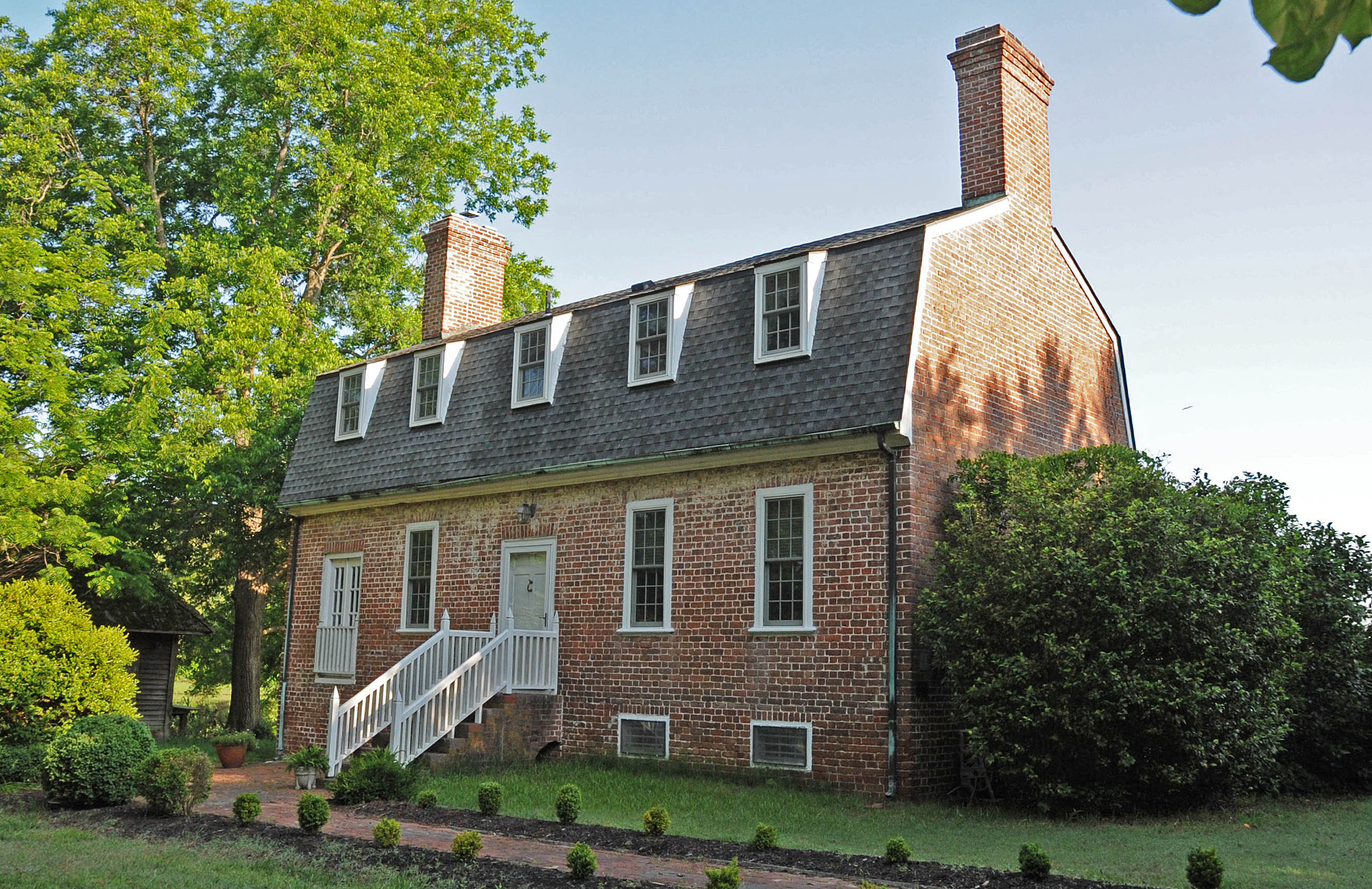

- Location within Virginia Location within the United States
- Location: 3425 S. Crestline Dr., Virginia Beach, Virginia
- Coordinates: 36°49′40″N 76°12′49″W
- Area: 2 acres (0.81 ha)
- Built: 1791
- Architect: Isaac Murray
- Architectural style: Colonial
- NRHP reference No.: 04000482
- VLR No.: 134-0022

Significant dates
- Added to NRHP: May 19, 2004
- Designated VLR: March 17, 2004

The Thomas Murray House is a colonial home situated on the Eastern Branch Elizabeth River at Virginia Beach, Virginia. The house was constructed in 1791 by Isaac Murray for his son, Thomas. The house was saved from being demolished in the 1950s and restored to its original elegance. The house features a dated brick on the top of the eastern chimney with the initials "I.M" (for Isaac Murray) and the date of "1791". The house was built with a central floor plan. A Recreation "Smokehouse" and "carriage house" were added to the property in 1988. The property has the original working well. Across the River the Richard Murray house is visible. The Thomas Murray house was the only Murray house built on the Eastern Branch Elizabeth River.

The Murrays were a prominent family of Princess Anne County. The first Murray, David, came as an indentured servant in 1622, earning 650 acres which were then passed down to later generations of Murrays. The Murrays grew flax as a cash crop and prepared flax fiber for rope making. The original flax drying shed is still on the Richard Murray property today.

It was added to the National Register of Historic Places in 2004.
