= William McMurray (engineer) =

Electrical engineer and inventor with 23 patents

William McMurray (1929–2006) was a pioneer in the field of power electronics. Holding both British and American citizenship, he was an electrical engineer, author and inventor who held 23 patents, and was most notable for his invention of the McMurray inverter and the McMurray-Bedford inverter. According to Bimal Bose of the University of Tennessee McMurray "was not only the Father of Power Electronics but was the greatest man of all ages in power electronics.” (Note: Steigerwald's Memoriam contains a birthdate typo in the bodytext incorrectly stating 1926 instead of 1929 which is the correct date.)

McMurray was born in Los Angeles in 1929 and spent the early part of his life in the United Kingdom. He gained his bachelor's degree in engineering from Battersea Polytechnic and an MSc from Union College. During his career he was the author of 25 research papers, and the book The Theory and Design of Cycloconverters. His contributions to power electronics are considered "the basis of progress in the arts and sciences." A member of General Electric's research and development team since 1953, McMurray's work focused on a wide range of semiconductor power converters and their controls which included applications involving power conditioners and power supplies, speed drives, HVDC transmission and chopper converters for electric vehicles. McMurray was the recipient of the IEEE Power Electronics 1978 William E. Newell Power Electronics Award.
