= North Carolina Highway 121 =

Highway in North Carolina, United States

North Carolina Highway 121

Route information
- Maintained by NCDOT
- Length: 13.17 mi (21.20 km)

Major junctions
- South end: I-587 near Walstonburg
- US 264 near Walstonburg; US 258 Bus. in Farmville
- North end: NC 43 in Bruce

Location
- Country: United States
- State: North Carolina
- Counties: Greene, Pitt

Highway system
- North Carolina Highway System; Interstate; US; State; Scenic
← NC 120	→ NC 122

North Carolina Highway 121 (NC 121) is a 13.2-mile-long (21.2 km) primary state highway in the U.S. state of North Carolina. The highway travels through a short portion of northern Greene County and western Pitt County between Interstate 587 (I-587) at exit 60 and NC 43 in the unincorporated community of Bruce. Though it is signed as a north–south highway, the overall length of the route travels more east–west.

== Route description ==
NC 121 begins at a partial interchange with I-587, also known as the John P. East Memorial Highway, in northeastern Greene County. The interchange only provides access from I-587 eastbound to NC 121 and from NC 121 southbound to I-587 westbound. This portion of the road is located near the community of Fieldsboro and two and a half miles (4.0 km) northeast of the town of Walstonburg. The road heads southeast and almost immediately comes to an intersection with U.S. Route 264 (US 264). The two highways form a 0.4-mile-long (0.64 km) concurrency near the Greene–Pitt county line. Just before the highway crosses into Pitt County, the concurrency ends and NC 121 heads northeast towards Farmville.

Now in Pitt County, NC 121 travels east across farmlands west of the town limits of Farmville. Upon entering the town, the name of the road becomes West Wilson Street and the highway reaches US 258 Business (US 258 Bus.) at May Boulevard and Turnage Street. Another concurrency is formed as the two routes travel along West Wilson Street to the central business district of Farmville. At the intersection of Wilson and Main streets, US 258 Bus. heads southwest along South Main Street while NC 121 heads northeast along North Main Street; East Wilson Street continues southeast as an unnumbered road. NC 121 exits the town and passes over US 258 and US 264 without an interchange. Farmland and small homes line the highway as it passes through the communities of Joyners Crossroads and California. After passing through California, NC 121 cuts through farmland with small swaths of forest before it ends at NC 43 in Bruce, a small settlement between Greenville and Falkland.

== History ==
=== Previous designation ===
North Carolina Highway 121
- Location: Richlands–Kinston
- Length: 25 mi (40 km)
- Existed: c. 1930–c. 1935

NC 121 first appeared on North Carolina state transportation maps in 1930, travelling between NC 24 in Richlands and NC 12 south of Kinston. At the time of establishment, the approximately 25 miles (40 km) highway was classified as a graded road. Construction along the roadway in Lenoir and Jones Counties began the same year that NC 121 was established. Construction was completed and the entire highway was paved by 1933. In June 1932, the American Association of State Highway Officials (AASHO) approved the routing of US 258 which was run concurrently with NC 121 between Richlands and Kinston. By 1935, NC 121 was eliminated from its entire route.

=== Current designation ===
The current designation of NC 121 first on state transportation maps in 1940, running northeast between US 264 in Farmville to NC 43 in Bruce. At the time of establishment, the highway was 8-mile-long (13 km) and was completely paved. The routing remained the same until July 1988, when NC 121 was extended west. From its former terminus, NC 121 replaced US 264A to US 264, where it shared a brief concurrency. The highway then extended west to NC 91 northeast of Walstonburg. In 1992, US 264 Alternate replaced US 264 along the concurrency west of Farmville. In 1999, the western terminus of NC 121 was shifted from NC 91 to US 264 northwest of Farmville. The former alignment became part of US 264 Alternate. In 2022, I-587 replaced US 264 in the vicinity of Farmville and US 264 was shifted to replace US 264 Alternate, reestablishing a concurrency between US 264 and NC 121.

== Junction list ==
County	Location	mi	km	Destinations	Notes
Greene		0.00– 0.38	0.00– 0.61	I-587 west (John P. East Memorial Highway) – Wilson	Exit 60 (I-587); exit from I-587 eastbound / entrance to I-587 westbound only
Greene		0.67	1.08	US 264 west	Southern end of US 264 concurrency
Greene		1.10	1.77	US 264 east	Northern end of US 264 concurrency
Pitt	Farmville	4.56	7.34	US 258 Bus. north (May Boulevard) / Turnage Street – Fountain	Southern end of US 258 Bus. concurrency
Pitt	Farmville	5.04	8.11	US 258 Bus. south (South Main Street) / East Wilson Street – Snow Hill	Northern end of US 258 Bus. concurrency
Pitt	Bruce	13.17	21.20	NC 43 – Greenville, Falkland	
1.000 mi = 1.609 km; 1.000 km = 0.621 mi: Concurrency terminus; Incomplete access
