= North Carolina Highway 91 =

State highway in Greene County, North Carolina, US

North Carolina Highway 91

Route information
- Maintained by NCDOT
- Length: 11.9 mi (19.2 km)
- Existed: 1947–present

Major junctions
- South end: US 13 / US 258 / NC 903 near Snow Hill
- US 264 in Walstonburg
- North end: I-587 near Walstonburg

Location
- Country: United States
- State: North Carolina
- Counties: Greene

Highway system
- North Carolina Highway System; Interstate; US; State; Scenic
| ← NC 90 | → NC 92 |

North Carolina Highway 91 (NC 91) is a primary state highway in the U.S. state of North Carolina running from US 13, US 258, and NC 903 in Snow Hill to I-587 near Walstonburg, entirely in Greene County.

== Route description ==
NC 91 begins at an intersection with US 13/US 258/NC 903 north of the main business district of Snow Hill. The highway immediately heads north into a rural area of eastern North Carolina. Many farms and forests are present along the first several miles of the highway, along with Lenoir Community College and Greene Central High School. After crossing Washington Branch Church Road, NC 91 passes by several industrial farms. Running through the unincorporated community of Castoria, the highway passes a fire station and several small homes before turning to the northwest. Roughly paralleling Sandy Run, the highway continues through a rural area, however more houses are located adjacent to the road, than the section near Snow Hill. Approaching Evermay Farm Road, the highway turns to the north and then slightly northeast. The road turns back to the north before intersecting Fields Road. NC 91 enters Walstonburg along Wilson Street. In the central part of the town, Wilson Street crosses a railroad operated by Carolina Coastal Railway. The highway passes by several small businesses and a post office, before leaving the town to the north. The highway passes by several industrial manufacturers and a fire station between Walstonburg and US 264. Approaching US 264, several small neighborhoods appear adjacent to the highway. Once reaching US 264, the highway turns right to follow the highway to the east. The two highways follow concurrently for 0.8-mile (1.3 km) until NC 91 splits to the north. For the final section of NC 91, the highway follows along Bell Road. The adjacent land is primarily forests, and several swamps are located. NC 91 ends at an interchange with I-587 at its exit 59, north of Walstonburg.

== History ==
=== Previous designation ===
North Carolina Highway 91
- Location: Durham–Engelhard, NC
- Length: 206 mi (332 km)
- Existed: c. 1922–c. 1941

Plans submitted by North Carolina in 1916 and 1918 for a state highway program as part of the Federal-aid highway program, showed a route linking Wilson and Washington travelling through Greenville. In 1918, only a section of this proposed highway east of Greenville was considered an improved roadway. Upon the establishment of the North Carolina state highway system in 1921, this corridor was assigned to NC 91. When it first appeared on the 1922 North Carolina state transportation map, the western terminus of NC 91 was located at NC 90 in Wendell. The highway travelled southeast through Johnston, Nash, and Wilson Counties to Wilson, where it met NC 40. NC 91 then continued east through Farmville and Greenville until meeting NC 30 in Chocowinity. NC 30 and NC 91 follow a concurrency northeast to Washington, where NC 91 diverged and ran east to Pantego. The highway then ran south to Belhaven and then southeast, ending in Swanquarter.

The road condition of NC 91 varied greatly by 1924. NC 91 in Wake County was a topsoil, sand–clay, and gravel road. Throughout all of Johnston and Nash County, it was considered a graded roadway. From the Nash County–Wilson County line to Wilson, NC 91 was a topsoil, sand–clay, and gravel road. A section of the highway east of Wilson was paved but the highway returned to a topsoil, sand–clay and gravel roadway at an undefined point in eastern Wilson County. At the Wilson County–Greene County line, NC 91 became a graded roadway and remained as such throughout Greene County. It then became an unimproved roadway between the Greene County–Pitt County line and Farmville. NC 91 was paved between Farmville and Greenville and then became a sand–clay and gravel roadway between Greenville and Grimesland. The highway was paved between Grimesland and an undefined area east of Jessama in Beaufort County where it became a graded road through Pantego. Between Pantego and an undefined area of east of Belhaven, NC 91 was paved. It then returned to a sand–clay and gravel roadway for the remainder of its route to Swanquarter.

By 1926, NC 91 was rerouted in Beaufort County. As it originally followed a direct route between Leechville and Swanquarter, the new routing ran alongside the Pungo River through Scranton. In 1926, the western terminus of NC 91 was adjusted from NC 90 in Wendell to NC 90 in Zebulon. As a result, the highway also followed a new routing between Zebulon and Middlesex, with the former alignment becoming a secondary road. In addition, much of NC 91 was paved by 1926, including the entire route in Wake County, a segment between the Nash County Wilson County line and an undefined region west of Leechville, and a segment between Leechville and Swanquarter. The segment in Johnston and Nash County remained a graded road, while the segment west of Leechville remained a sand–clay and gravel roadway. The entire highway was paved by 1929.

By 1930, both the western and eastern termini of NC 91 were moved. The western terminus was moved from NC 90 in Wendell to US 15 and NC 75 in Durham. From Durham the highway travelled east along a paved roadway to Wake Forest. It then ran southeast along a sand–clay and gravel roadway through Rolesville to Zebulon. The eastern terminus was extended from Swanquarter to Engelhard. It followed a graded roadway to the northeast, along the southern shoreline of Lake Mattamuskeet from Swanquarter to Engelhard. In 1932, the establishment of US 264 was approved by the American Association of State Highway Officials (AASHO), running along NC 91 from Zebulon to Englehard. NC 91 was truncated on its eastern end to Zebulon by 1935, eliminated its concurrency with US 264. By 1940, NC 91 was relocated between Wake Forest and Zebulon. It followed Wait Avenue east of Wake Forest to modern-day NC 96, and then followed modern-day NC 96 to Zebulon. NC 91 was removed by 1941 and replaced by NC 264.

=== Current designation ===
The current designation of NC 91 first appeared on the 1948 North Carolina state transportation map, travelling from US 258 and NC 102 north of Snow Hill to US 264 north of Walstonburg. By 1958, the highway was rerouted near its southern terminus to run directly to Snow Hill instead of using its previous alignment which ended north of the town. In 1961, NC 91 was extended south to a new southern terminus at US 70 Business, US 258 Business, and NC 11 Business in Kinston. It replaced the former alignment of US 258 between the two communities. In October 1969, the southern terminus of NC 91 was truncated to US 13 and US 258 north of Snow Hill. The route south to Kinston became part of NC 58. In August 1986, the northern terminus of NC 91 was extended west to US 264 and NC 58 in Wilson. The new alignment of NC 91 ran completely concurrent with US 264. In 1988, US 264 was removed from its concurrency with NC 91 and was placed onto a new freeway. This segment later became part of US 264 Alternate between 1988 and 1999. NC 91 was removed from its routing along US 264 Alternate between Walstonburg and Wilson in 1999. Instead, it was rerouted to follow US 264 Alternate east for 0.8 miles (1.3 km) and the ran north to US 264. In 2022, I-587 replaced US 264 along the freeway at the northern terminus of NC 91. US 264 was subsequently moved to replace US 264 Alternate, reestablishing a concurrency between US 264 and NC 91.

== Major intersections ==
The entire route is in Greene County.

| Location | mi | km | Destinations | Notes |
|---|---|---|---|---|
| | 0.0 | 0.0 | US 13 / US 258 / NC 903 – Farmville, Goldsboro | |
| Walstonburg | 10.7 | 17.2 | US 264 west – Wilson | Western end of US 264 concurrency |
| | 11.6 | 18.7 | US 264 east – Farmville | Eastern end of US 264 concurrency |
| | 12.3 | 19.8 | I-587 – Wilson, Farmville | Exit 59 (I-587) |
1.000 mi = 1.609 km; 1.000 km = 0.621 mi: Concurrency terminus
