= NC91 =

NC91 may refer to one of the following topics:

- ECU Health Medical Center helipad (FAA LID)
- North Carolina Highway 91
