= Roy Spencer (baseball) =

American baseball player (1900–1973)

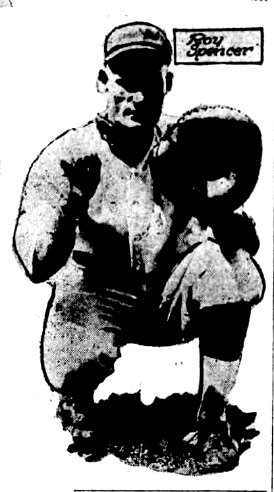
- Catcher
- Born: February 22, 1900; Scranton, North Carolina, U.S.
- Died: February 8, 1973 (aged 72); Port Charlotte, Florida, U.S.
- Batted: Right Threw: Right

MLB debut
- April 19, 1925, for the Pittsburgh Pirates

Last MLB appearance
- May 9, 1938, for the Brooklyn Dodgers

MLB statistics
- Batting average: .247
- Home runs: 3
- Runs batted in: 203
- Stats at Baseball Reference

Teams
- Pittsburgh Pirates (1925–1927); Washington Senators (1929–1932); Cleveland Indians (1933–1934); New York Giants (1936); Brooklyn Dodgers (1937–1938)

Roy Hampton Spencer (February 22, 1900 – February 8, 1973) was an American professional baseball catcher. He played fourteen seasons in Major League Baseball (MLB) from 1925 to 1938 for the Pittsburgh Pirates, Washington Senators, Cleveland Indians, New York Giants, and Brooklyn Dodgers.

He helped the Pirates win the 1925 World Series and the 1927 National League Pennant and the Giants win the 1936 NL Pennant.

In 12 seasons he played in 636 Games and had 1,814 At Bats, 177 Runs, 448 Hits, 57 Doubles, 13 Triples, 3 Home Runs, 203 RBI, 4 Stolen Bases, 128 Walks, .247 Batting Average, .301 On-base percentage, .298 Slugging Percentage, 540 Total Bases and 42 Sacrifice Hits. Defensively, he recorded a .984 fielding percentage.

He died in Port Charlotte, Florida at the age of 72.

== Sources ==
- Career statistics from Baseball Reference · Baseball Reference (Minors) · Retrosheet · Baseball Almanac
