= Interstate 587 (North Carolina) =

Interstate Highway in North Carolina

Interstate 587
- I-587 highlighted in red; Future I-587 highlighted in blue

Route information
- Auxiliary route of I-87
- Maintained by NCDOT
- Length: 37.08 mi (59.67 km)
- Existed: June 22, 2022–present
- NHS: Entire route

Major junctions
- West end: I-95 / I-795 / US 264 near Wilson
- I-795 near Wilson; US 301 in Wilson; US 264 / US 264 Alt. near Saratoga; US 258 / US 258 Bus. in Farmville
- East end: US 264 / NC 11 Byp. in Greenville

Location
- Country: United States
- State: North Carolina
- Counties: Wilson, Greene, Pitt

Highway system
- Interstate Highway System; Main; Auxiliary; Suffixed; Business; Future; North Carolina Highway System; Interstate; US; State; Scenic
← NC 581	→ US 601

Interstate 587 (I-587) is a 37.07-mile (59.66 km) auxiliary Interstate Highway in the US state of North Carolina. The western terminus of the highway is at I-95, I-795, and US Highway 264 (US 264) near Wilson. The highway runs concurrently with I-795 and US 264 around the southern side of Wilson. I-795 diverges toward Goldsboro 4.4 miles (7.1 km) east of I-95. The eastern end of the US 264 overlap is located northwest of Saratoga. I-587 continues traveling east, bypassing Saratoga and Farmville to the north. The eastern terminus of I-587 is located at US 264 and North Carolina Highway 11 Bypass (NC 11 Byp.) in western Greenville. I-587 is a spur of the North Carolina segment of I-87 which runs from Raleigh to Wendell. As of 2026, I-587 does not connect with its parent route.

On establishment of the North Carolina Highway System, the primary route between Wilson and Greenville was NC 91. US 264 was signed along the route in 1932 and NC 91 was decommissioned. Over the years, US 264 was improved, and in 1992, a freeway was completed between I-95 in Wilson and Greenville. In January 2013, the mayors of Greenville, Ayden, and Kinston began a political push for an Interstate designation between Greenville and I-95. On November 14, 2016, the American Association of State Highway and Transportation Officials (AASHTO) designated the highway as the Future I-587 corridor. On May 10, 2021, the highway was officially established from I-95 in Wilson to US 264/NC 11 Byp. in Greenville and was signed in June 2022. In the future, I-587 will extend west to I-87 and US 64 in Zebulon.

== Route description ==
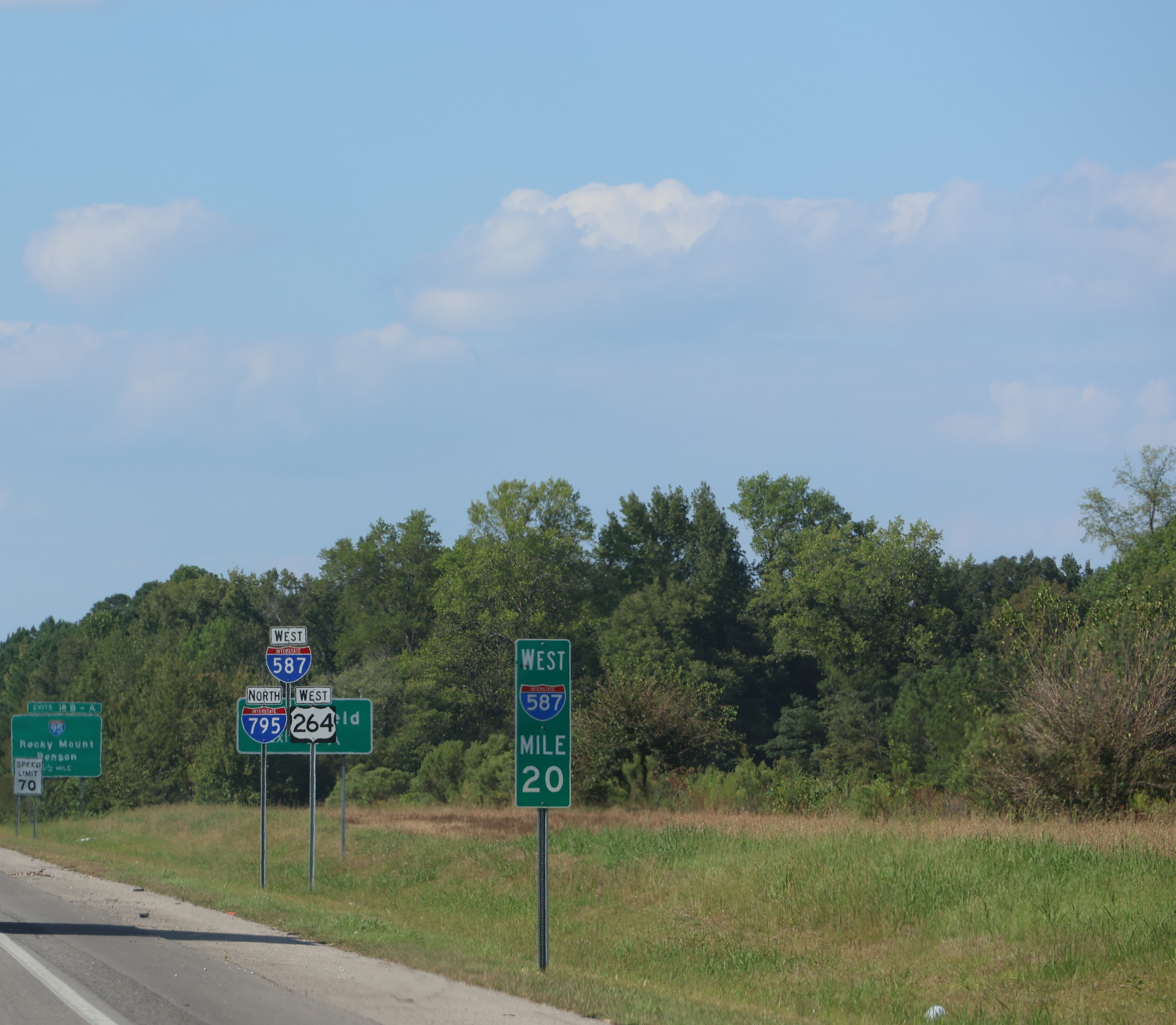
I-587/I-795/US 264 shields and an I-587 mile marker in Wilson County, September 2023

I-587 begins at an interchange between I-95 and I-795 and US 264 southwest of Wilson. US 264 extends west to Raleigh, while the interchange marks the northern terminus of I-795. I-587, I-795, and US 264 travel east around southern Wilson. The concurrency with I-795 ends 4.4 miles (7.1 km) east of I-95 at an interchange. At the interchange, I-795 turns south toward Goldsboro. Immediately following the I-795 interchange, I-587 and US 264 interchange with US 301 which provides access to the northern terminus of US 117. I-587 and US 264 continue east, looping around Wilson. The highways intersect NC 58 southeast of Wilson, which is followed by an S-curve in the freeway.

An interchange with US 264 and US 264 Alternate follows the S-curve, marking the eastern end of the US 264 concurrency. I-587 continues east around the town of Saratoga. As it loops around Saratoga, I-587 is repositioned to the southeast, largely paralleling US 264. I-587 begins an easterly turn north of Walstonburg and interchanges with NC 91 and US 264, before completing the curve west of Farmville. As I-587 continues north around Farmville, it meets US 258 and US 258 Business (US 258 Bus.) at an interchange northwest of downtown. US 258 follows I-587 to the east for 2.8 miles (4.5 km) before leaving the freeway at another interchange east of downtown Farmville. I-587 continues for another 6.6 miles (10.6 km) through rural North Carolina before intersecting US 264 and NC 11 Byp. west of Greenville. The interchange marks the eastern terminus of I-587. The I-587/I-795 concurrency is one of only three 3-digit interstate concurrencies in the United States; the other two are I-785/I-840 concurrency near Greensboro, North Carolina and the I-271/I-480 concurrency in Ohio.

The North Carolina Department of Transportation (NCDOT) measures average daily traffic volumes along many of the roadways it maintains. In 2016, average daily traffic volumes along I-587 varied from 18,000 vehicles per day west of exit 63 in Pitt County to 34,000 vehicles per day west of exit 43C in Wilson County. I-587 is included with the National Highway System, a network of highways in the US which serve strategic transportation facilities in its entirety.

== History ==
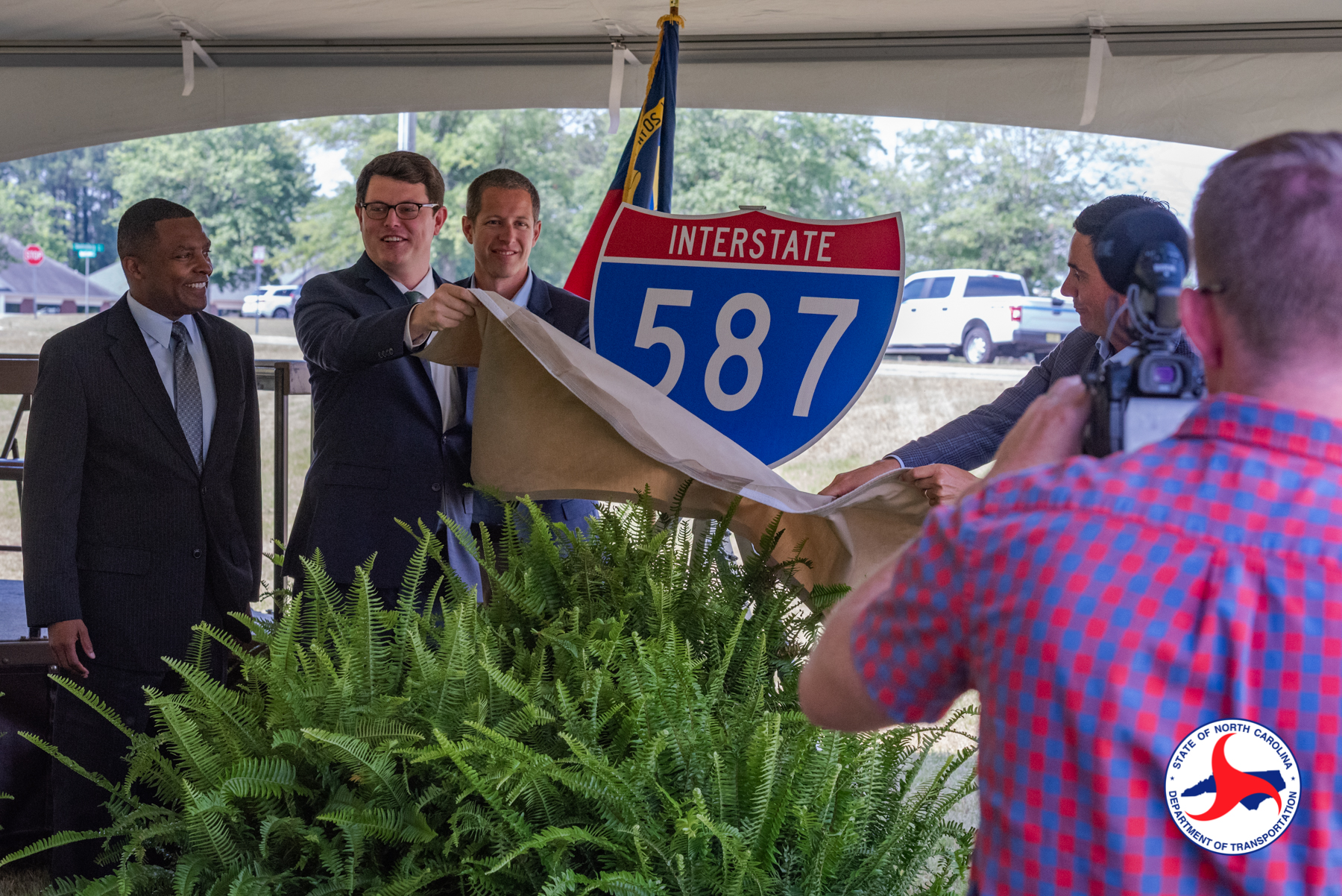
I-587 shield reveal in June 2020

In January 2013, the mayors of Greenville, Kinston, and Ayden announced that they would push to change the designation of US 264 between Wilson and Greenville to an Interstate.

On September 7, 2016, Governor Pat McCrory said he would ask for the section of US 264 between Zebulon and Greenville to be designated an Interstate Highway. The justification for Interstate status was that Greenville was the 10th largest city in the state and had no Interstate connecting it. On November 14, AASHTO approved the Future I-587 designation; followed by Federal Highway Administration (FHWA) approval on November 21. In April 2017, NCDOT began posting Future I-587 signs along the length of the route. On May 10, 2021, AASHTO approved the establishment of I-587, between I-95 and Greenville. This was further approved on November 16, 2021, marking the designation official. Signage for the designation went up on June 20, 2022.

== Future ==
NCDOT intends to extend I-587 west along US 264 from its current western terminus in Wilson to US 64 and US 264 in Zebulon. In addition, the department expects to extend the designation of I-87 northward from its current terminus in Wendell along US 64 toward Norfolk, Virginia. This would provide a connection between I-587 and its parent route. Currently, NCDOT has a timetable to upgrade US 264 between Zebulon and Wilson to Interstate standards between 2025 and 2026.

== Exit list ==
County	Location	mi	km	Old exit	New exit	Destinations	Notes
Wake	Zebulon	17.2	27.7	19	1	US 64 east – Nashville, Rocky Mount	Existing interchanges of US 264 (upgrade to Interstate standards, funded for construction in 2025–2026)
Wake	Zebulon	18.0	29.0	20	2	NC 97 – Zebulon, Oxford	Existing interchanges of US 264 (upgrade to Interstate standards, funded for construction in 2025–2026)
Wake	Zebulon	19.5	31.4	21	3	US 264 Alt. east / NC 39 – Selma, Louisburg	Existing interchanges of US 264 (upgrade to Interstate standards, funded for construction in 2025–2026)
Johnston	No major junctions						
Nash	Middlesex	24.1	38.8	27	7	NC 231 – Middlesex	Existing interchanges of US 264 (upgrade to Interstate standards, funded for construction in 2025–2026)
Nash	Bailey	28.3	45.5	30	11	NC 581 – Bailey, Spring Hope	Existing interchanges of US 264 (upgrade to Interstate standards, funded for construction in 2025–2026)
Wilson	Sims	31.8	51.2	34	14	Green Pond Road – Sims	Existing interchanges of US 264 (upgrade to Interstate standards, funded for construction in 2025–2026)
Wilson		33.7	54.2	36	16	US 264 Alt. – Sims, Wilson	Existing interchanges of US 264 (upgrade to Interstate standards, funded for construction in 2025–2026); signed as exits 16A (west) and 16B (east)
Wilson		0.0	0.0	Route transition from Future I-587 to I-587			
Wilson		0.0	0.0	38	18	I-95 / I-795 begins / US 264 west – Benson, Rocky Mount	Western terminus of I-587; northern terminus of I-795; western end of I-795 and US 264 overlap; signed as exits 18B (south) and 18A (north); cloverleaf interchange with collector/distributor lanes; I-95 exit 119
Wilson		1.8	2.9	40	20	NC 42 – Wilson, Clayton	
Wilson		3.5	5.6	42	22	Downing Street – Wilson	
Wilson		4.5	7.2	43	23	I-795 south – Goldsboro, Kenly	Eastern end of I-795 overlap; eastbound exit and westbound entrance
Wilson	Wilson	5.2	8.4	43	24	US 301 to I-795 / US 117 south – Wilson	Signed as exits 24A (south) and 24B (north)
Wilson	Wilson	7.9	12.7	46	26	Black Creek Road	
Wilson		9.5	15.3	47	28	Old Stantonburg Road	
Wilson		10.7	17.2	49	29	NC 58 – Wilson, Kinston	
Wilson		14.1	22.7	51	32	US 264 east / US 264 Alt. west – Wilson, Saratoga	Eastern end of US 264 overlap
Wilson		16.5	26.6	53	35	NC 111 / NC 222 – Saratoga, Fountain	
Greene		22.7	36.5	59	41	NC 91 – Walstonburg, Snow Hill	Northern terminus of NC 91
Greene		23.6	38.0	60	42	NC 121 north – Farmville	Southern terminus of NC 121; eastbound exit and westbound entrance
Pitt	Farmville	26.8	43.1	63	45	US 258 north / US 258 Bus. south – Tarboro, Farmville	Western end of US 258 overlap
Pitt	Farmville	30.1	48.4	66	48	US 258 south (Wesley Church Road)	Eastern end of US 258 overlap
Pitt	Greenville	34.5	55.5	71	53	Mozingo Road	
Pitt	Greenville	37.0	59.5	73	56	US 264 / NC 11 Byp. – Kinston, Washington	Eastern terminus; signed as exits 56A (east) and 56B (west)
Pitt	Greenville	37.0	59.5	—	—	Stantonsburg Road – Greenville Downtown	Continuation as Stantonsburg Road
1.000 mi = 1.609 km; 1.000 km = 0.621 mi: Concurrency terminus; Incomplete access
