= U.S. Route 264 =

Highway in the United States

U.S. Highway 264
- US 264 in red, US 264 Alt. in blue, US 264 Bus. in Belhaven in pink

Route information
- Auxiliary route of US 64
- Maintained by NCDOT
- Length: 215.7 mi (347.1 km)
- Existed: 1932–present
- Tourist routes: Pamlico Scenic Byway

Major junctions
- West end: I-87 / I-440 / US 64 / US 64 Bus. in Raleigh
- I-540 near Knightdale; US 64 near Zebulon; I-95 / I-587 / I-795 near Wilson; I-587 in Greenville; US 13 in Greenville; US 17 in Washington
- East end: US 64 in Manns Harbor

Location
- Country: United States
- State: North Carolina
- Counties: Wake, Johnston, Nash, Wilson, Greene, Pitt, Beaufort, Hyde, Dare

Highway system
- United States Numbered Highway System; List; Special; Divided; North Carolina Highway System; Interstate; US; State; Scenic
← NC 261	→ NC 268

U.S. Route 264 (US 264) is an east–west United States Highway located completely within the U.S. state of North Carolina, being an auxiliary route of US 64. Its western terminus is located at Interstate 87 (I-87), I-440, and US 64 in Raleigh. US 264 is a freeway between Raleigh and Wilson, with segments running concurrently with I-87, I-587, I-795, and US 64. The highway is largely parallel to I-587 between Wilson and Greenville and primarily serves smaller communities such as Saratoga and Farmville. East of Greenville, US 264 connects the municipalities of Washington, Belhaven, Swan Quarter, and Engelhard. The eastern terminus of US 264 is located at US 64 in Manns Harbor. US 264 is 215.7 miles (347.1 km) in is duration.

Prior to the establishment of US 264, North Carolina Highway 91 (NC 91) ran along the general corridor between Zebulon and Engelhard. In 1932, the American Association of State Highway Officials (AASHO) approved the establishment of US 264 between Zebulon and Engelhard, running concurrently with NC 91. By 1935, the eastern terminus of NC 91 was truncated to Zebulon, removing the concurrency with US 264. US 264 was extended east to Nags Head by 1951, running along its own routing between Engelhard and Manns Harbor and concurrently with US 64 from Manns Harbor to Nags Head. In response to the regional shifts in Eastern North Carolina, updates to US 264 have been gradually made, including the creation of a freeway between Zebulon and Greenville. The freeway was completed by 2006, with the final segment connecting to the Raleigh Beltline. US 264 was extended west from Zebulon to Raleigh in 1997, with the new routing completely concurrent with US 64. In 2021, I-587 was established traversing US 264 freeway between I-95 in Wilson and US 264 and NC 11 Bypass in Greenville. US 264 was subsequently removed from the freeway between Wilson and Greenville and was placed along portions of its old routing and a concurrency with NC 11 Bypass.

== Route description ==
=== Raleigh to Wilson ===
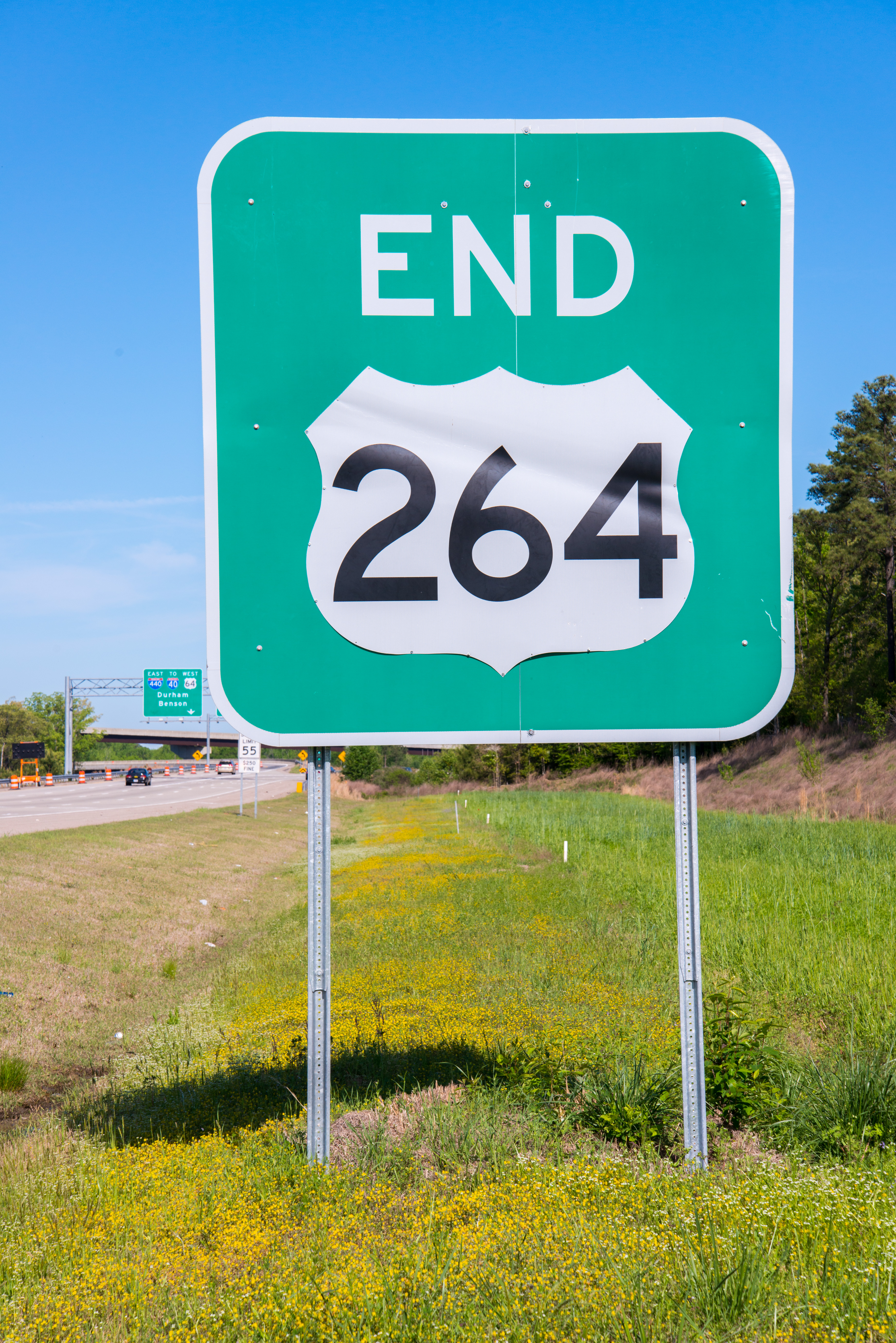
A sign indicating the western terminus of US 264 in Raleigh

The western terminus of US 264 is located at an interchange with I-87, I-440, and US 64 in Raleigh. Beyond the interchange, I-87, I-440, and US 64 travel south and west toward I-40, while I-440 travels north and west toward US 1. US 264 travels east concurrently with I-87 and US 64 along a freeway. The highways interchange with New Hope Road (exit 4) before crossing Crabtree Creek and the Neuse River. I-87, US 64, and US 264 continue east, meeting Hodge Road at exit 6 and the eastern terminus of I-540 at exit 7. Beyond the interchange with I-540, the freeway travels to the south of Knightdale. Interchanges with Smithfield Road, Wendell Falls Parkway, and US 64 Business provide access to the town. The freeway briefly turns to the northeast between Smithfield Road and US 64 Business, but turns back to the east.

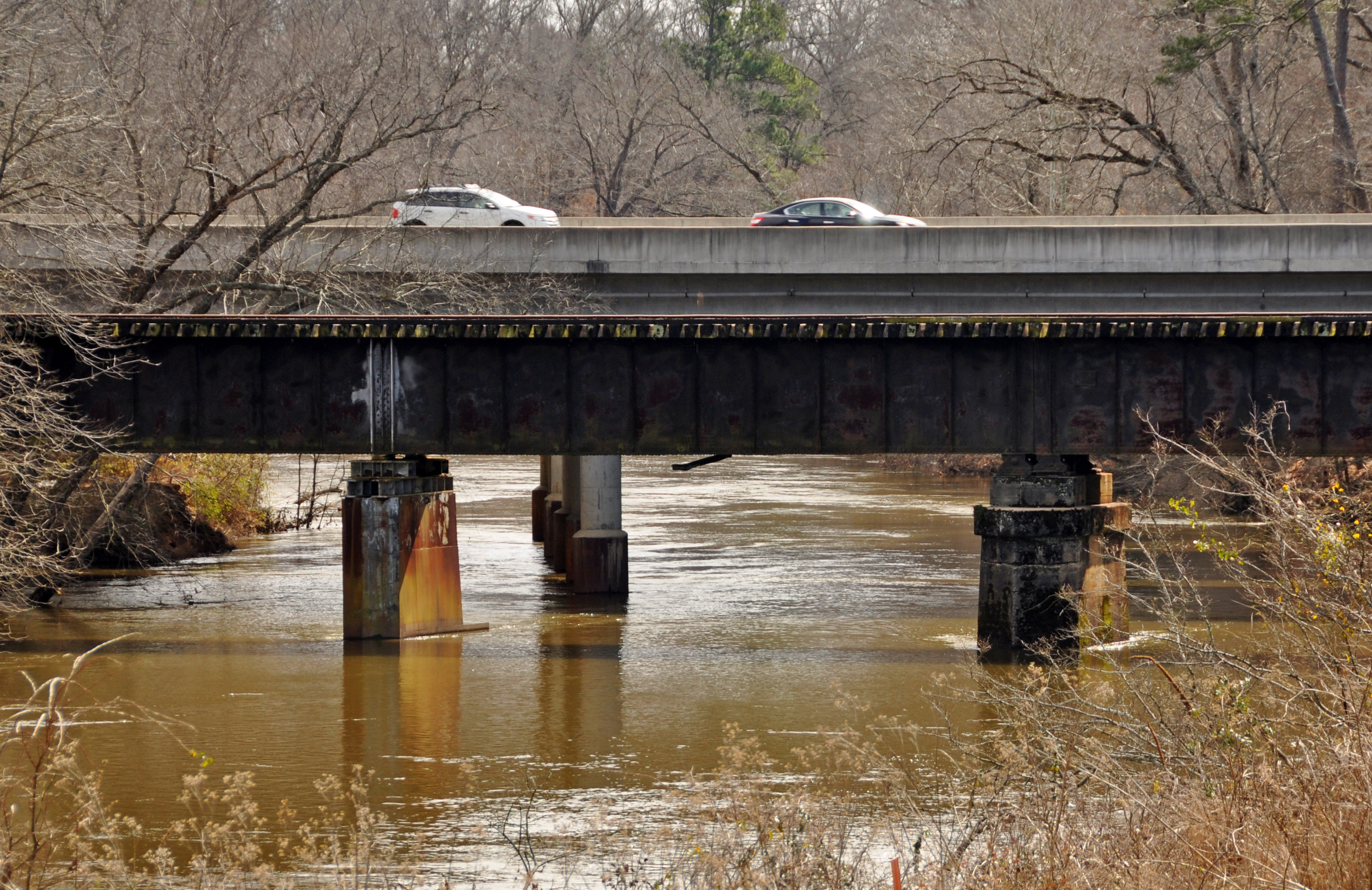
I-87, US 64, and US 264 crossing the Neuse River in Wake County

I-87 ends at an interchange with Rolesville Road northwest of Wendell. US 64 and US 264 travel to the north of Wendell and Lizard Lick paralleling North Carolina Highway 97 (NC 97). The highway enters northern Zebulon from the west, and meets NC 96 at an interchange, before diverging from US 64 and travelling to the southeast. US 264 travels along the northern limits of Zebulon until meeting NC 97 at an interchange. East of the interchange, the highway leaves the town limits of Zebulon and travels southeast through rural Wake County. It meets US 264 Alternate and NC 39 at a diamond interchange near Five County Stadium. US 264 continues southeast for 0.7 miles (1.1 km) until leaving Wake County, briefly entering Johnston County, and then entering Nash County.

Continuing into rural Nash County, US 264 largely parallels US 264 Alternate, located to its south. The highway travels to the north of Middlesex and meets NC 231 at an interchange north of the town. US 264 then crosses Turkey Creek and Big Branch before running north of Bailey where it meets NC 581. Approximately three miles (four point eight kilometres) east of NC 581, US 264 leaves Nash County and enters into Wilson County. The highway meets Green Pond Road one-half mile (zero point eight zero kilometres) east of the Nash County–Wilson County line. US 264 travels north of Sims before turning further to the southeast and meeting US 264 Alternate at a partial cloverleaf interchange. The highway then crosses over a railroad owned and operated by the Carolina Coastal Railway before meeting I-95, I-587, and I-795 at a cloverleaf interchange.

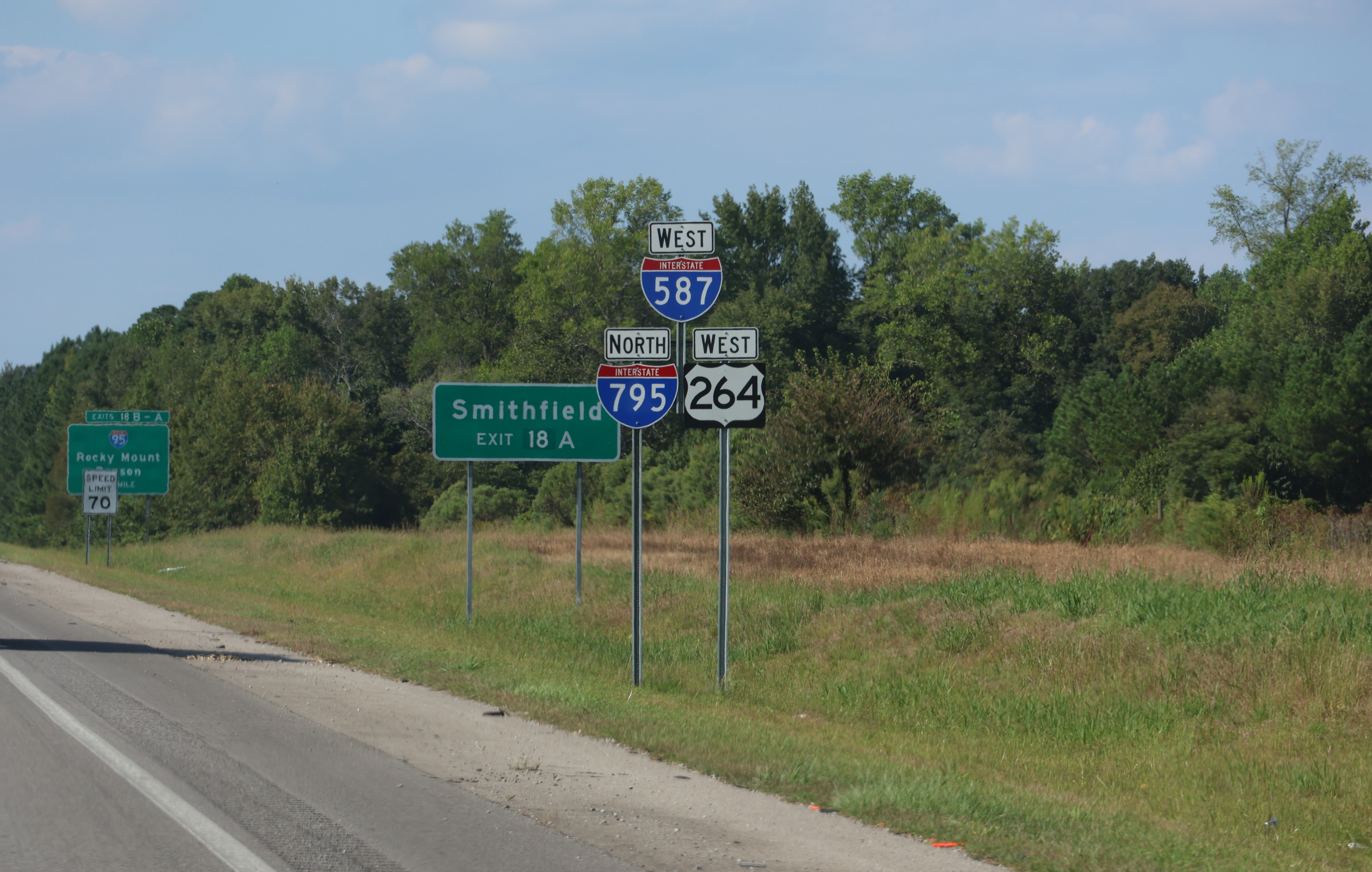
I-587/I-795/US 264 shields in Wilson County, September 2023

I-587 and I-795 run concurrently with US 264 to the east. The highways travel along the western side of Wilson and have interchanges with NC 42 and Downing Road. I-795 diverges to the south towards Goldsboro at exit 43C. The incomplete interchange only has access to I-795 south from I-587 east and US 264 east, while traffic along I-795 north can only access I-587 west and US 264 west at exit 43C. A nearby interchange with US 301 provides further access to I-795 and to the northern terminus of US 117. I-587 and US 264 turn to follow an easterly direction before crossing over two railroads owned and operated by CSX Transportation. The highways meet Black Creek Road, Old Stantonsburg Road, and NC 58 at interchanges south of Wilson. Additionally, I-587 and US 264 cross over the Carolina Coastal Railway between Old Stantonsburg Road and NC 58. Beyond NC 58, the freeway makes an s-shaped curve before reaching a diamond interchange between Wilson and Saratoga. US 264 exits the freeway at the interchange and turns to the southeast toward Saratoga. The eastern terminus of US 264 Alternate is also located at the interchange.

=== Wilson to Washington ===
From I-587, US 264 travels through rural Wilson County for 1.7 miles (2.7 km) until reaching the town limits of Saratoga and picking up the name Main Street. In the center of the town, US 264 intersects NC 111 and NC 222. US 264 continues southeast, leaving the town limits southeast of Shackleford Street. The highway continues through rural Wilson County for 2.4 miles (3.9 km) before crossing into Greene County. As it approaches Walstonburg, US 264 turns to the east and intersects NC 91 north of the town. The highways travel concurrently for 0.8 miles (1.3 km) before NC 91 turns to the north toward I-587. US 264 continues for 2.4 miles (3.9 km) until intersecting NC 121 west of Farmville. At the intersection, US 264 turns southeast to run concurrently along NC 121 for approximately one-half mile (zero point eight zero kilometres). NC 121 then turns to follow Wilson Street towards Farmville while US 264 continues southeast and enters into Pitt County. The highway crosses the Carolina Coastal Railway at an at-grade crossing and begins to run along the southern limits of Farmville. At Main Street, US 264 intersects US 258 and US 258 Business. US 258 follows concurrently with US 264 for approximately one-half mile (zero point eight zero kilometres) until turning to the northeast along Wesley Church Road.

Leaving Farmville to the southeast, US 264 travels for approximately 3.4 miles (5.5 km) southeast of US 258 before intersecting US 13. At the intersection, US 13 and US 264 begin running concurrently towards Greenville. The route turns to the northeast and crosses over Little Contentnea Creek before reaching NC 11 Bypass at a diamond interchange (NC 11 Bypass exit 119). At the interchange, US 264 turns to run concurrently along NC 11 Bypass to the north. US 264 and NC 11 Bypass meet I-587 and Stantonsburg Road at exit 73, a cloverleaf interchange. The highways continue north, meeting NC 43 at a diamond interchange and then crossing over the Tar River. North of the river, US 264 and NC 11 Bypass meet NC 33 at a diamond interchange and then turn to the east. US 264 meets US 13, NC 11, and NC 903 at a partial cloverleaf interchange, marking the northern terminus of NC 11 Bypass and the end of the freeway. The highway continues as a non-controlled access divided highway through an industrial area of Greenville. It turns to the southeast and continues straight for approximately 1.8 miles (2.9 km) before turning to the south. US 264 then intersects US 264 Alternate and NC 33 at Pactolus Highway. US 264 turns to the east at the intersection travelling along a non-controlled access divided highway which somewhat parallels the Tar River.

As US 264 continues east on Pactolus Highway, it leaves the city of Greenville and reenters rural Pitt County. It passes to the south of Pactolus and intersects the southern terminus of NC 30 east of the community. US 264 then turns to the south and travels approximately 4 miles (6.4 km) east of NC 30 until crossing Tranters Creek, a tributary of the Tar River, and entering Beaufort County. The highway continues southeast and enters Washington from the northwest, picking up the name 5th Street. US 264 meets US 17 at a diamond interchange northwest of downtown Washington. It continues southeast along 5th Street and intersects US 17 Business and the western terminus of NC 92 at Bridge Street. US 264 and NC 92 run concurrently along Bridge Street to the southeast. The highway turns to the northeast west of an intersection with Harvey Street, and changes names to John Small Avenue at an intersection with 5th Street. It then turns to the east near Highland Drive, crosses Runyon Creek, and leaves Washington to the east.

=== Washington to Manns Harbor ===
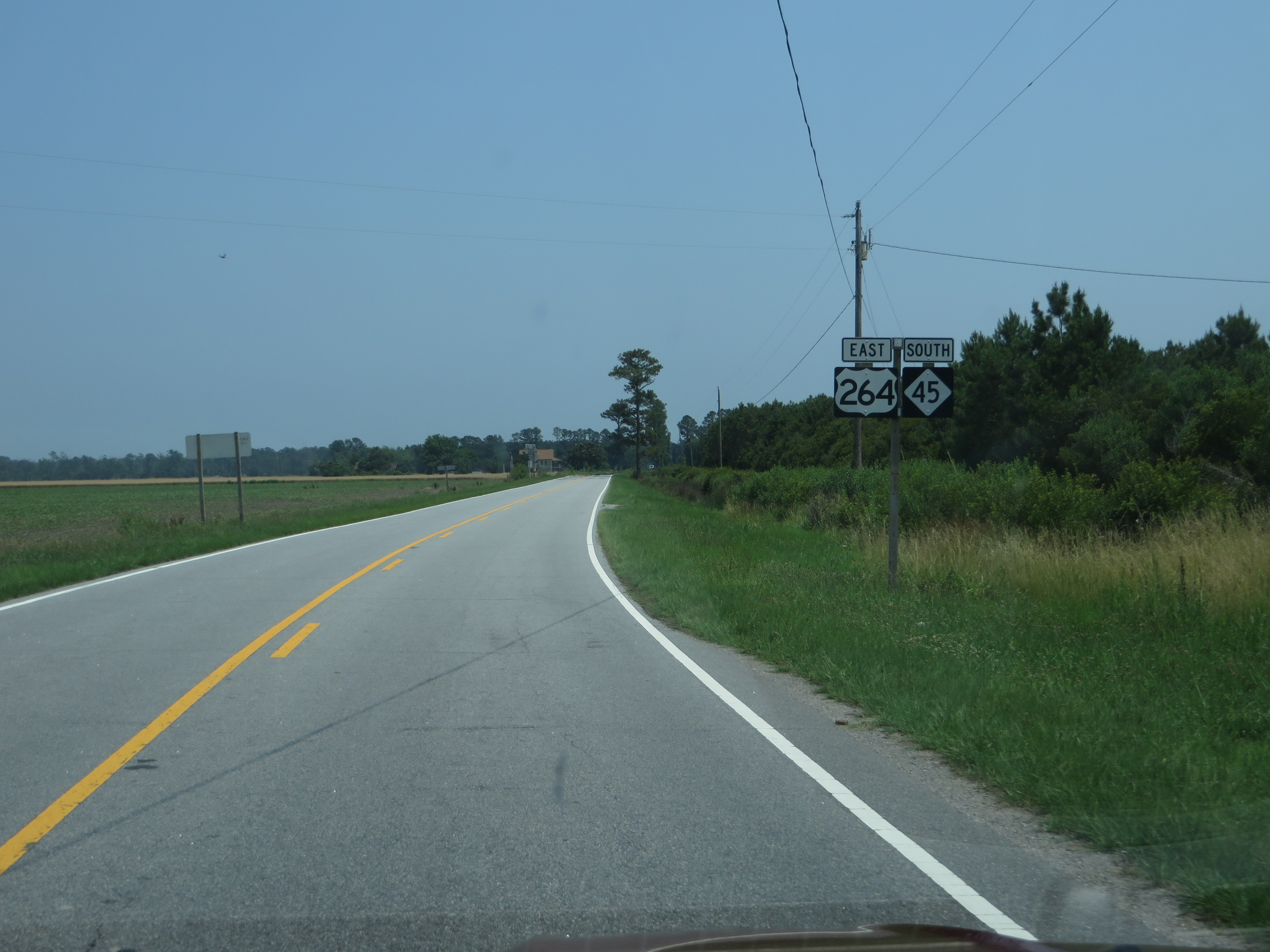
US 264 and NC 45 running concurrently through rural Hyde County

US 264 and NC 92 continue to travel east from Washington through an exurban area of Beaufort County. The highways intersect NC 32 in the community of Bunyan and then enter a rural area. Approximately 2.8 miles (4.5 km) east of Bunyan, NC 92 splits from US 264 and continues southeast towards Bath. US 264 turns to the northeast near the NC 92 intersection but soon returns to an easterly orientation. The highway continues to travel east through rural Beaufort County, crossing Tankard Creek and Pungo Creek. East of the Pungo Creek crossing, US 264 turns toward Pantego following a northeasterly orientation. US 264 enters Pantego from the southwest where it picks up the name Main Street. The highway crosses a tributary of the Pungo River before intersecting NC 99 at Pungo Road. US 264 and NC 99 begin a concurrency and travel east along Main Street, crossing a branch of the Carolina Coastal Railway at an at-grade crossing. The highways then leave the town and turn to the southeast toward Belhaven, roughly paralleling the railroad. US 264 and NC 99 enter Belhaven from the northwest and pick up the name Main Street. Northwest of downtown Belhaven, US 264 intersects NC 99 and US 264 Business, marking the end of the NC 99 concurrency. At the intersection, US 264 turns to the northeast, bypassing downtown Belhaven. The highway continues east, intersecting US 264 Business once more in a rural area northeast of Belhaven. US 264 continues east for 5.5 miles (8.9 km) until crossing another tributary of the Pungo River and entering into Hyde County.

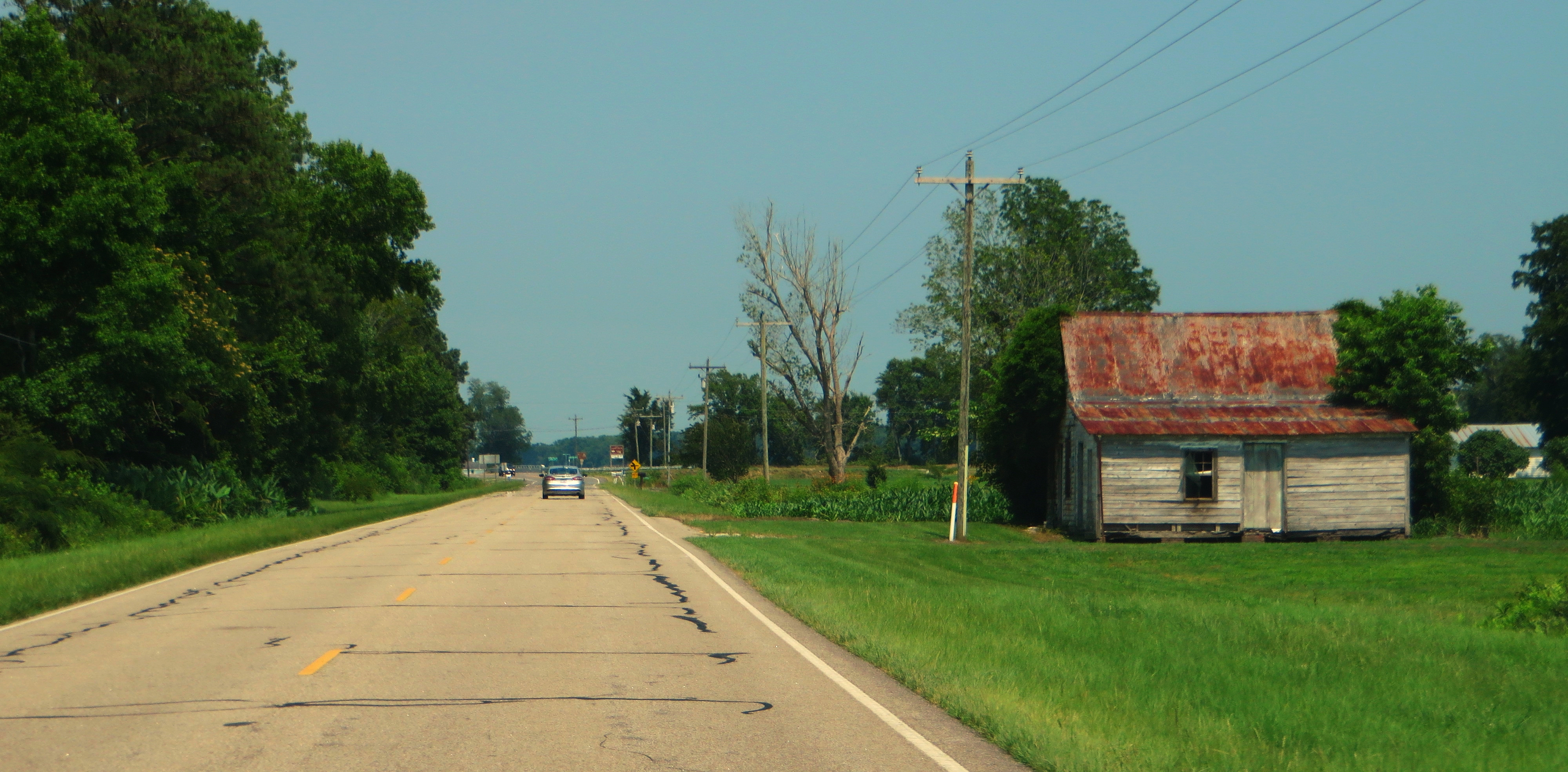
US 264 near Lake Mattamuskeet

After entering Hyde County, US 264 travels for 1.4 miles (2.3 km) until intersecting NC 45. At the intersection, NC 45 turns to follow concurrently with US 264, and the highways begin a turn to the southeast. US 264 and NC 45 continue southeast for 2.4 miles (3.9 km) until turning to the south and crossing the Intracoastal Waterway along the Walter B. Jones Bridge. The highways continue south for approximately seven miles (eleven kilometres) through rural Hyde County passing the community of Scranton to the east. Near Hodges Road, the highways turn to the east and continue for approximately three miles (four point eight kilometres) before turning to the southeast. US 264 and NC 45 continue for another 2.6 miles (4.2 km) until NC 45 diverges from the highway northwest of Swanquarter, marking the end of the US 264 and NC 45 concurrency. The highway turns to the east, bypassing Swanquarter to the north. Northeast of Swanquarter, US 264 intersects NC 94 at Main Street. US 264 and NC 94 run concurrently to the northeast toward Lake Mattamuskeet. As it approaches the lake, the highway turns to follow alongside its southern shoreline. US 264 intersects NC 94 west of New Holland, marking the end of the US 264 and NC 94 concurrency. It then continues northeast through New Holland and Lake Landing toward Engelhard. As it approaches the community, US 264 turns to the east near an intersection with Lake Road. The highway then enters Engelhard from the west and turns to the northeast at an intersection with Golden Road. US 264 crosses Far Creek which drains into the nearby Pamlico Sound and exits Engelhard to the north.

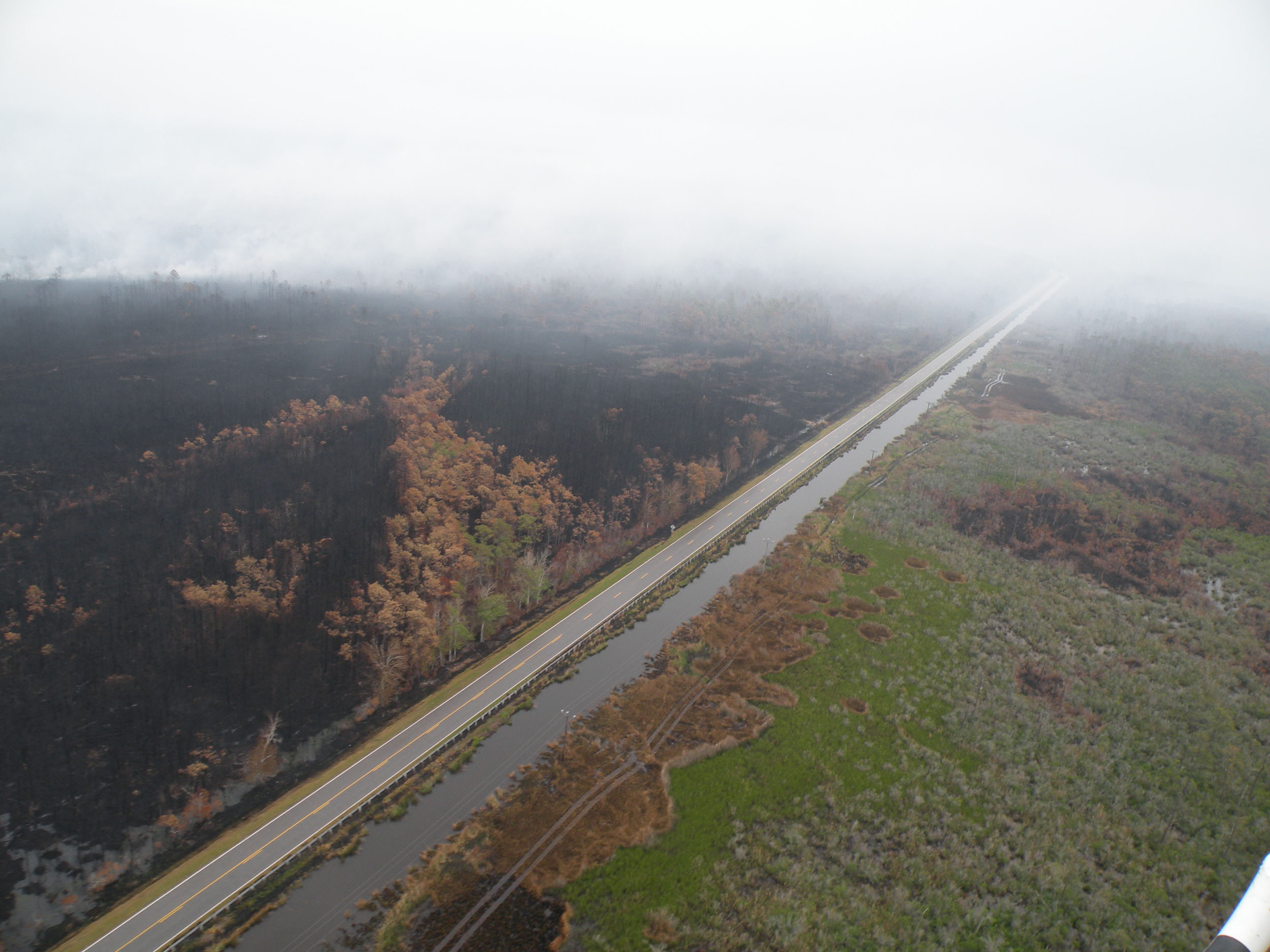
US 264 traveling through the Alligator River National Wildlife Refuge in Dare County

Northeast of Engelhard, US 264 travels through rural Hyde County. It passes adjacent to the Hyde County Airport before making a turn to the north. US 264 travels in a northerly orientation for four miles (six point four kilometres) before turning back to the northeast for approximately two miles (three point two kilometres). The highway then turns to the east and crosses the Long Shoal River where it enters into Dare County. Approximately one mile (one point six kilometres) east of the Long Shoal River, US 264 turns to the southeast. It remains in a southeasterly orientation for 4 miles (6.4 km) before briefly turning to the east and then begins a gradual turn to the north. The remainder of the route largely parallels shoreline of the Pamlico or Croatan Sound. In the vicinity of Stumpy Point, the highway runs adjacent to the shoreline of Stumpy Point Bay. On the north side of the bay, it intersects Bayview Drive which provides access to the community of Stumpy Point. US 264 continues north through the Alligator River National Wildlife Refuge for 5.6 miles (9.0 km) before turning to the northwest. The highway continues northwest for 3.9 miles (6.3 km) before making a final turn to the northeast. US 264 travels for an additional 2.5 miles (4.0 km) before intersecting its eastern terminus at US 64 west of Manns Harbor in Dare County.

=== Scenic byways ===
Pamlico Scenic Byway is an 127-mile (204 km) byway from Washington to Manns Harbor. US 264 overlap several sections of the byway. The byway is noted for its history, scenic views, and the three national wildlife refuges that the route goes through. Other roads and highways that make-up the byway are: NC 32, NC 45, NC 92, and NC 94.

== History ==
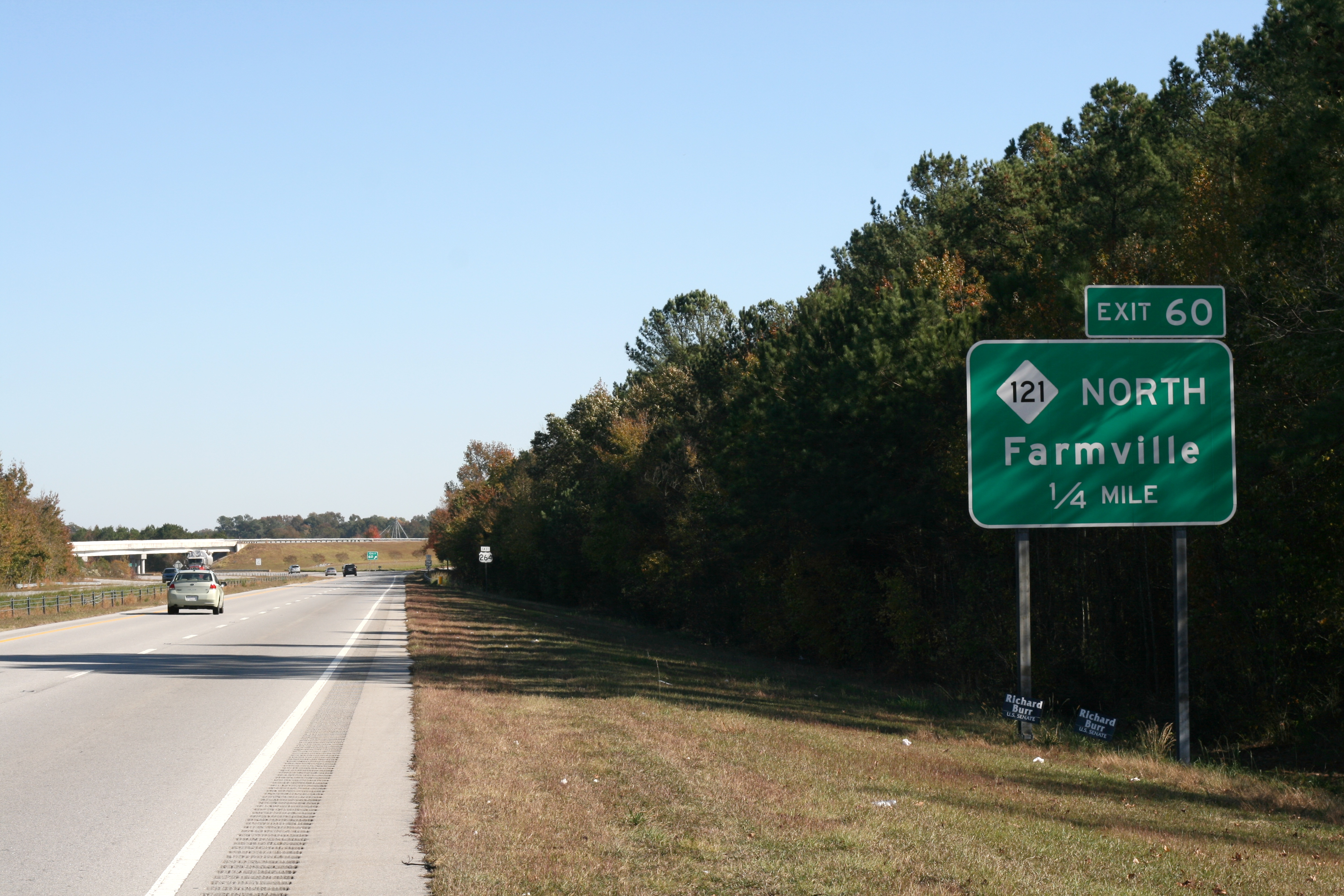
Exit 60 for NC 121 and Farmville

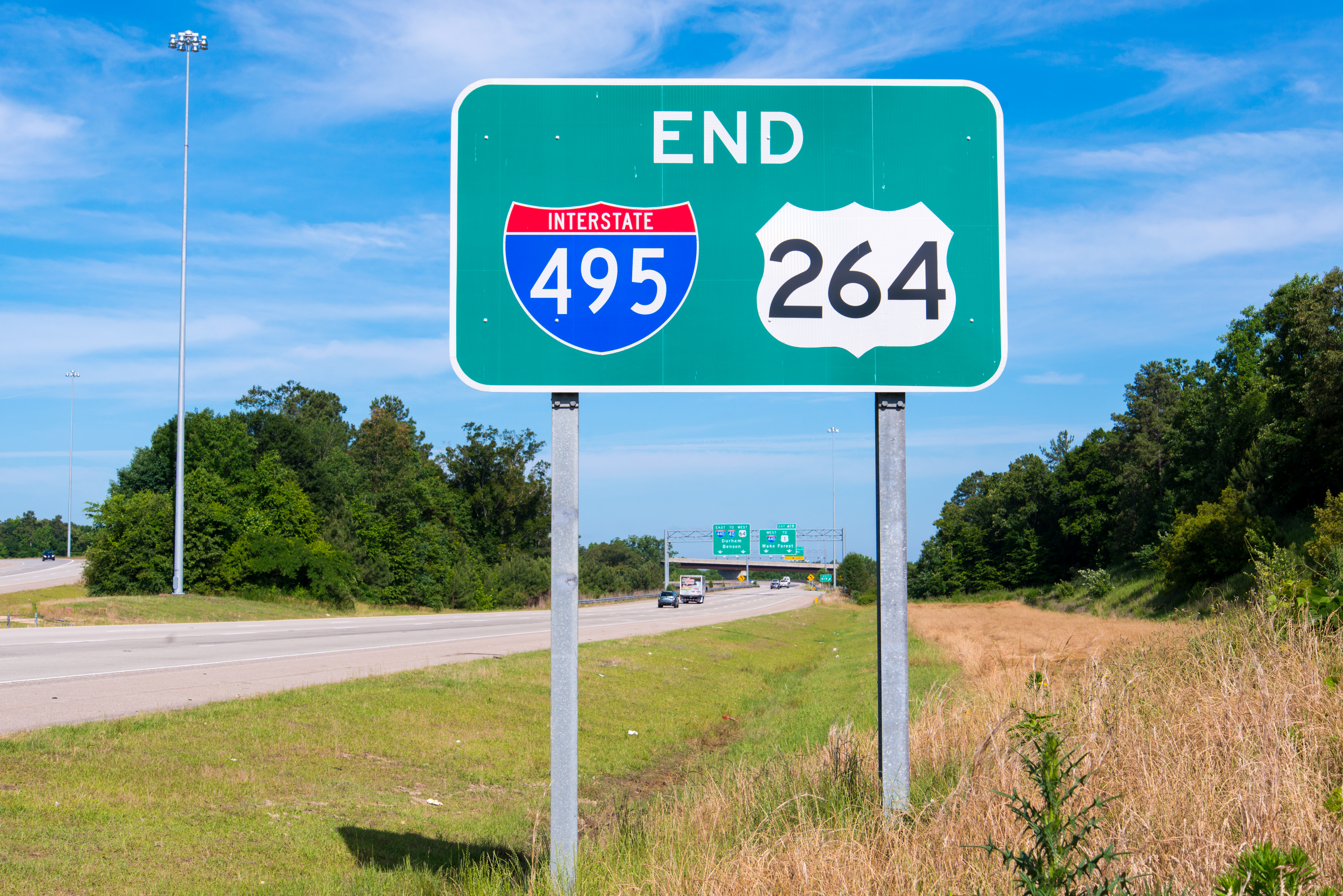
End of former I-495 and US 264, in Raleigh

Established in 1932, US 264 started from US 64/NC 90, in Zebulon, to the community of Engelhard, in Hyde County. The route was overlapped entirely with NC 91 and was paved west of Swan Quarter. In 1934, NC 91 was removed along the route; in 1935, US 264 was paved from Swan Quarter to Engelhard.

Sometime between 1948-'50, US 264 was moved south around Wilson, on Ward Boulevard; the old route became US 264 Alternate, which later became US 264 Business in 1960 till 1980-'84.

Sometime between 1951-'52, US 264 was extended east from Engelhard to Manns Harbor, where it connected back with US 64. It continued east, overlapped with US 64, ending at Whalebone Junction with US 158 and NC 12.

Sometime between 1953-'54, US 264 was bypassed Farmville and Greenville; the old routes became US 264 Alternate, eventually both were decommissioned by 1990. By 1958, US 264 was moved north around Swan Quarter, replaced by NC 45 and NC 94. In 1962-'63, US 264 was bypassed north around Belhaven, old route through town becoming US 264 Business.

Between 1972-'78, US 264 was moved onto a Super-2 routing north of Sims, Bailey, and Middlesex. Much of the old route become US 264 Business, which is today part of US 264 Alternate. In 1979, the Super-2 was upgraded to freeway standards.

Between 1987-'90, US 264 was moved onto new freeway south of Wilson; the old route along Ward Boulevard became part of the current US 264 Alternate route. Also during this time, US 264 was upgraded to freeway standards east of Farmville to Greenville. Between 1991-'93, US 264 was moved north onto new freeway, bypassing Farmville.

Sometime between 1994 and 1999, US 264 was extended west from Zebulon, to the junction with I-440 in Raleigh. This would later change on July 8, 2005, when the Knightdale Bypass was completed.

In August 2002, US 264 was truncated east at Manns Harbor.

In 2004, US 264 was rerouted, between I-95 and NC 121, onto new freeway, south of Wilson. In 2007, part of this route was overlapped with I-795.

In 2006, the 20-mile (32 km) portion of US 264 linking Zebulon to Wilson was renamed "Governor James B. High Highway", in honor of former North Carolina Governor Jim Hunt.

In 2016, construction began on a bypass between US 264 in Greenville, where it connects with the city's Stantonsburg Road, to NC 11 as it passes through Ayden.

On June 22, 2022, I-587 was officially established from I-95, near Wilson, to NC 11 Bypass, in Greenville; as a result of the new designation, US 264 was realigned back to its former routing from north of Saratoga to Greenville.

== Junction list ==
County	Location	mi	km	Exit	Destinations	Notes
Wake	Raleigh	0.0	0.0	3	I-87 south / I-440 / US 64 west (US 64 Bus. east) – Durham, Benson, Wake Forest	Southern end of I-87 concurrency; western end of US 64 concurrency
Wake	Raleigh	0.8	1.3	4	New Hope Road	
Wake	Knightdale	3.0	4.8	6	Hodge Road	
Wake	Knightdale	4.0	6.4	7	I-540 west – Wake Forest, RDU Airport	
Wake		6.3	10.1	9	Smithfield Road	
Wake	Wendell	8.0	12.9	11	Wendell Falls Parkway	
Wake	Wendell	9.8	15.8	13	US 64 Bus. (Wendell Boulevard) – Knightdale	
Wake	Wendell	10.2	16.4	14	I-87 ends / Rolesville Road – Rolesville	Northern end of I-87 concurrency; westbound exit and eastbound entrance
Wake	Wendell	13.0	20.9	432	Lizard Lick Road – Wendell	
Wake	Zebulon	16.2	26.1	435	US 64 Bus. west / NC 96 – Zebulon, Oxford	
Wake	Zebulon	17.2	27.7	1	US 64 east – Nashville, Rocky Mount	Eastern end of US 64 concurrency, future western terminus of I-587
Wake	Zebulon	18.0	29.0	2	NC 97 – Zebulon, Oxford	
Wake	Zebulon	19.5	31.4	3	US 264 Alt. east / NC 39 – Selma, Louisburg	
Johnston	No major junctions					
Nash	Middlesex	24.1	38.8	7	NC 231 – Middlesex	
Nash	Bailey	28.3	45.5	11	NC 581 – Bailey, Spring Hope	
Wilson	Sims	31.8	51.2	14	Green Pond Road – Sims	
Wilson		33.7	54.2	16	US 264 Alt. – Sims, Wilson	Signed as exits 36A (west) and 36B (east)
Wilson		35.8	57.6	18	I-95 / I-587 begins / I-795 begins – Benson, Rocky Mount	Western end of I-587 and northern end of I-795 concurrency; signed as exits 18B (south) and 18A (north)
Wilson		37.6	60.5	20	NC 42 – Wilson, Clayton	
Wilson		39.3	63.2	22	Downing Street – Wilson	
Wilson		40.2	64.7	23	I-795 south – Goldsboro, Kenly	Southern end of I-795 concurrency; eastbound exit and westbound entrance
Wilson	Wilson	41.1	66.1	24	US 301 to US 117 – Wilson	Signed as exits 24B (south) and 24A (north)
Wilson	Wilson	47.3	76.1	26	Black Creek Road	
Wilson		46.8	75.3	28	Old Stantonburg Road	
Wilson		48.6	78.2	29	NC 58 – Wilson, Kinston	
Wilson		50.0	80.5	32	I-587 east / US 264 Alt. west – Wilson, Saratoga	Eastern end of I-587 concurrency
Wilson	Saratoga				NC 111 / NC 222 (Church Street) – Stantonsburg, Fountain	
Greene	Walstonburg				NC 91 south (Wilson Street) – Walstonburg, Snow Hill	Southern end of NC 91 concurrency
Greene					NC 91 north (Bell Road)	Northern end of NC 91 concurrency
Greene					NC 121 south – Wilson	Southern end of NC 121 concurrency
Greene					NC 121 north (Wilson Street) – Farmville	Northern end of NC 121 concurrency
Pitt	Farmville				US 258 (Main Street) – Snow Hill	
Pitt					US 13 south – Snow Hill	Southern end of US 13 concurrency
Pitt				119	US 264 Alt. east / NC 11 Byp. south – Greenville, Kinston	Southern end of NC 11 Bypass concurrency
Pitt	Greenville	73.0	117.5	73	I-587 west / Stantonsburg Road – Greenville Downtown, Wilson	Signed as exits 73A (west) and 73B (downtown); eastern terminus of I-587
Pitt	Greenville	74.7	120.2	75	NC 43 – Greenville, Rocky Mount	
Pitt	Greenville	77.2	124.2	77	NC 33 – Tarboro, Greenville	
Pitt	Greenville	80.0	128.7	80	US 13 / NC 11 / NC 903 / NC 11 Byp. end – Greenville, Bethel	Northern end of NC 11 Byp. concurrency, future eastern terminus of I-587
Pitt	Greenville	83.3	134.1		US 264 Alt. west / NC 33 – Greenville	
Pitt		90.3	145.3		NC 30 west – Bethel	Eastern terminus of NC 30
Beaufort	Washington	99.4	160.0		US 17 – New Bern, Williamston	
Beaufort	Washington	100.7	162.1		US 17 Bus. – New Bern, Williamston	Western end of NC 92 concurrency
Beaufort		107.1	172.4		NC 32 – Plymouth	
Beaufort		110.0	177.0		NC 92 east – Bath	Eastern end of NC 92 concurrency
Beaufort	Pantego	126.2	203.1		NC 99 north – Plymouth	Northern end of NC 99 concurrency
Beaufort	Belhaven	129.9	209.1		US 264 Bus. east / NC 99 south – Bath	Southern end of NC 99 concurrency
Beaufort		132.3	212.9		US 264 Bus. west – Belhaven	
Hyde		139.2	224.0		NC 45 north – Plymouth	Northern end of NC 45 concurrency
Hyde		154.4	248.5		NC 45 south – Swan Quarter	Southern end of NC 45 concurrency
Hyde		156.5	251.9		NC 94 south – Swan Quarter	Southern end of NC 94 concurrency
Hyde		163.5	263.1		NC 94 north – Columbia	Northern end of NC 94 concurrency
Dare	Manns Harbor	215.7	347.1		US 64 – Columbia, Nags Head	
1.000 mi = 1.609 km; 1.000 km = 0.621 mi: Concurrency terminus

== Special routes ==
=== Middlesex–Greenville alternate route ===
U.S. Highway 264 Alternate
- Location: Zebulon–Wilson and Greenville, North Carolina
- Length: 64.3 mi (103.5 km)
- Existed: 1984–present

Established around 1984, US 264 Alternate was a renumbering of the Middlesex business loop, which followed the original alignment of US 264 from Middlesex to Wilson. In 2004, it was extended east to Greenville, absorbing US 264 alternate between Farmville and Greenville. In June 2022, after approval from AASHTO in 2021 Annual Meeting, mainline US 264 was rerouted back along its former routing between north of Saratoga to Greenville with US 264 Alternate decommissioned along that section. The still existing portions of the alternate route are now two segments, with the Zebulon–Wilson western segment and the Greenville eastern segment.

County	Location	mi	km	Destinations	Notes
Wake	Zebulon	0.0	0.0	US 264 / NC 39 – Raleigh, Wilson, Emit, Bunn	Brief overlap with NC 39
Johnston	No major junctions				
Nash	Middlesex	4.5	7.2	NC 231 (Nash Street) – Emit	
Nash	Bailey	9.4	15.1	NC 581 – Kenly, Spring Hope	
Wilson		15.0	24.1	US 264 – Raleigh, Greenville	
Wilson	Wilson	16.3	26.2	I-95 – Smithfield, Rocky Mount	
Wilson	Wilson	21.0	33.8	NC 42 east (Ward Boulevard)	East end of NC 42 overlap
Wilson	Wilson	21.8	35.1	NC 42 west (Tarboro Street)	West end of NC 42 overlap
Wilson	Wilson	23.3	37.5	US 301 south – Kenly, Smithfield	South end of US 301 overlap
Wilson	Wilson	25.0	40.2	US 301 north / NC 58 (Ward Boulevard) – Elm City, Rocky Mount	North end of US 301 and NC 58 overlap
Wilson	Wilson	26.5	42.6	NC 58 south (Martin Luther King Jr Parkway) – Stantonsburg	South end of NC 58 overlap
Wilson		31.5	50.7	I-587 / US 264 – Raleigh, Greenville, Farmville	
Gap in route
Pitt		54.9	88.4	US 264 / NC 11 Byp. – Greenville, Kinston	Exit 119 (NC 11 Bypass)
Pitt	Greenville	56.2	90.4	US 13 north (Dickinson Avenue) – Greenville	North end of US 13 overlap
Pitt	Greenville	58.0	93.3	NC 11 / NC 43 north / NC 903 (Memorial Drive) – Kinston	North end of NC 43 overlap
Pitt	Greenville	58.0	93.3	NC 43 south (Charles Boulevard) – Vanceboro	South end of NC 43 overlap
Pitt	Greenville	62.5	100.6	NC 33 east (10th Street) – Simpson, Grimesland, Chocowinity	East end of NC 33 overlap
Pitt	Greenville	64.3	103.5	US 264 (Greenville Boulevard) / NC 33 west (Pactolus Highway) – Farmville, Tarboro, Washington	West end of NC 33 overlap
1.000 mi = 1.609 km; 1.000 km = 0.621 mi: Concurrency terminus

=== Middlesex business loop ===
U.S. Highway 264 Business
- Location: Middlesex, North Carolina
- Length: 15.0 mi (24.1 km)
- Existed: 1978–1984

Established by 1978, it was a renumbering of mainline US 264, which was moved onto new routing north of Bailey, Middlesex, and Sims. Originally, US 264 business ran from NC 581 to near Interstate 95; it was extended west to NC 39 in 1979. In 1984, the entire route was redesignated to US 264 Alternate.

=== Wilson business loop ===
U.S. Highway 264 Business
- Location: Wilson, North Carolina
- Length: 2.0 mi (3.2 km)
- Existed: 1960–1977

U.S. Route 264 Business (US 264 Business) was a 2.0 miles (3.2 km) business route of US 264 through the city of Wilson.

The routing of US 264 Business was once part of US 264 prior to 1950. In 1950, US 264 was rerouted and the former alignment through downtown Wilson along Raleigh Road and Nash Street became US 264A. In 1960, US 264A was renamed to US 264 Business. The highway remained the same until 1972, when it was removed from Bynum Street, Vance Street, Pender Street, and parts of Raleigh Road and Nash Street. Instead, US 264 Business was routed to follow Hines Street between Raleigh Road Parkway and East Nash Street. In 1977, US 264 Business was decommissioned.

U.S. Highway 264A
- Location: Wilson, North Carolina
- Length: 2.0 mi (3.2 km)
- Existed: 1950–1960

=== Farmville alternate route ===
U.S. Highway 264A Business
- Location: Farmville, North Carolina
- Length: 8.3 mi (13.4 km)
- Existed: 1954–1990

Established around 1954 as a renumbering of mainline US 264, it traversed through downtown Farmville, via Wilson Street and Moye-Turnage Road. It was decommissioned by 1990 when US 264 bypassed north of Farmville and its former alignment south of Farmville became its alternate route. NC 121 replaced the eastern half of the former route from US 264 Alt to Main Street.

=== Wilson–Greenville alternate route ===
U.S. Highway 264 Alternate
- Location: Wilson–Greenville, NC
- Length: 37.8 mi (60.8 km)
- Existed: 1988–2003

Established around 1990 as a renumbering of mainline US 264; which traversed from Farmville to Greenville. In 2002, it was extended west of Farmville to Wilson, replacing part of NC 121 and NC 91. In 2004, it was absorbed by the Middlesex-Greenville alternate route.

=== Greenville alternate route ===
U.S. Highway 264A
- Location: Greenville, North Carolina
- Length: 6.2 mi (10.0 km)
- Existed: 1954–1960

Established by 1954 as a renumbering of mainline US 264, it traversed through downtown Greenville via Dickinson Avenue and East 10th Street. In 1960, it was renumbered as US 264 Business.

The route of the Greenville and Raleigh Plank Road, which was established in 1853, became part of the route of US 264 between Greenville and Wilson, North Carolina. Although no longer maintained after the company went bankrupt in 1861, the route was still used as an unpaved track and Right of way by horse and motor traffic. State senator James Leonidas Fleming, who established East Carolina University in Greenville, was killed in an early automobile accident along the plank road in 1909.

=== Greenville business loop ===
U.S. Highway 264 Business
- Location: Greenville, North Carolina
- Length: 6.2 mi (10.0 km)
- Existed: 1960–1990

Established in 1960 as a renumbering of US 264 Alternate, it remained unchanged till 1990, when it was decommissioned.

=== Belhaven alternate route ===
U.S. Highway 264A
- Location: Belhaven, North Carolina
- Length: 2.9 mi (4.7 km)
- Existed: 1957–1960

U.S. Route 264 Alternate (US 264A) was established around 1954-1957 as a renumbering of mainline US 264, it traversed through downtown Belhaven, via Main Street and Pamlico Street. In 1960, it was renumbered as US 264 Business.

=== Belhaven business loop ===
U.S. Highway 264 Business
- Location: Belhaven, North Carolina
- Length: 2.9 mi (4.7 km)
- Existed: 1960–present

U.S. Route 264 Business (US 264 Bus) was established in 1960, the 2.9-mile (4.7 km) route follows the original US 264 alignment through downtown Belhaven, via Main Street and Pamlico Street.

The entire route is in Beaufort County.

Location	mi	km	Destinations	Notes
Belhaven	0.0	0.0	US 264 / NC 99 – Pantego, Washington, Bath, Swanquarter	
	2.9	4.7	US 264 – Belhaven, Swanquarter	
1.000 mi = 1.609 km; 1.000 km = 0.621 mi

=== Manns Harbor–Manteo Bypass ===
U.S. Highway 264 Bypass
- Location: Manns Harbor–Manteo, NC
- Length: 5.9 mi (9.5 km)
- Existed: 1999–2003

U.S. Route 264 Bypass (US 264 By-pass) was established in 1999 as a new primary routing bypassing Manns Harbor and Manteo, while also providing direct access between Nags Head and the mainland. Its main feature is the Virginia Dare Memorial Bridge, which is a divided four-lane bridge crossing over the Croatan Sound. Sharing a complete concurrency with US 64 Bypass throughout its existence, it was removed in 2003 when US 264's eastern terminus was relocated further west.

== See also ==
- North Carolina Bicycle Route 2 – Concurrent with US 264 between Pactolus and Latham, downtown Washington, Jessama, between Bellhaven and Swanquarter, and between Lake Comfort and its eastern terminus
