= Interstate 587 =

Interstate 587 (I-587) may refer to:

- Interstate 587 (New York)
- Interstate 587 (North Carolina)
