= Speight-Bynum House =

Historic house in North Carolina, United States

- U.S. National Register of Historic Places
- Location within North Carolina Location within the United States
- Location: NC 1231 W side, 0.4 miles N of jct. with NC 1232, near Walstonsburg, North Carolina 2421 Sand Pit Road, Stantonsburg, NC 27883
- Coordinates: 35°35′05″N 77°45′53″W
- Area: 12 acres (4.9 ha)
- Built: c. 1850
- Architectural style: Greek Revival
- NRHP reference No.: 92000148
- Added to NRHP: March 12, 1992

Speight-Bynum House is a historic plantation house located near Walstonsburg, Greene County, North Carolina. It was built about 1850, and is a two-story, double pile, three bay, Greek Revival style heavy timber frame dwelling. It has a one-story rear addition built in 1938, a low hip roof, and one-story full-width front porch. Also on the property is a contributing smokehouse (c. 1850).

It was listed on the National Register of Historic Places in 1992.
