= North Carolina Highway 11 Bypass =

State highway in Pitt County, North Carolina, US

North Carolina Highway 11 Bypass
- Greenville Southwest Bypass (NC 11 in Ayden to I-587 near Greenville)
- NC 11 Byp. highlighted in red

Route information
- Maintained by NCDOT
- Length: 17.9 mi (28.8 km)
- Existed: 2019–present

Major junctions
- South end: NC 11 near Ayden
- US 13 / US 264 / US 264 Alt. near Greenville; I-587 near Greenville
- North end: US 13 / US 264 / NC 11 / NC 903 near Greenville

Location
- Country: United States
- State: North Carolina
- Counties: Pitt

Highway system
- North Carolina Highway System; Interstate; US; State; Scenic

North Carolina Highway 11 Bypass (NC 11 Byp.), is a 17.9-mile (28.8 km), bypass route of NC 11 in Pitt County, North Carolina. The bypass is a four-lane freeway that runs between a junction with NC 11 south of Ayden to an interchange with U.S. Route 264 (US 264), US 13, NC 11, and NC 903 north of Greenville, wrapping around the west side of Ayden and Winterville and the northwest side of Greenville. The southern 12.6 miles (20.3 km) of the route is known as the Greenville Southwest Bypass to locals, which was built due to plans relating traffic alleviation the NC 11 and Stantonsburg Road corridors. The remaining 6.8-mile (10.9 km) segment of the route is concurrent with US 264.

The Greenville Southwest Bypass was proposed due to the recent increased population growth of Greenville, which has led to congestion along the NC 11 corridor. Additionally, the bypass was also planned to help aid growth and development within the area. As such, the Southwest Bypass Land Use Plan was adopted by the Pitt County Board of Commissioners on October 15, 2018, in order to guide the design and scale of future development along the corridor.

== Route description ==
The route begins, under the billed "Greenville Southwest Bypass" inside southern Ayden. It starts south, with NC 11 exiting off heading into the core areas of Ayden and Winterville. The four-lane rural freeway wraps around the west area of Ayden using exit numbers which are based on the mile markers of NC 11. The route continues north to an interchange with NC 102 continuing northward through rural areas of Pitt County, including the Renston Rural Historic District, going west of central Winterville to the west and coming to two closely spaced diamond interchanges with Forlines Road and US 13, US 264, and US 264 Alternate (Dickinson Avenue), with US 264 joining its concurrency with NC 11 Bypass. West of Downtown Greenville, the Greenville Southwest Bypass ends with the cloverleaf interchange with I-587 and Stantonsburg Road, with the NC 11 Bypass freeway continuing north concurrent with US 264. Wrapping around the central Greenville to the northwest, the route now uses mile mileage numbers of US 264. The route intersects NC 43 and NC 33 before terminating when coming to the folded diamond interchange with US 13/NC 11/NC 903, from which US 264 continues to the east along the four-lane partial controlled access highway.

== History ==
In December 2007, the North Carolina Department of Transportation (NCDOT) completed a final environmental impact statement and also identified the preferred alternatives for the project. Due to the bypass's proposed routing passing through the Renston Rural Historic District, the design was modified in 2007 in order to lessen the freeway's impact on the district. The design changes included removing a proposed interchange at NC 903 and shifting the alignment of the bypass eastward. In August 2008, NCDOT released a record of decision for the project, detailing the chosen alternative. The acquisition of the right-of-way was completed in January 2015. Construction on the project began in September 2016, and the project was expected to be completed in June 2020. In May 2015, NCDOT awarded a $159 million contract to Barnhill Contracting, Sanford Contractors and HDR Design Group to design and construct the project, which was built via the design-build method. Initially, the project, which meets Interstate Highway standards, was expected to cost a total of $231.8 million, including $159 million for construction, and be completed by June 2020. However, the project was ahead of schedule and was expected to cost less than the original estimates and be completed by November 2019. The Greenville Southwest Bypass opened to traffic on November 22, 2019.

== Exit list ==
Exit numbers are based on the mileage of NC 11 from its mainline route to Interstate 587. The entire route is in Pitt County.

Location	mi	km	Exit	Destinations	Notes
Ayden	0.0	0.0	—	NC 11 south – Kinston	Continuation as NC 11 south; northbound exit and southbound entrance; NC 11 north is signed as exit 112 on northbound NC 11 Bypass
Ayden			113	NC 102 – Ayden	Partial Cloverleaf Interchange; Signed as Exit 113A (east) and Exit 113B (west) from southbound NC 11 Bypass
Greenville			118	Forlines Road – Winterville, Pitt Community College	Diamond Interchange
Greenville			119	US 13 / US 264 west / US 264 Alt. east (Dickinson Avenue) – Snow Hill	West end of US 264 overlap; diamond interchange
Greenville	12.6	20.3	123 / 73	123A / 73B: Stantonsburg Road – Downtown Greenville 123B / 73A: I-587 west (John P. East Memorial Highway) – Wilson	Cloverleaf interchange; signed as Exits 123A/B northbound and 73A/B southbound
Greenville			75	NC 43 – Greenville, Rocky Mount	Diamond interchange
Greenville			77	NC 33 – Tarboro, Greenville	Diamond interchange
Greenville			80	US 13 / US 264 east / NC 11 / NC 903 – Washington, Greenville, Bethel	Folded diamond interchange; east end of US 264 overlap; road continues east as US 264
1.000 mi = 1.609 km; 1.000 km = 0.621 mi: Concurrency terminus; Incomplete access
