= Interstate 87 (North Carolina) =

Interstate Highway in Wake County, North Carolina, United States

Interstate 87
- I-87 highlighted in red; Future I-87 highlighted in blue

Route information
- Maintained by NCDOT
- Length: 12.90 mi (20.76 km)
- Existed: 2017–present
- NHS: Entire route

Major junctions
- South end: I-40 / I-440 / US 64 in Raleigh
- I-440 in Raleigh; I-540 in Knightdale
- North end: US 64 / US 264 in Wendell

Location
- Country: United States
- State: North Carolina
- Counties: Wake

Highway system
- Interstate Highway System; Main; Auxiliary; Suffixed; Business; Future; North Carolina Highway System; Interstate; US; State; Scenic
← NC 86	→ NC 87

Interstate 87 (I-87) is a partially completed Interstate Highway in the US state of North Carolina, the 2nd shortest designated primary Interstate Highway at 12.90 miles (20.76 km) long. The completed portion is in eastern Wake County, between Raleigh and Wendell; the majority of the completed route (approximately 10 miles (16 km)) is known as the Knightdale Bypass, while the remaining three miles (4.8 km) follows the Raleigh Beltline (I-440). It is planned to continue northeast through Rocky Mount, Williamston, and Elizabeth City, ending in Norfolk, Virginia. It is signed as north–south, in keeping with the sign convention for most odd-numbered Interstates, but the route goes primarily east–west, with the eastern direction aligning to the north designation. The entire route is concurrent with U.S Highway 64 (US 64), with portions also concurrent with I-440 and US 264. The highway is not contiguous with I-87 in New York.

== Route description ==
I-87 is a six-lane Interstate Highway that connects I-40, in Raleigh, to Rolesville Road, in Wendell; it is entirely concurrent with US 64. The speed limit for majority of the route is 70 mph (110 km/h).

The southern terminus is at the interchange of I-40 and I-440 (Raleigh Beltline) in Southeast Raleigh, at I-40 exit 301/I-440 exit 16. I-87 north follows I-440 west for approximately three miles (4.8 km) before exiting the Beltline at exit 14 to follow the US 64/US 264 (former I-495) freeway, known locally as the Knightdale Bypass. Following the Bypass south of Knightdale, I-87 has interchanges with two local roads (New Hope Road and Hodge Road) before meeting the eastern terminus of I-540. Two more local roads follow (Smithfield Road and Wendell Falls Parkway) before the I-87 designation ends at a complex interchange with US 64 Business (US 64 Bus.)/Knightdale Boulevard/Wendell Boulevard and Rolesville Road.

A portion of this freeway (from I-440 to I-540) was formerly designated I-495 from 2013 to 2017. I-495 signs were removed, and mileage markers and exit numbers were changed to reflect the redesignation in May 2019.

Beyond Rolesville Road, the US 64 freeway from Wendell to Williamston is designated as Future I-87. It does not meet Interstate Highway standards and will need wider travel lanes, wider shoulders and Jersey barriers added in the grass median. The remainder to the Virginia border is not built as a limited access freeway and will require expansion parallel to existing US Highways, including US 13, US 17, and US 158.

== History ==
=== Interstate 495 ===
Interstate 495
- Location: Raleigh–Knightdale
- Length: 4.09 mi (6.58 km)
- Existed: 2013–2017

A portion of I-87, originally designated I-495, was first designated as an Interstate Highway on February 20, 2013, when the North Carolina Department of Transportation (NCDOT) submitted a request to the American Association of State Highway and Transportation Officials (AASHTO) in order to establish I-495 as a new auxiliary route of I-95. The proposed 44.99-mile (72.40 km) route would begin at I-440/US 64/US 64 Bus. in Raleigh and would end at I-95, in Rocky Mount, completely concurrent with US 64.

On March 15, 2013, AASHTO received a modified request from NCDOT requesting the establishment of I-495 from I-440 to I-540 (4.09 mi or 6.58 km) and Future I-495 from I-540 to I-95 (40.90 mi or 65.82 km). It was approved, though needed an additional approval from the Federal Highway Administration (FHWA). On December 12, 2013, the proposed section was approved by the FHWA and was added to the Interstate Highway System.

The freeway section, the part that was originally to be signed I-495 and continuing east to US 64 Bus., was completed in 2006. From I-440 to Rolesville Road, the freeway was built to Interstate standards, which is why the first official section of I-495 was able to connect between I-440 and I-540. East of Rolesville Road, the freeway was built in sections, since 1975. This older section of freeway will eventually be expanded to Interstate standards, which include road rehabilitation and wider lanes and shoulders.

=== Renumbering ===
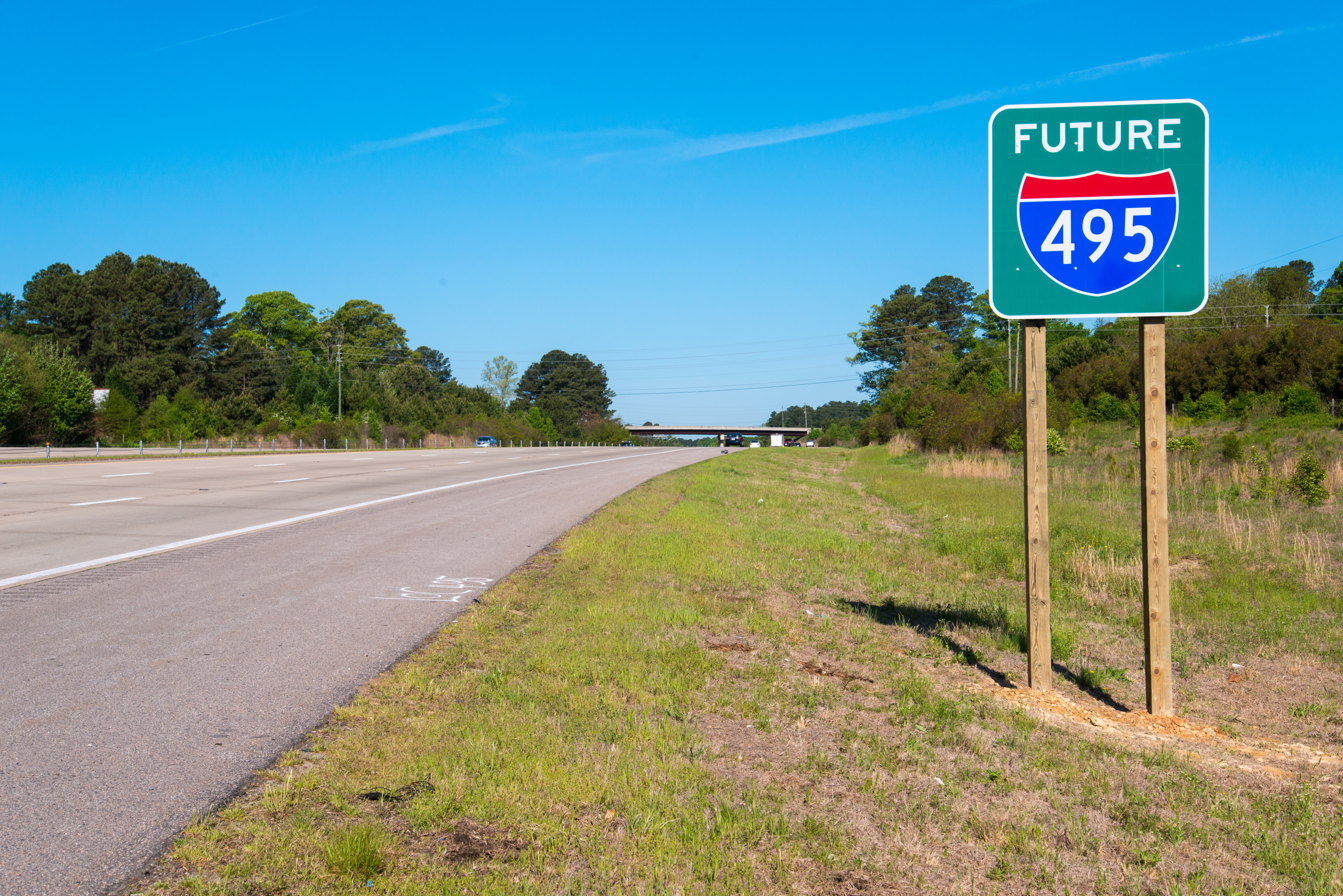
"Future I-495" sign along US 64/US 264 near Knightdale. Signs like this were later replaced by "Future I-87" signs.

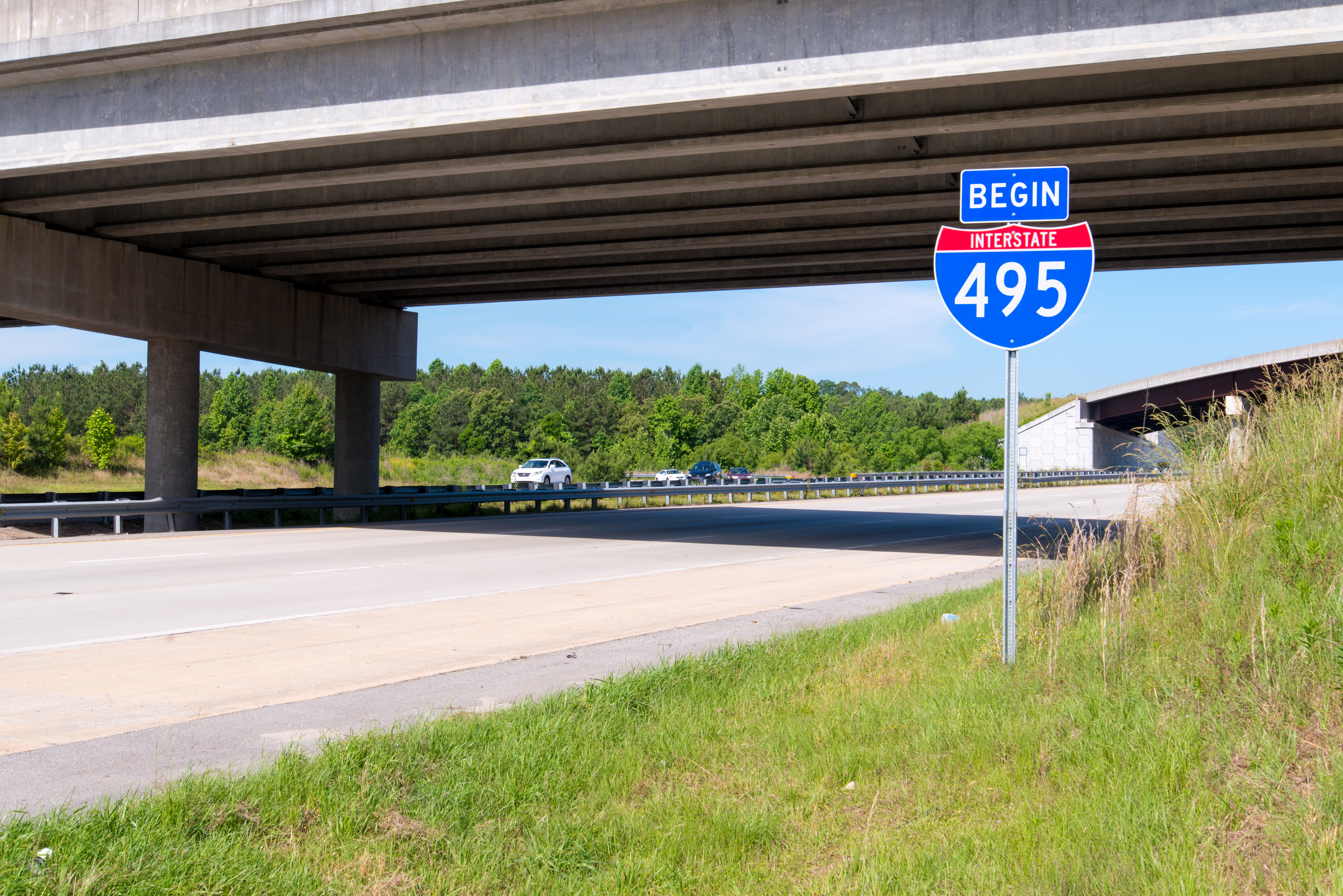
Northern terminus of I-495, in Knightdale

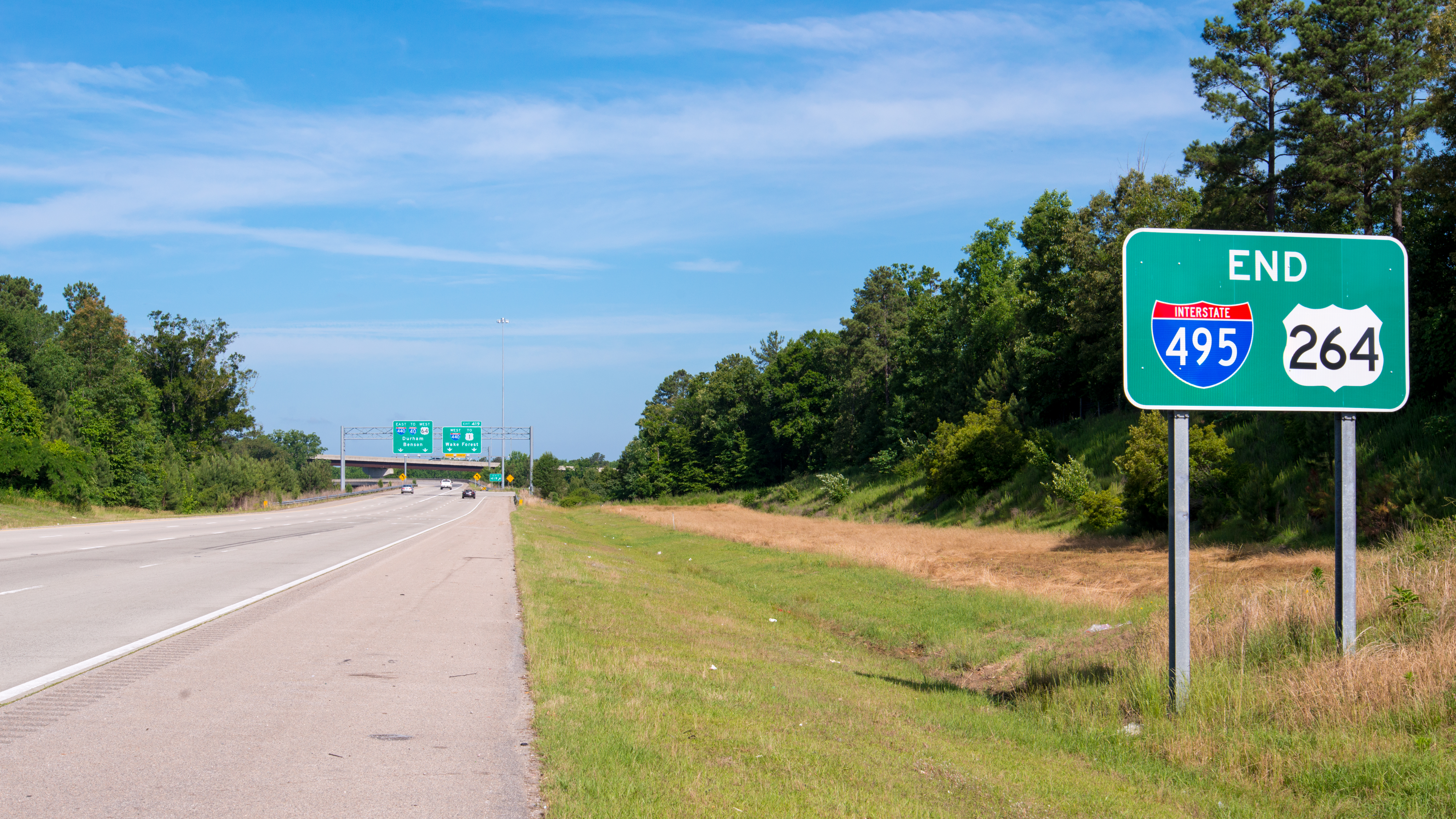
Southern terminus of I-495/US 264 in Raleigh

Long-term plans by the Raleigh–Durham area's Regional Transportation Alliance (RTA) called for extension of the Interstate east of I-95 toward Elizabeth City, then northeastward to the I-64/I-464 interchange in Hampton Roads. NCDOT proposed the Interstate 44 designation for the Raleigh–Norfolk High Priority Corridor consisting of portions of the I-495 and US 64 in North Carolina and US 17 in North Carolina and Virginia. The route would connect two of the largest US metropolitan areas lacking an Interstate connection: the Research Triangle area around Raleigh and the Hampton Roads area around Norfolk.

NCDOT requested the addition of the corridor to the Interstate Highway System as I-44 in November 2012. Representative G. K. Butterfield introduced legislation in June 2014 to add the corridor to the Interstate Highway System through Congressional authority. An NCDOT policy paper said they were "seeking language in the reauthorization of surface transportation programs legislation to enhance the description of the Raleigh–Norfolk Corridor to include the route via Rocky Mount–Elizabeth City for clarity, and to designate the entire route from Raleigh to Norfolk as a future part of the Interstate system as I-44 or I-50". Had the I-44 designation been approved, it would have been discontinuous with the current I-44, which runs between Wichita Falls, Texas, and St. Louis, Missouri.

The proposed corridor was officially designated as a future Interstate with the passage of the Fixing America's Surface Transportation Act (FAST Act) on December 14, 2015. Soon, several other route numbers were discussed and the RTA set their preference on two more-likely candidates: I-56 if an east–west designation were chosen or I-89 if a north–south designation were chosen. I-56 is not in use, while I-89 exists in Vermont and New Hampshire, far north of this corridor. For the upcoming AASHTO Special Committee on US Route Numbering, NCDOT proposed I-89 for this route. On May 25, 2016, AASHTO instead approved I-87 as the number for the highway. The new I-87 would be noncontiguous with the route with the same number in New York. The I-87 designation pays tribute to several important dates in the history of both North Carolina and Virginia: the Roanoke Colony was founded in 1587, James Madison's Virginia Plan helped to develop the US Constitution in 1787, and North Carolina State University was created in 1887.

On May 23, 2017, AASHTO approved the request by NCDOT to decommission existing I-495 and Future I-495; they were replaced by I-87 and Future I-87. I-87 signage were installed on September 5, 2017; in May 2019 milemarkers and exit numbers were changed along the already completed segment from the I-440 junction to Rolesville Road. Exit numbers and mileage along the portion coincident with I-440 will retain I-440 mileage and exit numbers. I-87 will continue east along US 64 to I-95 after the road is expanded to Interstate standards.

== Future ==
I-87 will extend from its current terminus at Rolesville Road to an undetermined location in Norfolk, Virginia. Existing plans have the Interstate running east along US 64 to Williamston. This section of US 64 is built as a freeway but will need to be improved to Interstate Highway standards. In Williamston, the Interstate is planned to leave US 64 and begin following an alignment along present-day US 17.

A feasibility study for the section between Williamston and the Virginia state line was completed in 2018. NCDOT maps show the Interstate roughly following the US 17 corridor between Williamston and South Mills. There are several areas where the Interstate may deviate from the current routing of US 17 and be placed on a new freeway. Some of these expansions are part of the NCDOT 10-year plan released in 2017, with expansion of highways around Elizabeth City given a start date of 2023.

To the north of South Mills, NCDOT has laid out two plans on how the Interstate would proceed to Virginia. One plan shows I-87 running north along US 17 to the Virginia state line. In contrast, a second plan shows an interchange with I-87 and US 17 just north of modern-day McPherson Road and the Dismal Swamp Welcome Center. I-87 would then proceed to the east along new routing to North Carolina Highway 168 (NC 168)/State Route 168 (SR 168). The interchange with Route 168 would take place just north of the North Carolina–Virginia state line. This alternate alignment was in response to VDOT expressing concern that I-87 would be seen as a non-toll alternative to SR 168 if the former were constructed along the US 17 corridor. Currently, US 17 is a four-lane expressway between the North Carolina state line and Norfolk, Virginia. SR 168 is also a four-lane expressway for approximately 1.8 miles (2.9 km) between the state line and Battlefield Boulevard (SR 168 Bus.), but then transitions to a four-lane tolled limited access freeway known as the Chesapeake Expressway north of that intersection. If NCDOT were to choose this alternative alignment as the preferred route, I-87 would presumably follow SR 168 to Norfolk. NCDOT estimates that the section between Williamston and the Virginia state line could cost between $849.7 million and $945.2 million.

As of February 5, 2024, Virginia does not have a timetable to complete their section of I-87 and is not part of their infrastructure budget.

== Exit list ==
Exit numbers were signed in May 2019. The entire route is in Wake County.

Location	mi	km	Old exit	New exit	Destinations	Notes
Raleigh	0.0	0.0		—	I-40 west / US 64 west – Durham	Continuation as I-40 / US 64
Raleigh	0.0	0.0		16	I-40 east – Wilmington, Benson I-440 east	Western end of I-440 concurrency; mile markers and exit number based on I-440 mileage
Raleigh	1.9	3.1		15	Poole Road	Mile markers and exit number based on I-440 mileage
Raleigh	2.9	4.7	419	3	I-440 west (US 64 Bus. east) – Wake Forest US 264 east	Eastern end of I-440 concurrency; western end of US 264 concurrency; west/north direction signed as exit 14
Raleigh	3.5	5.6	420	4	New Hope Road	
Knightdale	5.7	9.2	422	6	Hodge Road	
Knightdale	6.7	10.8	423	7	I-540 west – Wake Forest, RDU Airport	Will be extended as Toll NC 540
	9.0	14.5	425	9	Smithfield Road	
Wendell	10.7	17.2	427	11	Wendell Falls Parkway	
Wendell	12.5	20.1	429	13	US 64 Bus. (Wendell Boulevard/Knightdale Boulevard) – Knightdale	For southbound entrance onto US 64 Bus. east and northbound entrance from US 64 Bus. west, use Rolesville Road
Wendell	12.9	20.8	430	14	Rolesville Road – Rolesville	Southbound exit and northbound entrance
Wendell	12.9	20.8		—	US 64 east / US 264 east – Rocky Mount, Wilson	Continuation as US 64 / US 264
1.000 mi = 1.609 km; 1.000 km = 0.621 mi: Concurrency terminus; Incomplete access

== Auxiliary routes ==
I-87 in North Carolina has one spur route, I-587 to Greenville. However, the westernmost segment of I-587 that would connect with I-87 near Wendell is still marked as US 264 (and Future I-587) until it is upgraded to current Interstate Highway standards.
