= Titus W. Carr House =

Historic house in North Carolina, United States

- U.S. National Register of Historic Places
- U.S. Historic district
- Location within North Carolina Location within the United States
- Location: SR 1244, near Walstonsburg, North Carolina
- Coordinates: 35°32′14″N 77°40′46″W
- Area: 13.6 acres (5.5 ha)
- Built: c. 1870
- Architectural style: Greek Revival, Italianate
- NRHP reference No.: 87002013
- Added to NRHP: November 25, 1987

Titus W. Carr House is a historic home and national historic district near Walstonsburg, North Carolina. The house was built about 1870, and is a two-story, double-pile, three-bay, transitional Greek Revival / Italianate style dwelling. It has a low hip roof and one-story full-width front porch. Also on the property is a contributing smokehouse / storage house (c. 1870), smokehouse (c. 1900), former kitchen (c. 1870), and woodshed.

It was listed on the National Register of Historic Places in 1987.
