= Theophilus Eagles =

Biographical details
- Born: November 10, 1885; Saratoga, North Carolina, U.S.
- Died: June 7, 1936 (aged 50)
- Education: North Carolina (AB, 1908)

Coaching career (HC unless noted)
- 1908: Catawba

Head coaching record
- Overall: 0–4

Theophilus R. Eagles Jr. (November 10, 1885 – June 7, 1936) was an American college football coach and collegiate mathematics faculty member. He served as the head football coach at Catawba College in Salisbury, North Carolina in 1908, compiling a record of 0–4. Eagles was also as a mathematics professor at the school. Later in his academic career, he was a math professor at Bethany College in Bethany, West Virginia.
