= North Carolina Highway 102 =

State highway in North Carolina, US

North Carolina Highway 102
- Route of NC 102 highlighted in red

Route information
- Maintained by NCDOT
- Length: 22.3 mi (35.9 km)
- Existed: 1924–present

Major junctions
- West end: NC 903 near Ayden
- NC 11 Byp. in Ayden; NC 11 in Ayden; NC 43 in Calico
- East end: US 17 near Hackney

Location
- Country: United States
- State: North Carolina
- Counties: Pitt, Beaufort

Highway system
- North Carolina Highway System; Interstate; US; State; Scenic
← NC 101	→ NC 103

North Carolina Highway 102 (NC 102) is a primary state highway in the U.S. state of North Carolina. It runs from NC 903 near Ayden to US 17 near Hackney between Vanceboro and Chocowinity. Most of the highway is rural, the only town it serves is Ayden.

NC 102 appeared on the first state highway map in 1924, running from Snow Hill to Goldsboro. At its peak, the road stretched from US 17 at its current eastern terminus to US 301 north of Fayetteville. The routing from I-95 to Snow Hill was renumbered as US 13 in 1977, and the segment of the route from its current western terminus to Snow Hill was replaced by an extension of NC 903.

== Route description ==
NC 102 begins at NC 903 west of Ayden. It then heads east until it reaches Ayden. After about two miles (3.2 km), NC 102 enters Ayden, and has an interchange with NC 11 Bypass and then an intersection with NC 11. NC 102 continues through Ayden along 3rd Street, and in the heart of Ayden crosses a CSX rail line. From there NC 102 then continues east out of Ayden still along 3rd Street. After leaving Ayden, NC 102 enters a very rural area with many farms and small forests. About a mile (1.2 km) further east NC 102 has a junction with Ayden Golf Club Road. As NC 102 continues to the east it crosses Fork Swamp and has a junction with County Home Road (Secondary Road 1725, or SR 1725).

About a mile to the east (1.3 km) the road turns to head in a southeastern direction instead of the eastern direction of most of the route. The routing along this part of the road almost parallels NC 43 to the east of the road. 3.7 miles (6.0 km) after the road turned in a southeastern direction. NC 102 intersects Stokestown–St.Johns Road (SR 1753). The road continues across Clayroot Swamp before the intersection with NC 43. The route continues eastward from that intersection and crosses Creeping Swamp and Gorham Swamp before crossing over a railroad owned by Norfolk Southern. Immediately after NC 102 crosses the railroad tracks, it ends at US 17.

== History ==
NC 102 first appeared on the 1924 first official state map running from NC 10 (present day US 70 Business) to NC 12 in Snow Hill. The 1930 North Carolina state map shows that a section of NC 102 was built from NC 60 north of Fayetteville to NC 22 in Sampson County. This section was not connected to the rest of NC 102 which had also been extended south of Goldsboro to Newton Grove. By 1931 the two sections of NC 102 were connected with NC 102 running a short concurrency with NC 23 south of Newton Grove. Between 1931 and 1936, the road was extended to its current eastern terminus at US 17. The road had a short concurrency with US 258 from Snow Hill to three miles (4.8 km) to the northeast. Between 1931 and 1938, NC 102 was rerouted in Goldsboro leaving NC 102A the old route.

In 1941, NC 102 was routed onto US 13 through Newton Grove. Around 1953 the road was routed back onto its original routing through Goldsboro, eliminating NC 102A. Between 1956 and 1957, US 13 was extended along NC 102 from Snow Hill to US 70 east of Goldsboro. In 1958, NC 102 was routed along a freeway around Goldsboro, along with US 70 and US 117. Between 1958 and 1961, NC 102 was routed onto new routing, which is currently US 13. Between the years of 1961 and 1963, the section of routing between US 301 and I-95 was downgraded to a secondary road. During the same time the routing between I-95 and Snow Hill was renumbered as US 13. In 1977, NC 102 was truncated to its current western terminus. The routing it left behind was used to extend NC 903. The routing of NC 102 has stayed the same since 1977.

== Major intersections ==
County	Location	mi	km	Destinations	Notes
Pitt		0.0	0.0	NC 903 – Snow Hill, Winterville	
Pitt	Ayden	2.1	3.4	NC 11 Byp. – Greenville, Kinston	Exit 113 of NC 11 Bypass
Pitt	Ayden	2.3	3.7	NC 11 – Kinston, Greenville	
Pitt	Calico	14.6	23.5	NC 43 – Vanceboro, Greenville	
Beaufort		22.3	35.9	US 17 – New Bern, Washington	
1.000 mi = 1.609 km; 1.000 km = 0.621 mi

== Special routes ==
=== Goldsboro alternate route ===
North Carolina Highway 102A
- Location: Goldsboro, North Carolina
- Existed: 1938–1953

North Carolina Highway 102A (NC 102A) was established between 1931–38 as a renumbering of NC 102, from Chestnut Street, along George and Ash Streets, ending at Center Street. It also shared a concurrency with US 70/NC 111 along Ash Street. By 1953, it was decommissioned in favor of US 117-A and NC 102.
