= North Carolina Highway 30 =

State highway in Pitt County, North Carolina, US

North Carolina Highway 30
- NC 30 highlighted in red

Route information
- Maintained by NCDOT
- Length: 15.0 mi (24.1 km)
- Existed: August 1, 1975–present

Major junctions
- West end: US 13 / NC 11 near Bethel
- NC 903 in Stokes
- East end: US 264 in Pactolus

Location
- Country: United States
- State: North Carolina
- Counties: Pitt

Highway system
- North Carolina Highway System; Interstate; US; State; Scenic
← US 29	→ NC 32

North Carolina Highway 30 (NC 30) is a 15-mile-long (24 km) primary state highway in the U.S. state of North Carolina. NC 30 runs from US 13 and NC 11 near Bethel to NC 33 near Pactolus. While signed east–west, the highway physically travels along a southeast–northwest alignment. NC 30 is primarily a two-lane rural highway which serves communities northeast of Greenville entirely in Pitt County.

There have been three designations of NC 30 since the inception of the North Carolina State Highway system. The first NC 30 was an original state highway. At its greatest extent, it ran from the South Carolina state line west of Seaside to the Virginia state line near Corapeake, North Carolina. The current NC 30 was established on August 1, 1975, running along its modern-day routing. The highway replaced a segment of NC 33 which was rerouted to US 13 in Greenville.

== Route description ==
The western terminus of NC 30 is located at an at-grade intersection with US 13 and NC 11 in a rural area south of Bethel. The highway begins by travelling southeast along a two-lane highway. NC 30 crosses a railroad line owned by CSX Transportation at an at-grade crossing in the unincorporated community of Whitehurst. The highway continues through a rural region with farms and forests until reaching Stokes. Residential buildings line the highway as it enters into Stokes from the northwest. In the center of the community, NC 30 intersects NC 903 which continues southwest to Greenville and north to Robersonville. NC 30 exits Stokes to the southeast, continuing through a predominantly rural residential area. The highway makes a slight adjustment to the south north of Briery Creek Road, an orientation it maintains for the remainder of its route. NC 30 continues southeast of Briery Creek Road for 5.5 miles (8.9 km) until reaching its eastern terminus at US 264. As it approaches its eastern terminus, NC 30 makes a sweeping curve toward the east, until quickly making a turn to the southeast and intersecting US 264. The intersection lies to the east of the community of Pactolus which is located adjacent to US 264.

The North Carolina Department of Transportation (NCDOT) measures average daily traffic volumes along many of the roadways it maintains. In 2018, average daily traffic volumes along NC 30 varied from 1,400 vehicles per day southeast of Staton Mill Road and 2,000 vehicles per day southeast of NC 903, southeast of Briery Swamp Road, and southeast of Carl Morris Road. No section of NC 30 is included in the National Highway System, a network of highways in the United States which serve strategic transportation facilities. However, the highway does connect to the National Highway System at its termini, US 13 and NC 11 south of Bethel and US 264 near Pactolus.

== History ==
=== Previous designations ===
North Carolina Highway 30
- Location: South Carolina state line–Virginia state line
- Existed: 1922–1940

Two previous highways bore the NC 30 designation. The first was one of North Carolina's original 1922 state highways. As a multiple of "10" it was a major cross-state route, connecting Wilmington to the Virginia state line via Jacksonville, New Bern, Washington, and Ahoskie. In 1930, it was extended to South Carolina via Supply. When the U.S. Highways came in 1934–1935, much of it was replaced by US 17. It was rerouted several times in the late 1930s, but was fully gone by 1940. The remnants of the first NC 30 found in eastern Onslow County continue to serve as a key thoroughfare between Jacksonville and Unincorporated Onslow County, the road is known as "Old 30", "Old Highway 30", and "R.I.P. Road".

North Carolina Highway 30
- Location: Greenville–Pactolus
- Existed: 1948–1975

The second NC 30 was created in 1948, connecting Greenville to Pactolus. On August 1, 1975, NC 33 was rerouted to replace NC 30 in its entirety. Today, this route is NC 33 inside of the Greenville Loop and US 264 outside of the loop.

=== Current designation ===
NC 30 was established on August 1, 1975, running between US 13/NC 11 near Bethel, North Carolina and NC 33 near Pactolus. The highway replaced the routing of NC 33 along that segment, and NC 33 was rerouted to follow former NC 30 to US 13 in Greenville. The route has remained the same since.

== Major intersections ==
The entire route is in Pitt County.

Location	mi	km	Destinations	Notes
	0.0	0.0	US 13 / NC 11 – Greenville, Bethel	Western terminus
Stokes	7.9	12.7	NC 903 – Robersonville	
Pactolus	15.0	24.1	US 264 – Greenville, Washington	Eastern terminus
1.000 mi = 1.609 km; 1.000 km = 0.621 mi

== Special routes ==
=== Windsor–Ahoskie alternate route ===
North Carolina Highway 30A
- Location: Windsor–Ahoskie, NC
- Length: 18 mi (29 km)
- Existed: 1933–1939

North Carolina Highway 30A (NC 30A) was an alternate route of NC 30 which existed between 1933 and 1941. The southern terminus of NC 30A was located at NC 30 6 miles (9.7 km) north of Windsor in Bertie County. From its southern terminus, the highway continued northward for 11 miles (18 km) to Powellsville where it intersected NC 350. NC 30A continued north for 6 miles (9.7 km), entering into Hertford County and Ahoskie. The alternate route reached its northern terminus at NC 30A in Ahoskie.

NC 30A first appeared on North Carolina state transportation maps in 1933 running along a topsoil, sand-clay, or gravel road between NC 30 north of Windsor and NC 30 in Ahoskie. By 1938, the section between Ahoskie and Powellsville was paved. NC 30A last appeared on the 1938 North Carolina state transportation map and was decommissioned by 1939.
