= Calico, North Carolina =

- Unincorporated community
- Location within North Carolina Location within the United States
- Country: United States
- State: North Carolina
- County: Pitt
- Elevation: 39 ft (12 m)
- Time zone: UTC-5 (Eastern (EST))
  - Summer (DST): UTC-4 (EDT)
- GNIS feature ID: 1006154

Calico is an unincorporated community in Pitt County, North Carolina, United States. It is located 15 miles (24 km) south of Greenville along North Carolina Highway 102.

== History ==
A post office called Calico was established in 1882, and remained in operation until 1902. Calico was so named on account of the community being a trading point where calico was sold.
