= Walstonburg, North Carolina =

- Town
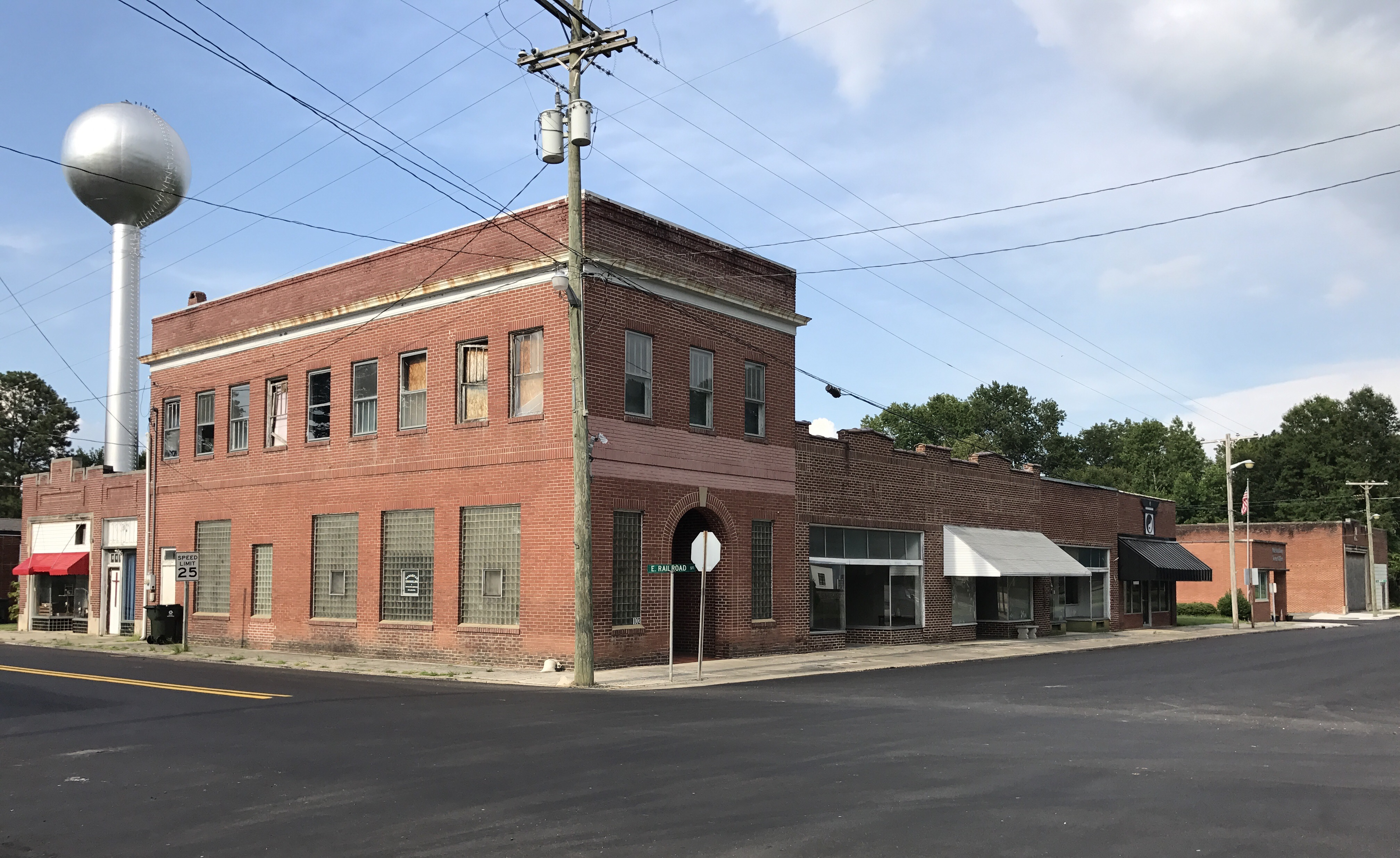

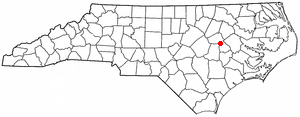
- Location of Walstonburg, North Carolina
- Coordinates: 35°35′46″N 77°41′53″W
- Country: United States
- State: North Carolina
- County: Greene

Area
  - Total: 0.41 sq mi (1.05 km^{2})
  - Land: 0.41 sq mi (1.05 km^{2})
  - Water: 0 sq mi (0.00 km^{2})
- Elevation: 115 ft (35 m)

Population (2020)
  - Total: 193
  - Density: 474.3/sq mi (183.13/km^{2})
- Time zone: UTC-5 (Eastern (EST))
  - Summer (DST): UTC-4 (EDT)
- ZIP code: 27888
- Area code: 252
- FIPS code: 37-70860
- GNIS feature ID: 2406829

Walstonburg is a town in Greene County, North Carolina, United States. The population was 193 at the 2020 census. It is located north of Snow Hill on North Carolina Highway 91. The town is part of the Greenville Metropolitan Area.

== History ==
The Titus W. Carr House and Speight-Bynum House are listed on the National Register of Historic Places.

== Geography ==
Walstonburg is located in northern Greene County. North Carolina Highway 91 leads south 10 miles (16 km) to Snow Hill, the Greene County seat, and north 1 mile (1.6 km) to U.S. Route 264 Alternate, which in turn leads east 22 miles (35 km) to Greenville and northwest 15 miles (24 km) to Wilson.

According to the United States Census Bureau, Walstonburg has a total area of 0.41 square miles (1.05 km^{2}), all land.

== Demographics ==
Historical population
Census	Pop.	Note	%±
1910	127		—
1920	158		24.4%
1930	178		12.7%
1940	198		11.2%
1950	177		−10.6%
1960	191		7.9%
1970	176		−7.9%
1980	181		2.8%
1990	188		3.9%
2000	224		19.1%
2010	219		−2.2%
2020	193		−11.9%
U.S. Decennial Census

As of the census of 2000, there were 224 people, 91 households, and 66 families residing in the town. The population density was 546.5 inhabitants per square mile (211.0/km^{2}). There were 101 housing units at an average density of 246.4 per square mile (95.1/km^{2}). The racial makeup of the town was 81.25% White, 15.62% African American, 2.23% from other races, and 0.89% from two or more races. Hispanic or Latino of any race were 2.23% of the population.

There were 91 households, out of which 27.5% had children under the age of 18 living with them, 60.4% were married couples living together, 7.7% had a female householder with no husband present, and 26.4% were non-families. 25.3% of all households were made up of individuals, and 7.7% had someone living alone who was 65 years of age or older. The average household size was 2.46 and the average family size was 2.90.

In the town, the population was spread out, with 23.2% under the age of 18, 6.3% from 18 to 24, 34.8% from 25 to 44, 23.2% from 45 to 64, and 12.5% who were 65 years of age or older. The median age was 37 years. For every 100 females, there were 109.3 males. For every 100 females age 18 and over, there were 102.4 males.

The median income for a household in the town was $36,875, and the median income for a family was $41,750. Males had a median income of $24,063 versus $22,250 for females. The per capita income for the town was $19,571. About 11.1% of families and 13.3% of the population were below the poverty line, including 4.0% of those under the age of eighteen and 6.9% of those 65 or over.

== Education ==
The town is served by the Greene County Schools system, with five schools located in nearby Snow Hill.

== Transportation ==
The closest airport to Walstonburg is Pitt-Greenville Airport (IATA: PGV, ICAO: KPGV, FAA LID: PGV) with service to Charlotte Douglas International Airport, although most residents use Raleigh-Durham International Airport for domestic and international travel.

Highways that run through the area include NC 121 and NC 91. The closest interstate is I-95, located 17 miles (27 km) to the west in Wilson.

== Notable people ==
- Theodore Blue Edwards, former professional basketball player who competed in the NBA
- Eddie Lee Mays, the last person to be executed in New York
