= Scranton, North Carolina =

- Unincorporated community
- Location within North Carolina Location within the United States
- Coordinates: 35°29′50″N 76°27′05″W
- Country: United States
- State: North Carolina
- County: Hyde
- Elevation: 0 ft (0 m)
- Time zone: UTC-5 (Eastern (EST))
  - Summer (DST): UTC-4 (EDT)
- ZIP code: 27875
- Area code: 252
- GNIS feature ID: 94440

Scranton is an unincorporated community in Hyde County, North Carolina, United States. The community is located along U.S. Route 264 near the Pungo River, 9.3 miles (15.0 km) northwest of Swan Quarter. Scranton has a post office with ZIP code 27875.
