= Middlesex, North Carolina =

- Town
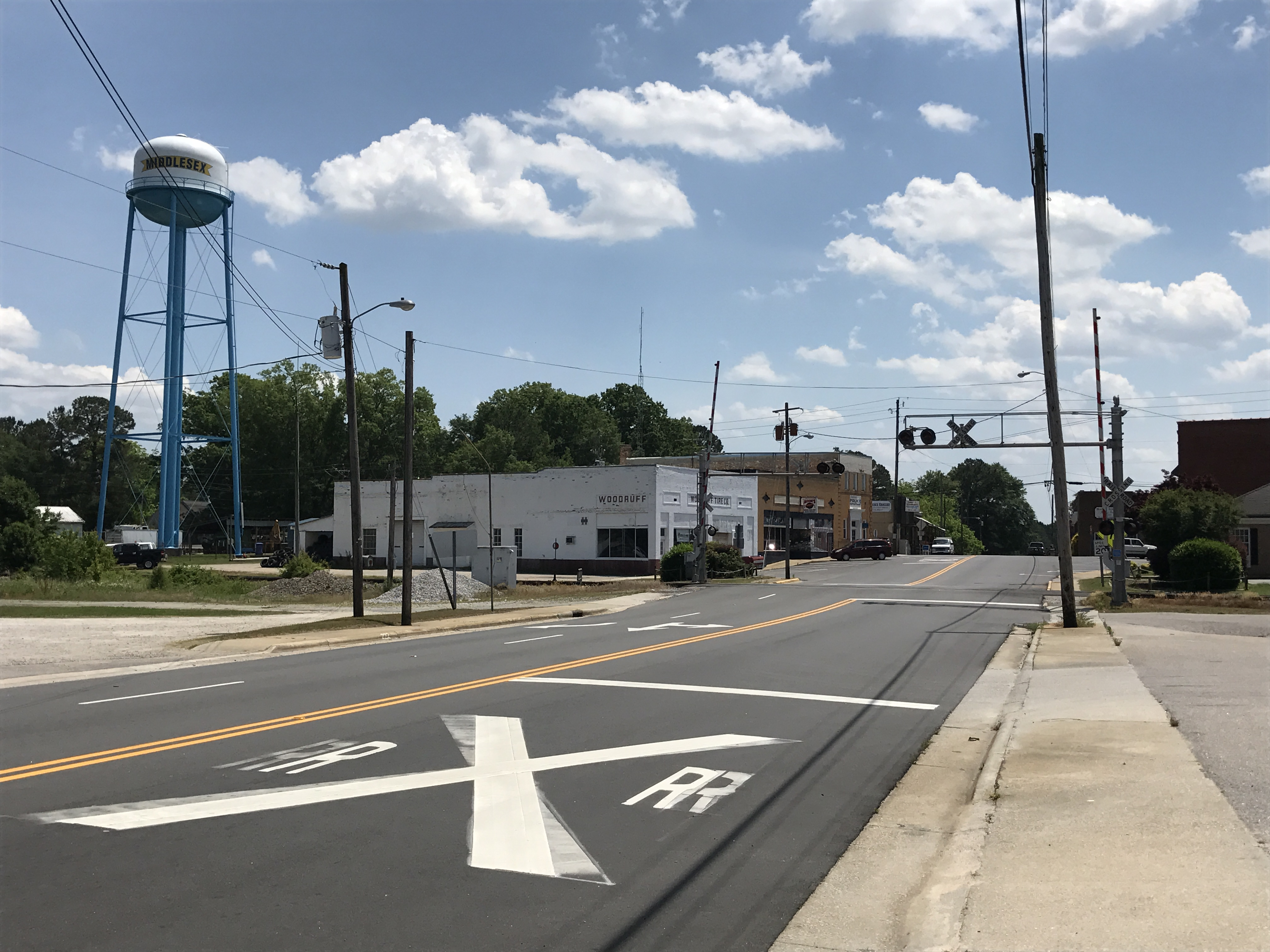

- Location in Nash County and the state of North Carolina.
- Coordinates: 35°47′22″N 78°12′17″W
- Country: United States
- State: North Carolina
- County: Nash

Area
  - Total: 1.05 sq mi (2.71 km^{2})
  - Land: 1.05 sq mi (2.71 km^{2})
  - Water: 0 sq mi (0.00 km^{2})
- Elevation: 259 ft (79 m)

Population (2020)
  - Total: 912
  - Density: 872.6/sq mi (336.92/km^{2})
- Time zone: UTC-5 (Eastern (EST))
  - Summer (DST): UTC-4 (EDT)
- ZIP code: 27557
- Area code: 252
- FIPS code: 37-42700
- GNIS feature ID: 2406157
- Website: www.townofmiddlesexnc.com

Middlesex is a town in Nash County, North Carolina, United States. It is part of the Rocky Mount, North Carolina Metropolitan Statistical Area. Middlesex is about 25 miles east of Raleigh. As of the 2020 census, Middlesex had a population of 912.

== Geography ==
According to the United States Census Bureau, the town has a total area of 1.0 square mile (2.6 km^{2}), all land.

== Demographics ==
Historical population
Census	Pop.	Note	%±
1910	467		—
1920	697		49.3%
1930	559		−19.8%
1940	545		−2.5%
1950	446		−18.2%
1960	588		31.8%
1970	729		24.0%
1980	837		14.8%
1990	730		−12.8%
2000	838		14.8%
2010	822		−1.9%
2020	912		10.9%
U.S. Decennial Census

As of the census of 2000, there were 838 people, 381 households, and 235 families residing in the town. The population density was 858.6 inhabitants per square mile (331.5/km^{2}). There were 426 housing units at an average density of 436.5 per square mile (168.5/km^{2}). The racial makeup of the town was 63.25% White, 32.70% African American, 0.24% Native American, 3.58% from other races, and 0.24% from two or more races. Hispanic or Latino of any race were 7.52% of the population.

There were 381 households, out of which 27.0% had children under the age of 18 living with them, 41.2% were married couples living together, 16.8% had a female householder with no husband present, and 38.1% were non-families. 34.6% of all households were made up of individuals, and 18.1% had someone living alone who was 65 years of age or older. The average household size was 2.20 and the average family size was 2.81.

In the town, the population was spread out, with 23.3% under the age of 18, 10.3% from 18 to 24, 25.1% from 25 to 44, 23.2% from 45 to 64, and 18.3% who were 65 years of age or older. The median age was 38 years. For every 100 females, there were 87.9 males. For every 100 females age 18 and over, there were 82.2 males.

The median income for a household in the town was $21,458, and the median income for a family was $26,488. Males had a median income of $23,182 versus $19,886 for females. The per capita income for the town was $13,717. About 21.4% of families and 21.8% of the population were below the poverty line, including 30.3% of those under age 18 and 23.5% of those age 65 or over.

== Notable people ==
- Sam Narron, Major League Baseball catcher and longtime coach
- Dennis Nielsen, retired United States Air Force Colonel who participated in the rescue efforts of the United Airlines Flight 232 crash in Sioux City, Iowa in 1989
