= List of Interstate Highways in North Carolina =

Interstate Highways of North Carolina
- Highway shields for I-40, I-485, and I-95 Bus. Loop
- Interstate Highways highlighted in red; future sections in blue; unbuilt sections in orange; related state highways in purple

System information
- Maintained by NCDOT
- Length: 1,410 mi (2,270 km)

Highway names
- Interstates: Interstate XX (I-XX)
- Business Loop: Interstate XX Business Loop (I-XX Bus.)

System links
- North Carolina Highway System; Interstate; US; State; Scenic

There are 22 Interstate Highways—9 primary and 13 auxiliary—that exist entirely or partially in the U.S. state of North Carolina. As of January 2020, the state had a total of 1,410 miles (2,270 km) of Interstates and 70 miles (110 km) of Interstate business routes, all maintained by the North Carolina Department of Transportation (NCDOT).

== Primary Interstates ==
Number	Length (mi)	Length (km)	Southern or western terminus	Northern or eastern terminus	Formed	Removed	Notes
I-26	53.67	86.37	I-26/US 23 at the Tennessee state line I-40/I-240/US 74 in Asheville	US 19/US 23 near Forks of Ivy I-26 at the South Carolina state line	1966	current	Gap in Asheville, signed as Future I-26
I-40	419.40	674.96	I-40 at the Tennessee state line	US 117/NC 132 in Wilmington	1958	current	
I-42	31.5	50.7	I-40/NC 540 near Garner US 70 in Goldsboro	US 70 Bus. near Clayton US 70 in La Grange	2024	current	Designation along parts of US 70 east of Raleigh, will eventually extend along US 70 to Morehead City
I-73	121.52	195.57	US 220 near Ellerbe	US 220 in Summerfield	1997	current	One segment currently open between Greensboro and Ellerbe; scheduled to be extended to Virginia and South Carolina borders
I-74	155.01	249.46	I-77 at the Virginia state line northwest of Pine Ridge US 52 in Rural Hall US 74 Alt./US 74 Bus. in Maxton	US 52 in Mount Airy US 74 Bus. northwest of Hamlet US 74/NC 41 near Lumberton	1997	current	Three open segments in Mount Airy, Piedmont Triad and Laurinburg areas; will be continuous once completed
I-77	102.31	164.65	I-77/US 21 at the South Carolina state line	I-77 at the Virginia state line northwest of Pine Ridge	1965	current	
I-85	231.23	372.13	I-85 at the South Carolina state line	I-85 at the Virginia state line	1958	current	
I-87	12.6	20.3	I-40/US 64 in Raleigh	US 64/US 264 in Wendell	2017	current	Future designated along US 64 and US 17 to Norfolk, Virginia
I-95	181.71	292.43	I-95 at the South Carolina state line	I-95 at the Virginia state line	1958	current	

== Auxiliary Interstates ==
Number	Length (mi)	Length (km)	Southern or western terminus	Northern or eastern terminus	Formed	Removed	Notes
I-140	25.40	40.88	US 17 near Winnabow	I-40/NC 140 in Murraysville	2008	current	
I-240	9.14	14.71	I-26/I-40/US 74 in Asheville	I-40/US 74A in Asheville	1980	current	
Future I-274	16.83	27.09	US 158 in Winston-Salem	I-74/I-285/US 52 in Winston-Salem	proposed	—	NCDOT proposed designation along the western segment of the Winston-Salem Northern Beltway
I-277	4.41	7.10	I-77/US 21/US 74 in Charlotte	I-77/US 21/NC 16 in Charlotte	1981	current	
I-285	23.00	37.01	I-85/US 29/US 52/US 70 in Lexington	I-40/US 52/NC 8 in Winston-Salem	2018	current	Ground mounted signs November 2018 along US 52
I-295	33.3	53.6	I-95 near Parkton	I-95/US 13 in Eastover	2019	current	Completed in November 2025
I-440	16.40	26.39	I-40/US 1/US 64 in Raleigh	I-40/US 64 in Raleigh	1991	current	
I-485	67.60	108.79	Beltway around Charlotte		1988	current	
I-495	4.09	6.58	I-440/US 64/US 64 Bus. in Raleigh	I-540/US 64/US 264 in Knightdale	2013	2017	Was originally planned to continue along US 64 to Rocky Mount; replaced by I-87
I-540	27.30	43.94	I-40/NC 540 near Durham	I-87/US 64/US 264 in Knightdale	1997	current	Northern (untolled) half of the Raleigh Outer Loop; partially completed (toll) southern half designated NC 540
I-587	37.00	59.55	I-95/I-795/US 264 in Wilson	US 264 / NC 11 Bypass in Greenville	2022	current	Current and future designation along US 264
Future I-685	—	—	I-85/US 421 near Greensboro	I-95 near Dunn	proposed	—	Established in the Infrastructure Investment and Jobs Act, with designation approved in May 2022.
I-785	7.00	11.27	I-40/I-85 in Greensboro	US 29 in Greensboro	2013	current	Future designation along US 29 to Danville, Virginia
I-795	25.40	40.88	US 70 in Goldsboro	I-95/US 264 in Wilson	2007	current	Eventually to extend to I-40 near Faison
I-840	21.10	33.96	I-40/I-73/US 421 in Greensboro	I-40/I-85/I-785 in Greensboro	2011	current	Northern half of Greensboro Urban Loop
I-885	8.40	13.52	I-40 in RTP	I-85 in Durham	2022	current	
Former; Proposed and unbuilt

== Business routes ==
Number	Length (mi)	Length (km)	Southern or western terminus	Northern or eastern terminus	Formed	Removed	Notes
I-40 BL	18.50	29.77	I-40/US 421 in Winston-Salem	I-40/US 421 in Colfax	1992	2020	Was a freeway-grade business loop
I-40 BL	16.40	26.39	I-40/US 1/US 64 in Raleigh	I-40/US 64/US 70/US 401 in Raleigh	—	1991	Was a freeway-grade, unsigned, designated business loop along the northern half of the Raleigh beltway; replaced by I-440
I-85 BL	29.80	47.96	I-85/US 29/US 52/US 70 in Lexington	I-85/US 29/US 70 in Greensboro	1984	2019	Was an Expressway-grade business loop
I-95 BL	16.00	25.75	I-95 in Hope Mills	I-95 in Eastover	1978	current	Boulevard-grade business loop
I-95 BL	44.60	71.78	I-95/US 301 in Kenly	I-95 near Battleboro	1978	1986	Was a boulevard-grade business loop
Former
