= North Carolina Highway 2A =

Former highway in North Carolina

North Carolina Highway 2A

- Map of NC 2A c. 1950

Route information
- Maintained by North Carolina State Highway Commission
- Length: 0.75 mi (1,210 m)
- Existed: c. 1949–c. 1952

Major junctions
- South end: US 1 in Manly
- North end: NC 2 in Southern Pines

Location
- Country: United States
- State: North Carolina
- Counties: Moore

Highway system
- North Carolina Highway System; Interstate; US; State; Scenic
← NC 2	→ NC 3

North Carolina Highway 2A (NC 2A) was a state highway located in southern Moore County, in the U.S. state of North Carolina. The highway traveled from an intersection with U.S. Route 1 (US 1), now May Street, northward through portions of Manly and Southern Pines to an intersection with NC 22 (now US 1). The highway was first listed as part of the Moore County road system by at least 1930. The route was improved to a paved surface by 1936. NC 2A was numbered sometime between 1945 and 1949. By 1952, it was cancelled and Highway 2 was designated over the route. It has since been numbered Secondary Road 2029 (SR 2029).

== Route description ==
In 1951, NC 2A started at an at-grade intersection with US 1 (North May Street) in the southern portion of the community of Manly. From there, the highway ran northwesterly across the Seaboard Air Line Railroad to an intersection with a primitive trail (now Clark Street) in Southern Pines. The roadway continued northwestward to a bridge over a small, unnamed creek (now nonexistent). Turning slightly westward, the road proceeded to its northern terminus, an intersection with NC 2 (now an interchange with US 1).

== History ==
By 1930, a highway in the location of NC 2A was added to the Moore County Highway System as a class C road, a county highway of the lowest importance. The entire length of the route was graded with an earthen surface, as was much of the highway system. During the mid-1930s, the route was designated as a primary county highway. The route was shifted slightly northerly and had been extended to approximately 0.9 miles (1.4 km) in length, as well as being improved to an asphalt surface. Between then and 1938, the route's southern terminus was shifted southward and the entire length of the highway was resurfaced as bituminous. Between 1945 and 1949, NC 2A was designated along Yadkin Road as a connector route between NC 2 and US 1. During that same period the route was also slightly straightened near its southern terminus. By 1952, NC 2A was decommissioned and replaced by NC 2. The road was shortened to 0.74 miles (1.19 km) in length, and its entire length was paved. NC 2's route was replaced by NC 22. By the next year, Yadkin Road has been shifted to its current location. Before 1972, NC 2 was rerouted away from Yadkin Road and the route had been designated as SR 2029.

== Major intersections ==
The entire highway was in Moore County.

Location	mi	km	Destinations	Notes
Manly	0.00	0.00	US 1 (N May Street) – Voss	Southern terminus; now unnumbered
Southern Pines	0.10	0.16	Clark Street	Present-day SR 2023/SR 2097
Southern Pines	0.75	1.21	NC 2 (Midland Road)	Northern terminus; now US 1
1.000 mi = 1.609 km; 1.000 km = 0.621 mi
