= List of state highways in North Carolina =

North Carolina Highway System
- NC primary state route shields

System information
- Length: 79,328 mi (127,666 km)
- Notes: Largest state-maintained highway network in the United States; state roads maintained by the NCDOT.

Highway names
- Interstates: Interstate X (I-X)
- US Highways: U.S. Highway X (US X)
- State: North Carolina Highway X (NC X)

System links
- North Carolina Highway System; Interstate; US; State; Scenic

State highways in North Carolina are owned and maintained by the U.S. state of North Carolina, through the North Carolina Department of Transportation (NCDOT).

== List of primary routes ==
When originally established in the 1920s, the state highway system was highly organized: two-digit routes ending in "0" were major cross-state routes, other two digit routes were numbered as spurs off of the main route (that is, Highway 54 would have been a spur off of Highway 50) and lesser important routes were given three digit numbers by appending an extra "ones" digit to the two digit route it branched off of (that is, Highway 541 would have been itself a spur off of Highway 54).

Since its establishment, there have been countless small changes to the state highway numbering system as routes are eliminated, combined, or renumbered. There have been four events that have forced large numbers of routes to be changed: 1933–1934 elimination of duplicate and renumbering of state routes along or that share with U.S. Routes, 1937 renumbering for contiguous routes with South Carolina, 1940 renumbering for contiguous routes with Virginia and 1961 renumbering of routes that share with Interstate highways in the state. Because of these renumbering events, the original numbering system has been largely obscured.

Number	Length (mi)	Length (km)	Southern or western terminus	Northern or eastern terminus	Formed	Removed	Notes
NC 2	5.5	8.9	NC 5 in Pinehurst	US 1 in Southern Pines	1934	current	
NC 3	2.2	3.5	US 158 near Grandy	Boat launch and lot in Poplar Beach	1934	2002	First form; renumbered NC 136 in a numbering swap to honor Dale Earnhardt
NC 3	27.0	43.5	US 601 in Concord	NC 152 in Mooresville	2002	current	Second form
NC 4	34.7	55.8	US 301 in Rocky Mount	US 158/NC 903 in Littleton	1934	current	
NC 5	8.3	13.4	Bethesda Road in Aberdeen	NC 211 in Pinehurst	1934	current	
NC 6	—	—	US 264 north of Swanquarter	NC 94 southwest of Fairfield	1933	1934	First form; became part of NC 94
NC 6	—	—	US 264 east of Swanquarter	NC 94 southwest of Fairfield	1934	1942	Second form; former portion of NC 94; decommissioned when NC 94 was rerouted over the bridge (the old route is now secondary road 1305); now Turnpike Road (secondary road 1304)
NC 6	—	—	US 52 in New London	NC 49	1947	1953	Third form; former NC 49A; became part of NC 8
NC 6	7.9	12.7	I-40/US 421 in Greensboro	I-40/I-85 Bus. in Greensboro	1959	2004	Fourth form; downgraded to secondary road
NC 7	12.1	19.5	US 321 in Gastonia	US 29/US 74 in Belmont	1932	current	
NC 8	94.6	152.2	US 52 in New London	SR 8 at the Virginia state line	1930	current	
NC 9	—	—	US 70 in Durham	US 70 in Raleigh	1930	1937	First form, redesignated as an extended US 70 Alternate; now Miami Boulevard, NC 54, Durham Road, and Chatham Street
NC 9	46.5	74.8	SC 9 at the South Carolina state line	Montreat Road in Montreat	1938	current	Second form
NC 10	48.3	77.7	NC 226 in Polkville	I-40 near Catawba	1921	current	Most of original route (except Newton to Catawba) replaced by US 19, US 70, and NC 81 in 1934; extended southwest later
NC 11	193.2	310.9	US 74/US 76 in Bolton	US 258/US 158 Bus. in Murfreesboro	1921	current	
NC 12	—	—	Kinston	Pollockville	1921	1958	First form, became part of an extended NC 58; section from Kinston to Murfreesboro replaced by US 258 and section from Murfreesboro to Virginia replaced by US 158 (now US 258) in 1934
NC 12	148.0	238.2	US 70 in Sea Level	North Beach Access Ramp in Corolla	1962	current	Second form, a National Scenic Byway
NC 13	—	—	Virginia state line	US 70 in Durham	1921	1930	First form, became part of an extended NC 55 (now US 501)
NC 13	—	—	US 15/NC 56 in Creedmoor	US 70 in Raleigh	1934	1936	Second form, became part of US 15 Alternate (now NC 50)
NC 13	24.5	39.4	US 220 near Seagrove	US 421 in Staley	1936	1951	Third form; downgraded to secondary road because US 13 extended into the state.
NC 14	17.1	27.5	US 158 near Yanceyville	SR 86 at the Virginia state line	1921	1940	First form; renumbered NC 86 to match Virginia
NC 14	17.1	27.5	US 29 near Reidsville	SR 87 at the Virginia state line	1940	current	Second form
NC 15	60.3	97.0	SC 163 at the South Carolina state line	US 70/NC 10/NC 80 in Salisbury	1921	1934	Replaced by US 29 and NC 49 because of US 15.
NC 16	143.8	231.4	NC 75 in Waxhaw	SR 16 at the Virginia state line	1921	current	Prior to 1934, went south from Conover via what is now US 321 Business and US 321; re-extended south from Conover in 1940; prior to 1940, followed what is now NC 88 from Jefferson to Tennessee
NC 17	55.9	90.0	NC 113 in Propst Crossroads	US 221/US 421/NC 60 in Boone	1921	1934	Replaced by US 321 and an extended NC 96 because of US 17.
NC 18	145.5	234.2	SC 18 at the South Carolina state line	NC 89 in Lowgap	1921	current	
NC 19	112.8	181.5	US 176 at the South Carolina state line	US 19W/US 23 at the Tennessee state line	1921	1934	Replaced by US 19W/US 23, NC 26, US 221, NC 181, and US 176 because of US 19.
NC 20	—	—	Tennessee state line	Wrightsville	1921	1934	First form; replaced by US 70 and US 74
NC 20	28.6	46.0	US 401 Bus./NC 211 in Raeford	NC 87 near Tar Heel	1934	current	Second form
NC 21	155.7	250.6	US 17/NC 20 near Delco	US 15/NC 75 in Creedmoor	1921	1934	Replaced by US 15, NC 13 and NC 28 because of US 21.
NC 22	—	—	South Carolina border	US 117/NC 40 near Wilson	1921	1934	First form; replaced by US 301
NC 22	59.4	95.6	NC 2 in Southern Pines	NC 62 in Climax	1934	current	Second form
NC 23	159.4	256.5	US 701 at the South Carolina state line	NC 62 in Louisburg	1921	1934	Replaced by US 701 and NC 39 because of US 23.
NC 24	278.0	447.4	I-485 in Charlotte	US 70 in Morehead City	1921	current	Longest state highway. Until 1934, went southwest from Fayetteville via what is now US 401 and US 15 rather than northwest; rerouted on different route that year, truncated in 1940, and extended to Charlotte in 1962/1963.
NC 25	14.2	22.9	SC 12 at the South Carolina state line	US 74/NC 20 in Monroe	1921	1934	Replaced by NC 75 because of US 25.
NC 26	—	—	VA 26 at the Virginia state line	SC 26 at the South Carolina state line	1921	1934	First form; replaced by US 21 and US 521
NC 26	101.4	163.2	US 29 in Grover	SR 107 at the Tennessee state line	1934	1961	Second form; replaced by NC 226 because of I-26.
NC 27	198.0	318.7	NC 10 in Toluca	US 301/NC 50/NC 242 in Benson	1921	current	
NC 28	—	—	Tennessee state line	Twin Oaks	1921	1934	First form; replaced by US 64, US 70, and US 221
NC 28	—	—	Fayetteville	Delco	1934	1937	Second form; renumbered NC 87
NC 28	81.2	130.7	SR 28 at the Georgia state line	US 129 in Deals Gap	1938	current	Third form
NC 29	—	—	Tennessee state line	South Carolina state line	1921	1928	First form; replaced by NC 311, NC 31, and an extended NC 69; after 1934, this became NC 36 (now US 23 Alternate), US 19, and US 25
NC 29	12.1	19.5	NC 16 in Gastonia	US 74/NC 20 in Belmont	1930	1932	Second form; replaced by NC 7 because of US 29.
NC 30	—	—	US 158 (now US 258) in Murfreesboro	NC 170 in Barco	1921	1941	First form; replaced by US 158; west end was at Windsor via what became NC 97 (now US 13) until 1940; continued to the South Carolina border via what is now US 17 until 1934
NC 30	—	—	US 13 in Greenville	NC 33 in Pactolus	1948	1975	Second form; replaced by US 264; number reassigned to portion of NC 33, which was rerouted over the old route of US 264
NC 30	15.0	24.1	US 13/NC 11 in Bethel	US 264 in Pactolus	1975	current	Third form
NC 31	—	—	NC 213 in Mars Hill	US 19/NC 69 east of Mars Hill	1928	1934	First form; replaced by rerouted NC 213 (now SR 1609)
NC 31	0.5	0.80	South Street in Raleigh	Central Prison in Raleigh	1944	1978	Second form
NC 32	103.5	166.6	US 17 Bus. in Washington	SR 32 at the Virginia state line	1921	current	
NC 33	109.6	176.4	NC 4/NC 48 near Red Oak	Hobucken School Road in Hobucken	1929	current	
NC 34	—	—	NC 168 in Sligo	US 158 in Barco	1921	1979	First form; replaced by rerouted NC 168 and number reused for old route of NC 168; until 1940, continued northwest to Virginia border and southeast to Manteo
NC 34	9.2	14.8	US 158 near Camden	NC 168 near Currituck	1979	current	Second form
NC 35	20.5	33.0	US 158 (now US 258) in Murfreesboro	US 17 near Merry Hill	1930	1940	First form; replaced by rerouted NC 30 (which became part of rerouted US 158 in 1941) and rest renumbered NC 45
NC 35	20.5	33.0	NC 305 near Woodland	SR 35 at the Virginia state line	1940	current	Second form
NC 36	4.5	7.2	Tennessee state line	US 19/US 23 near Mars Hill	1934	1952	First form; replaced by rerouted US 23 (now US 23 Alternate)
NC 36	4.5	7.2	US 19/US 23 near Mars Hill	US 23 near Mars Hill	1952	1975	Second form; downgraded to secondary road
NC 36	10.59	17.04	NC 50/NC 42 in Garner	US 70 Bus/NC 42 in Clayton	2025	current	Third form; renumbering of NC 42 in Clayton to avoid confusion with I-42
NC 37	48.3	77.7	US 64 in St. Johns	US 13 in Drum Hill	1934	current	
NC 38	—	—	US 17 in Folkstone	Old Ferry Road in Sneads Ferry	1934	1937	First form; renumbered NC 86
NC 38	5.5	8.9	SC 38 at the South Carolina state line	US 74 Bus. in Hamlet	1937	current	Second form
NC 39	78.6	126.5	US 70/US 301/NC 96 in Selma	SR 719 at the Virginia state line	1934	current	
NC 40	204	328	Carolina Beach	Virginia state line	1921	1934	First form; replaced by US 117, US 421, and US 301.
NC 40	—	—	Buies Creek	Benson	1937	1957	Second form; replaced by NC 27.
NC 40	47.9	77.1	Oak Island Drive in Oak Island	NC 210 in Bells Crossroads	1957	1961	Third form; replaced by NC 133 because of I-40.
NC 41	141.1	227.1	SC 41 at the South Carolina state line	US 70 in Cove City	1928	current	
NC 42	223.3	359.4	I-73/I-74/US 220 in Asheboro	NC 45 in Colerain	1921	current	Clayton portion of the route to be redesignated as NC 36
NC 43	119.8	192.8	US 17/US 70 in New Bern	NC 58 in Warrenton	1928	current	
NC 44	—	—	NC 4/NC 48 near Red Oak	NC 11/NC 42 in Oak City	1930	1994	First form; replaced by NC 33 and NC 111
NC 44	9.8	15.8	US 70 near Goldsboro	Wayne Memorial Drive near Goldsboro	2011	2016	Second form; replaced by US 70 Byp.
NC 45	—	—	NC 305 near Woodland	SR 35 at the Virginia state line	1930	1940	First form; renumbered NC 35 to match Virginia
NC 45	121.7	195.9	NC 12 in Ocracoke	US 13/US 158 near Winton	1940	current	
NC 46	16.9	27.2	VA 46 at the Virginia state line	US 301 near Garysburg	1930	current	
NC 47	—	—	US 158 in Ocracoke	US 301 in Pleasant Hill	1934	1952	First form; replaced by rerouted NC 48
NC 47	24.3	39.1	I-85 Bus./US 29/US 52/US 70 in Lexington	NC 49 near Denton	1972	current	Second form
NC 48	—	—	Mocksville	Winton	1921	1934	First form; replaced by US 158 and NC 35 (this section now also part of US 158)
NC 48	53.5	86.1	US 301 Bus. in Rocky Mount	US 301 in Pleasant Hill	1934	current	Second form; prior to 1952, followed what is now NC 561, SR 1312 (Long Bridge Road/Old NC 48) and NC 4 north of Brinkleyville
NC 49	177.8	286.1	SC 49 at the South Carolina state line	SR 49/SR 96 at the Virginia state line	1934	current	
NC 50	—	—	South Carolina state line	Virginia state line	1921	1934	First form; replaced by US 1
NC 50	164.2	264.3	Florida Avenue in Topsail Beach	US 15/NC 56 in Creedmoor	1935	current	Second form
NC 51	—	—	Ellerbe	Wadeville	1921	1934	First form; replaced by NC 73 and NC 109
NC 51	22.2	35.7	SC 51 at the South Carolina state line	NC 24 in Mint Hill	1934	current	Second form
NC 53	126.7	203.9	NC 24/NC 210 in Fayetteville	Gum Branch Road in Jacksonville	1923	current	Section from Fayetteville to Jonesboro became part of NC 24 in 1934
NC 54	—	—	Moncure	Pittsboro	1921	1928	First form; now Moncure-Pittsboro Road
NC 54	55.0	88.5	US 70/NC 62 in Graham	I-440/US 1 in Raleigh	1929	current	Second form
NC 55	—	—	Wake Forest	Durham	1929	1930	First form; replaced by NC 91 (later NC 264; now NC 98)
NC 55	193.0	310.6	US 501 Bus. in Durham	Oriental Road in Oriental	1930	current	section from Durham to Virginia replaced by US 501 and section from Erwin to Godwin replaced by NC 82 in 1934
NC 56	42.8	68.9	Central Avenue in Butner	NC 58 in Castalia	1921	current	
NC 57	43.2	69.5	NC 86 in Hillsborough	NC 62 in Milton	1921	current	
NC 58	176.0	283.2	Fort Macon State Park near Atlantic Beach	US 401/US 158 Bus.	1921	current	
NC 59	—	—	Raleigh	Warrenton	1932	1957	First form; replaced by US 401
NC 59	8.3	13.4	I-95 in Hope Mills	US 401 Bus. in Fayetteville	1958	2022	Second form; downgraded to SR 1596
NC 60	—	—	Tennessee state line	Castle Hayne	1921	1934	First form; replaced by US 421
NC 60	5.1	8.2	SR 60 Spur at the Georgia state line	US 64/US 74 near Ranger	1934	current	Second form
NC 61	19.7	31.7	NC 62 near Alamance	NC 150 in Osceola	1930	current	Prior to 1940, continued southwest to Thomasville via what is now NC 62
NC 62	84.4	135.8	NC 109 in Thomasville	SR 62 at the Virginia state line	1921	current	Prior to 1940, followed what is now NC 49 from Burlington to Mt. Pleasant
NC 63	26.9	43.3	NC 209 in Trust	US 19/US 23/US 74A in Asheville	1929	current	
NC 64	—	—	Lexington	Winston-Salem	1921	1925	First form; replaced by NC 66 (later US 52; now NC 8 and Old US 52)
NC 64	53.2	85.6	NC 74 near Carthage	US 421/NC 60 in Greensboro	1932	1934	Second form; replaced by NC 22 because of US 64.
NC 65	—	—	Lexington	Roxboro	1921	1931	First form; replaced by NC 48 (now US 158)
NC 65	49.0	78.9	US 52 in Rural Hall	Scales Street in Reidsville	1934	current	Second form
NC 66	—	—	Lexington	Virginia state line	1921	1931	First form; replaced by US 52
NC 66	47.0	75.6	I-40 in Horneytown	NC 89 in Johnstown	1934	current	Second form
NC 67	—	—	Conover	Sparta	1921	1929	First form; replaced by NC 16 and NC 18
NC 67	41.3	66.5	US 21 Bus. in Jonesville	NC 150 in Winston-Salem	1930	current	Second form
NC 68	—	—	Tennessee State Line	Millers Creek	1921	1929	First form; replaced by NC 16 (one portion now part of NC 88)
NC 68	30.8	49.6	I-85 Bus./US 29/US 70 in Thomasville	US 220 in Stokesdale	1930	current	Second form
NC 69	—	—	Georgia State Line	Tennessee State Line	1921	1934	First form; replaced by US 25, US 19, and US 19E
NC 69	3.9	6.3	SR 17/SR 515 at the Georgia state line	US 64 Bus. in Hayesville	1941	current	Second form
NC 70	191.0	307.4	SC 94 at the South Carolina state line	US 29 at the Virginia state line	1921	1934	Replaced by US 29, US 220, NC 2, NC 41, NC 72 and NC 211 because of US 70.
NC 71	27.1	43.6	US 74 Bus./NC 130 in Maxton	US 301 near Parkton	1928	current	Previously continued southeast to US 74 in Orrum via what is now NC 130
NC 72	—	—	Fairmont	Orrum	1930	1931	First form; replaced by NC 71 (now NC 130)
NC 72	32.9	52.9	NC 211 in Red Springs	US 74 near Orrum	1934	current	Second form
NC 73	118.5	190.7	NC 27 in Boger City	US 15/US 501 near Pinehurst	1934	current	
NC 74	—	—	NC 271 near Denver	US 15/NC 75 in Carthage	1921	1934	First form; replaced by extended NC 27 east of Albemarle and rest renumbered NC 73 because of US 74.
NC 74	—	—	US 158 in Walkertown	US 421/NC 150 in Kernersville	2020	2026	Second form, designated as I-74
NC 75	—	—	Virginia state line	Rockingham	1921	1934	First form; replaced by US 15, NC 2, NC 73, and US 220
NC 75	12.8	20.6	SC 75 at the South Carolina state line	NC 200 in Monroe	1934	current	Second form
NC 77	—	—	Virginia state line	Randleman	1921	1934	First form; replaced by US 220 and US 311 (south section now I-74 and SR 2270)
NC 77	16.1	25.9	SC 77 at the South Carolina state line	US 1 near Hoffman	1934	1961	Second form; replaced by NC 177 because of I-77.
NC 78	10.6	17.1	NC 79 in Gibson	US 74 Bus. in Hamlet	1934	1940	Renumbered NC 381 to match South Carolina
NC 78	4.6	7.4	US 1/US 15/US 501 in Tramway	US 421/NC 42/NC 87 in Sanford	1940	current	Second form
NC 79	8.7	14.0	SC 79 at the South Carolina state line	US 15/US 401/US 501/US 74 Bus. in Laurinburg	1934	current	
NC 80	—	—	Mount Airy	Virginia state line	1921	1940	First form; renumbered NC 103 to match Virginia; previously continued south to the South Carolina border; this section is now part of US 601 and US 52
NC 80	40.1	64.5	US 70 in Pleasant Gardens	NC 226 in Bakersville	1940	current	Second form
NC 81	4.2	6.8	US 25/NC 55 in Asheville	US 70 in Asheville	1934	current	
NC 82	16.0	25.7	US 421 in Erwin	US 13 in Cooper	1934	current	
NC 83	7.3	11.7	SC 83 at the South Carolina state line	NC 130 in Seven Bridges	1937	current	
NC 84	11.5	18.5	NC 16 in Weddington	NC 200 in Monroe	1938	current	
NC 85	13.6	21.9	SC 85 at the South Carolina state line	US 74 near Pee Dee	1937	1961	Replaced by NC 145 because of I-85.
NC 86	—	—	Folkstone	New River	1937	1940	First form; renumbered NC 172
NC 86	53.4	85.9	US 15/US 501/NC 54 in Chapel Hill	SR 86 at the Virginia state line	1940	current	Second form
NC 87	236.8	381.1	NC 211 in Southport	SR 87 at the Virginia state line	1937	current	
NC 88	41.3	66.5	SR 67 at the Tennessee state line	NC 18 in Laurel Springs	1938	current	
NC 89	61.1	98.3	US 311 in Walnut Cove	SR 89 at the Virginia state line	1921	current	
NC 90	71.5	115.1	Edgemont Road in Edgemont	US 21/US 64 in Statesville	1921	current	
NC 91	—	—	Durham	Zebulon	1921	1941	First form; renumbered NC 264 (now NC 98 and NC 96); continued east via what is now US 264 to Englehard until 1934
NC 91	12.2	19.6	US 13/US 258/NC 903 in Snow Hill	US 264 near Walstonburg	1947	current	Second form
NC 92	20.7	33.3	US 264/US 17 Bus. in Washington	NC 99/NC 306 in Gaylord	1926	current	
NC 93	—	—	Pittsboro	Burlington	1929	1940	First form; replaced by NC 87 and NC 54
NC 93	—	—	Tramway	Burlington	1940	1940	Second form; renumbered NC 78
NC 93	9.9	15.9	SR 93 at the Virginia state line	US 221 in Twin Oaks	1940	current	Third form
NC 94	73.3	118.0	NC 45 in Swan Quarter	NC 32 in Edenton	1930	current	
NC 95	59.0	95.0	US 64/US 264 in Zebulon	NC 122 in Hobgood	1930	1961	Replaced by NC 97 because of I-95.
NC 96	—	—	Taylorsville	Propst Crossroads	1930	1940	First form; renumbered NC 127
NC 96	107.0	172.2	NC 55 in Newton Grove	SR 49/SR 96 at the Virginia state line	1940	current	Second form
NC 97	—	—	Plymouth	Bunyan	1921	1940	First form; replaced by NC 32
NC 97	—	—	Virginia state line	Windsor	1940	1952	Second form; replaced by US 13
NC 97	64.4	103.6	US 64 Bus. in Wendell	NC 122 in Hobgood	1961	current	Third form
NC 98	—	—	Wilson	Snow Hill	1930	1931	First form; replaced by NC 58
NC 98	43.7	70.3	US 15 Bus./US 70 Bus./US 501 Bus. in Durham	US 64 Alt./NC 231 in Spring Hope	1934	current	Second form
NC 99	—	—	Bunyan	NC 97 (now Old 97 Rd)	1935	1938	First form; replaced by NC 97 (now NC 32)
NC 99	—	—	NC 97 (now NC 32)	Pantego	1938	1940	Second form; downgraded to secondary road
NC 99	33.0	53.1	NC 92/NC 306 in Gaylord	NC 32/NC 45 near Plymouth	1940	current	Third form
NC 100	—	—	US 70/NC 10 in Whitsett	US 70/NC 10 in Burlington	1930	1932	First form; became part of NC 10/US 70
NC 100	—	—	US 70/NC 10 in Whitsett	US 70/NC 10 in Burlington	1930	1932	Second form; became NC 10-A (Now NC 100)
NC 100	12.0	19.3	US 70 in Whitsett	NC 49/NC 54 in Burlington	1934	current	Third form
NC 101	—	—	NC 10 near Havelock	Morehead City	1921	1928	First form; replaced by NC 10/US 70
NC 101	22.2	35.7	US 70 in Havelock	US 70 in Beaufort	1928	current	Second form
NC 102	22.3	35.9	NC 903 near Ayden	US 17 near Hackney	1921	current	
NC 103	—	—	NC 54 in Swepsonville	NC 144 (now NC 49)	1921	1940	First form; renumbered NC 119
NC 103	8.3	13.4	US 52 Bus./NC 89 in Mount Airy	SR 103 at the Virginia state line	1940	current	Second form
NC 104	—	—	US 70 in Pleasant Gardens	NC 26 (now NC 226) in Bakersville	1921	1940	First form; renumbered NC 80
NC 104	6.0	9.7	NC 103 in Mount Airy	SR 773 at the Virginia state line	1940	current	Second form
NC 105	—	—	US 70 in Nebo	US 221 in Linnville Falls	1921	1954	First form; portions replaced by NC 183 and NC 126; rest downgraded to SR 1238
NC 105	17.7	28.5	US 221 in Linville	US 221/US 421/NC 194 in Boone	1956	current	Second form
NC 106	—	—	South Carolina state line	US 19/23 (now US 23 Bus.) in Sylva	1921	1940	First form; became an extension of NC 107
NC 106	11.2	18.0	SR 246 at the Georgia state line	US 64/NC 28 in Highlands	1940	current	Second form; crosses state line five times.
NC 107	34.8	56.0	SC 107 at the South Carolina state line	US 23 Bus. in Sylva	1921	current	Section from Dillsboro to Tennessee replaced by US 441 in 1952
NC 108	—	—	US 19/NC 10 in Topton	Tennessee state line	1921	1934	Replaced by US 129
NC 108	22.0	35.4	US 176 in Tryon	US 221/US 221A/US 74 Bus. in Rutherfordton	1940	current	Second form
NC 109	105.9	170.4	SC 109 at the South Carolina state line	I-40 in Winston-Salem	1928	current	Section north of Winston-Salem replaced by NC 8 in 1940
NC 110	—	—	NC 10 in Conover	NC 10 near Catawba	1928	1930	replaced by NC 10 to match US 70
NC 110	5.5	8.9	US 276/NC 215 in Woodrow	US 19/US 23 in Canton	1932	current	Second form
NC 111	126.2	203.1	US 258 in Catherine Lake	NC 11/NC 42 in Oak City	1930	current	
NC 112	—	—	US 19 near Wilmot	NC 107 in Cherokee	1930	1938	First form; redesignated as NC 107E (later NC 107; now US 441)
NC 112	3.6	5.8	US 19/US 23 in Asheville	NC 191 in Asheville	1940	current	Second form
NC 113	—	—	NC 18 near Toluca	NC 10/NC 16/US 321 in Newton	1930	1934	First form; renumbered as part of NC 73 (now NC 10)
NC 113	—	—	US 301 in Halifax	US 301 in Halifax	1937	1960	Second form; redesignated as US 301 Business
NC 113	11.2	18.0	NC 18 in Laurel Springs	NC 93 in Piney Creek	1964	current	Third form
NC 114	2.6	4.2	I-40 near Drexel	Oakland Avenue in Drexel	1930	current	
NC 115	71.3	114.7	US 21 in Charlotte	US 421 Bus./NC 18/NC 268 in North Wilkesboro	1930	current	
NC 116	4.1	6.6	US 23/US 441 near Dillsboro	NC 107 in Sylva	1930	current	
NC 117	71.3	114.7	NC 102 in Newton Grove	US 70/NC 10 in Jasper	1931	1934	Replaced by NC 55 because of US 117.
NC 118	18.5	29.8	NC 11 in Grifton	NC 43 in Vanceboro	1932	current	
NC 119	—	—	Montreat	US 64 (now Bat Cave Road/Old US 64)	1930	1940	First form; renumbered as part of NC 9
NC 119	42.9	69.0	NC 54 in Swepsonville	SR 119 at the Virginia state line	1940	current	Second form
NC 120	4.7	7.6	US 221A in Cliffside	US 74 Bus. near Mooresboro	1929	current	
NC 121	—	—	NC 12 in Kinston	NC 24 near Kinston	1930	1934	First form; replaced by US 258; sections were connected by NC 12
NC 121	13.1	21.1	US 264 near Walstonburg	NC 43 in Bruce	1929	current	Second form
NC 122	29.4	47.3	NC 124 in Macclesfield	NC 125 in Hobgood	1931	current	
NC 123	10.2	16.4	NC 58 in Glenfield Crossroads	US 13/US 258 in Lizzie	1932	current	
NC 124	9.2	14.8	NC 42 near Bridgersville	NC 42/NC 43 near Cobbs Crossroads	1933	current	
NC 125	68.7	110.6	Prison Camp Road near Williamston	NC 48 in Roanoke Rapids	1922	current	
NC 126	—	—	US 258/NC 12 near Snow Hill	US 17/NC 30 in Wilmar	1933	1934	First form; replaced by NC 102
NC 126	23.0	37.0	US 70 in Nebo	NC 181 in Morganton	1940	current	Second form
NC 127	24.6	39.6	NC 10 in Propst Crossroads	US 64/NC 90 in Ellendale	1940	current	
NC 128	—	—	NC 12 (now US 258/NC 125) in Scotland Neck	NC 305 in Rich Square	1921	1922	First form; replaced by NC 125 (later NC 12; now US 258)
NC 128	4.6	7.4	Blue Ridge Parkway	Mount Mitchell State Park	1947	current	Second form; highest elevated highway east of the Mississippi River
NC 130	96.0	154.5	US 74 Bus./NC 71 in Maxton	Ocean Boulevard in Holden Beach	c. 1928	current	
NC 131	24.5	39.4	US 701 in Whiteville	NC 87 in Tar Heel	1949	current	
NC 132	15.3	24.6	US 117/NC 133 in Castle Hayne	US 421 near Carolina Beach	1958	current	
NC 133	47.4	76.3	Oak Island Drive in Oak Island	NC 210 in Bells Crossroads	1962	current	
NC 134	19.1	30.7	NC 24/NC 27/NC 109 Bus. in Troy	Dawson Miller Road near Ulah	1968	current	
NC 135	—	—	SR 75 at the Georgia state line	US 64 near Elf	1967	1967	First form; renumbered (probably corrected) to NC 175
NC 135	11.5	18.5	US 220 Bus. in Mayodan	US 311/NC 770 near Eden	1967	current	Second form
NC 136	27.0	43.5	US 601 in Concord	NC 152 in Mooresville	1974	2002	First form; renumbered NC 3 in a numbering swap to honor Dale Earnhardt
NC 136	2.2	3.5	US 158 near Grandy	Boat launch and lot in Poplar Beach	2002	current	Second form
NC 137	8.6	13.8	US 13/US 158 near Winton	NC 37 in Gatesville	1973	current	
NC 138	13.6	21.9	NC 742 in Gatesville	US 52 near Albemarle	1937	current	
NC 140	6.5	10.5	US 17 near Winnabow	US 74/US 76 in Leland	2014	current	Designated as Future I-140
NC 141	—	—	NC 53 near Atkinson	US 74/US 76 near Freeman	1954	1975	First form; replaced by NC 11
NC 141	8.7	14.0	US 64 near Murphy	US 19/US 74/US 129 in Marble	1983	current	Second form
NC 142	9.2	14.8	NC 111 in Fountain Fork	NC 125/NC 903 near Hamilton	1975	current	
NC 143	38.3	61.6	SR 165 at the Tennessee state line	NC 28 near Stecoah	1979	current	A National Scenic Byway
NC 144	—	—	NC 562 (now NC 96) near Virgilina	NC 61	1921	1940	First form; replaced by NC 49 and NC 62
NC 144	—	—	NC 41 near Chinquapin	US 258/NC 24 near Catherine Lake	1984	1984	Second form; replaced by NC 111
NC 144	12.0	19.3	Future I-74/US 74 in Laurel Hill	US 401 in Wagram	2001	current	Third form
NC 145	13.6	21.9	SC 145 at the South Carolina state line	US 74 near Pee Dee	1961	current	
NC 146	3.5	5.6	NC 191 near Avery Creek	US 25 in Skyland	1991	current	
NC 147	15.7	25.3	NC 540 in Morrisville	I-85 in Durham	1987	current	Second form, part of the Triangle Expressway
NC 148	14.5	23.3	US 70 near Kinston	NC 11 near Kinston	2009	current	
NC 149	1.2	1.9	US 64 in Plymouth	Plymouth Pulp Mill in Plymouth	1987	current	
NC 150	183.2	294.8	SC 150 at the South Carolina state line	US 158 near Yanceyville	1929	current	
NC 151	—	—	US 29 in Concord	South Carolina state line	1925	1951	First form; replaced by US 601
NC 151	11.83	19.04	Blue Ridge Parkway	US 19/US 23 in New Candler	1963	current	Second form
NC 152	25.5	41.0	NC 150 in Mooresville	US 52 in Rockwell	1930	current	
NC 153	2.9	4.7	NC 152 near Landis	Main Street in Landis	1930	current	
NC 155	29.4	47.3	NC 275/NC 279 in Dallas	US 70 in Conover	1994	1999	Replaced by US 321 Bus.
NC 157	29.3	47.2	I-85/US 15/US 70/US 501 in Durham	US 158/US 501/NC 57 in Roxboro	1947	current	
NC 159	7.3	11.7	US 220 Alt. near Seagrove	US 64/NC 49 in Asheboro	1975	current	
NC 160	14.9	24.0	SC 160 at the South Carolina state line	NC 49 in Charlotte	1942	current	
NC 161	—	—	Virginia state line	NC 16 (now NC 88) in Warrensville	1930	1937	First form; renumbered NC 162
NC 161	10.6	17.1	SC 161 at the South Carolina state line	NC 274 in Bessemer City	1937	current	Second form
NC 162	—	—	Virginia state line	NC 88 in Warrensville	1930	1937	First form; replaced by NC 194
NC 162	7.5	12.1	US 401 in Fayetteville	I-95 Bus./US 301 in Hope Mills	2007	current	Second form
NC 163	9.1	14.6	US 221 Bus./US 221/NC 194 in West Jefferson	NC 16 near Glendale Springs	c. 1961	current	
NC 168	18.3	29.5	US 158 in Barco	SR 168 at the Virginia state line	c. 1958	current	
NC 170	—	—	US 15/NC 75 (now NC 73) near Norman	US 311 (now US 220)/NC 70 in Candor	1929	1934	First form; replaced by US 220 (became ALT US 220 when I-73/US 220 was built)
NC 170	—	—	US 158 in Belcross	SR 170 at the Virginia state line	1935	1958	Second form; replaced by NC 168
NC 171	—	—	Edgemont	US 321/NC 17 near Lenoir	1929	1934	First form; replaced by NC 90
NC 171	17.2	27.7	US 17 in Old Ford	US 64 Bus. in Jamesville	c. 1936	current	Second form
NC 172	—	—	US 64 (now NC 94) near Skinnersville	US 17 near Hertford	1938	1940	First form; replaced by NC 32 and NC 37
NC 172	25.2	40.6	US 17 near Holly Ridge	NC 24 in Starling	c. 1940	current	Second form
NC 175	—	—	NC 194 in Skinnersville	NC 17 in Blowing Rock	1929	1930	First form; replaced by NC 181 and NC 691 (now US 221)
NC 175	4.1	6.6	SR 75 at the Georgia state line	US 64 near Elf	1967	current	Second form
NC 176	—	—	NC 181 in Pineola	NC 175 (now US 221) in Linnville	c. 1928	1930	Replaced by NC 181 (now also US 221); route number not reused because of US 176.
NC 177	16.1	25.9	SC 177 at the South Carolina state line	US 1 near Hoffman	1961	current	
NC 179	16.2	26.1	SC 179 at the South Carolina state line	US 17 Bus./NC 130 in Shallotte	1979	current	
NC 180	—	—	NC 26 (now NC 226) in Polkville	NC 18 in Fallston	1934	1952	First form; renumbered NC 182
NC 180	12.0	19.3	NC 26 near Patterson Springs	NC 18 in Shelby	c. 1952	current	Second form
NC 181	36.2	58.3	US 64 Bus./US 70 Bus./NC 18 in Morganton	NC 194 in Newland	c. 1928	current	
NC 182	—	—	NC 26 (now NC 226) in Polkville	NC 18 in Bellwood	1930	1938	First form; mostly replaced by NC 27 (now NC 10) and eastern section downgraded to SR 1621 and an extension of SR 1614 in exchange for extending NC 27 on a route further north
NC 182	23.3	37.5	NC 226 in Polkville	NC 27 near Lincolnton	c. 1952	current	Second form
NC 183	4.5	7.2	US 221 in Linville Falls	NC 181 near Jonas Ridge	c. 1930	current	
NC 184	—	—	Boiling Springs	NC 18 in Shelby	1930	1940	First form; replaced by NC 150
NC 184	10.3	16.6	NC 105 in Sugar Mountain	Pinnacle Ridge Road in Beech Mountain	1956	current	Second form
NC 186	23.4	37.7	NC 48 near Gaston	SR 186 at the Virginia state line	1975	current	
NC 190	—	—	—	—	1930	1940	Replaced by NC 26
NC 191	21.6	34.8	US 25 in Hendersonville	US 19 Bus./US 23 Bus. in Hendersonville	1921	current	Previously continued southeast to NC 19 (now NC 108); this section is now part of US 176
NC 192	20.3	32.7	SC 9 at the South Carolina state line	US 74 in Lake Lure	1928	1937	First form, replaced by NC 9
NC 192	—	—	I-40 in Winston-Salem	I-74 in Union Cross	2026	current	Second form, designated in 2019.
NC 194	85.4	137.4	US 19E in Ingalls	Rugby Road at the Virginia state line	1921	current	
NC 195	—	—	—	—	c. 1938	1975	Replaced by NC 186
NC 197	65.0	104.6	Future I-26/US 19/US 23 near Flat Creek	SR 395 at the Tennessee state line	1921	current	
NC 198	4.3	6.9	SC 198 at the South Carolina state line	NC 180 near Patterson Springs	c. 1952	current	
NC 200	50.1	80.6	SC 200 at the South Carolina state line	US 601 near Concord	c. 1930	current	
NC 201	—	—	NC 20 (now US 74) in Belville	Southport	1921	1928	First form; replaced by NC 30 (now US 17) and NC 130 (now NC 211)
NC 201	—	—	NC 22/US 301 in Lumberton	NC 24 in Jacksonville	1928	1934	Second form; replaced by NC 41 and NC 53
NC 202	—	—	NC 20/US 74 in Chadbourn	South Carolina state line	1921	1934	Replaced by US 76
NC 203	—	—	NC 20/US 74 near Laurinburg	South Carolina state line	1921	1934	Replaced by NC 79
NC 204	—	—	NC 50/US 1 near Marston	South Carolina state line	1921	1934	Replaced by NC 77
NC 205	—	—	NC 20/US 74 in Kings Mountain	South Carolina state line	1921	1934	First form; replaced by US 29
NC 205	22.0	35.4	US 74 in Marshville	NC 24/NC 27 in Red Cross	c. 1934	current	Second form
NC 206	—	—	NC 20/US 74 in Shelby	NC 27 in Lincolnton	1921	1931	First form; replaced by NC 150
NC 206	—	—	NC 20/US 74 in Hamlet	NC 203 (now NC 79) in Gibson	1931	1934	Second form; replaced by NC 78
NC 207	—	—	NC 20/US 74 in Forest City	South Carolina state line	1921	1934	First form; replaced by US 221
NC 207	13.0	20.9	SC 207 at the South Carolina state line	US 74/US 601/NC 200 in Monroe	c. 1948	current	Second form
NC 208	9.1	14.6	US 25/US 70 in Hurricane	SR 70 at the Tennessee state line	1921	current	
NC 209	36.6	58.9	US 19/US 23/US 74/US 23 Bus. in Lake Junaluska	US 25/US 70 in Hot Springs	1921	current	
NC 210	—	—	NC 20 near Paint Rock	Tennessee state line near Paint Rock	1924	1926	First form
NC 210	20	32	NC 60 in Erwin	NC 21 in Cardenas	1929	1931	Second form; replaced by NC 55
NC 210	195.0	313.8	US 17 in Sneads Ferry	US 70 Bus. in Smithfield	1931	current	Third form
NC 211	162.5	261.5	US 421 in Fort Fisher	US 220 Alt./NC 731 in Candor	1921	current	
NC 212	14.2	22.9	NC 208 in Belva	SR 352 at the Tennessee state line	1926	current	
NC 213	14.9	24.0	Walnut Drive in Walnut	Future I-26/US 19/US 23 in Mars Hill	c. 1928	current	Continued west to NC 63, and then west to NC 209 prior to 1951
NC 214	17.00	27.36	US 74 Bus./US 76 Bus. near Whiteville	US 74/US 76 near Bolton	c. 1933	current	
NC 215	—	—	SC 161 at the South Carolina state line	US 74 in Kings Mountain	1930	1937	Renumbered NC 161 to match South Carolina
NC 215	29.0	46.7	US 64 near Rosman	I-40/US 74 in Canton	1967	current	Second Form
NC 216	15.7	25.3	SC 216 at the South Carolina state line	NC 274 near Tryon	1930	current	
NC 217	9.8	15.8	US 401 near Linden	US 421/NC 55 in Erwin	c. 1933	current	
NC 218	31.6	50.9	NC 51 in Mint Hill	US 74 in Polkton	1935	current	
NC 220	—	—	NC 102 in Newton Grove	NC 91 in Zebulon	1928	1930	Replaced by NC 23 (now US 701, US 301, and NC 39)
NC 220	28.2	45.4	US 217/NC 22 in Saint Pauls	NC 21 in Duart	1931	1934	Second form; replaced by NC 20 because of US 220.
NC 221	21.2	34.1	NC 102/NC 117 in Newton Grove	NC 55 in Coats	1934	1934	Replaced by NC 50 because of US 221.
NC 222	57.8	93.0	NC 231 near Emit	NC 33 near Belvoir	1934	current	
NC 225	10.6	17.1	US 25 near Tuxedo	US 25 Bus./US 176 in Hendersonville	1997	current	
NC 226	101.0	162.5	US 29 in Grover	SR 107 at the Tennessee state line	1961	current	
NC 231	—	—	NC 21/NC 23 in Elizabethtown	NC 20/US 17 in Acme	1934	1934	First form; replaced by NC 21 (now NC 87).
NC 231	25.4	40.9	US 64 Bus. in Wendell	US 64 Alt./NC 98 near Spring Hope	1935	current	Second form
NC 241	—	—	NC 60 in Jonesboro	NC 24 in Fayetteville	1923	1924	First form; replaced by NC 53 (now NC 87).
NC 241	—	—	NC 70 (now NC 211) in Aberdeen	NC 71 (now NC 130) in Raemon	1930	1934	Second form; replaced by US 501
NC 241	9.4	15.1	NC 24/NC 41/NC 111 in Beulaville	NC 11 in Pink Hill	1971	current	Third form
NC 242	94.2	151.6	US 76 in Cerro Gordo	I-40 near Benson	1930	current	
NC 243	6.5	10.5	NC 24 in Hubert	Pier access in Swansboro	1931	1934	Replaced by NC 24
NC 251	17.5	28.2	Future I-26/US 19/US 23/US 70 in Asheville	US 25/US 70 near Marshall	1980	current	
NC 260	9.9	15.9	SR 93 at the Virginia state line	US 221 in Twin Oaks	1935	1940	Replaced by NC 93
NC 261	—	—	NC 26/US 521 (now Polk St) in Pineville	South Carolina state line	1921	1934	First form; replaced by US 21 (now NC 51).
NC 261	12.8	20.6	NC 226 in Bakersville	SR 143 at the Tennessee state line	1952	current	Second form
NC 262	22.4	36.0	NC 25 in Waxhaw	US 74 in Charlotte	1930	1940	Replaced by NC 16
NC 264	44.5	71.6	US 15/US 501/NC 55 in Durham	US 64/US 264 in Zebulon	1941	1952	Replaced by NC 96 and NC 98
NC 268	90.3	145.3	US 321 near Happy Valley	NC 89 near Moores Springs	1921	current	
NC 271	—	—	—	—	1926	1940	Replaced by NC 16
NC 272	—	—	—	—	1930	1931	First form; downgraded to secondary road
NC 272	—	—	—	—	1931	1935	Second form; downgraded to secondary road
NC 273	18.8	30.3	NC 279 near Belmont	NC 16 Bus. in Lucia	1930	current	
NC 274	37.1	59.7	SC 274 at the South Carolina state line	NC 27 in Hulls Crossroads	1930	current	
NC 275	10.7	17.2	NC 274 near Bessemer City	NC 27 in Stanley	1930	current	
NC 276	20.6	33.2	NC 26 in Pineville	NC 27 near Mint Hill	1930	1934	Replaced by NC 51 because of US 276.
NC 277	12.5	20.1	NC 150 in Cherryville	NC 275 in Dallas	1931	1979	Replaced by NC 279 because of I-277.
NC 279	28.6	46.0	NC 150 in Cherryville	Pole Branch Road at the South Carolina state line	1979	current	
NC 280	18.2	29.3	US 64/US 276 in Brevard	US 25/US 25A in Arden	1931	current	
NC 281	36.6	58.9	SC 130 at the South Carolina state line	NC 107 in Tuckasegee	1930	current	
NC 282	—	—	—	—	1930	c. 1937	Replaced by NC 28
NC 283	—	—	—	—	1923	c. 1937	Replaced by US 178
NC 284	—	—	—	—	1921	1969	Replaced by US 276
NC 285	—	—	—	—	1921	1934	Replaced by US 23
NC 286	—	—	—	—	1921	c. 1938	Replaced by NC 28
NC 287	—	—	—	—	1923	1941	Replaced by NC 69
NC 288	—	—	—	—	1929	1944	First form; downgraded to secondary road (western portion restored, see below); portions submerged by Lake Fontana
NC 288	—	—	—	—	c. 1951	1954	Second form; replaced by NC 28
NC 289	—	—	—	—	1930	c. 1939	Downgraded to secondary road
NC 291	—	—	—	—	1930	c. 1935	Downgraded to secondary road
NC 292	—	—	—	—	1931	c. 1939	Downgraded to secondary road
NC 293	—	—	—	—	1931	1947	Replaced by US 19A (became part of rerouted US 19 the next year)
NC 294	13.3	21.4	SR 123 at the Tennessee state line	US 64/US 74 near Ranger	1931	current	
NC 295	7.0	11.3	US 401 in Fayetteville	I-95/US 13 in Eastover	2011	2019	First form; replaced by I-295
NC 295	5.7	9.2	Cliffdale Road in Fayetteville	All American Freeway in Fayetteville	2020	2020	Second form; replaced by I-295
NC 295	5.7	9.2	Parkton Road in Parkton	Black Ridge Road in Hope Mills	2022	2025	Third form; replaced by I-295
NC 301	—	—	NC 11/NC 40 in Kenansville	NC 30 in Jacksonville	1921	1925	First form; replaced by NC 24.
NC 301	—	—	US 17/NC 30 in Vanceboro	NC 91 in Jacksonville	1928	1931	Second form; replaced by NC 43.
NC 301	5.5	8.9	US 17/NC 30 in Folkstone	Old Ferry Road in Sneads Ferry	1932	1934	Third form; replaced by NC 38 because of US 301.
NC 302	—	—	—	—	1921	1940	Replaced by NC 55
NC 303	—	—	—	—	1921	1925	First form; replaced by NC 12
NC 303	—	—	—	—	1930	1952	Second form; replaced by NC 87
NC 304	15.2	24.5	NC 55 in Bayboro	Hobucken School Road in Hobucken	1923	current	
NC 305	44.7	71.9	US 13 in Windsor	NC 55 in Bayboro	1921	current	
NC 306	45.3	72.9	NC 101 in Havelock	NC 92/NC 99 in Gaylord	1930	current	
NC 307	1.4	2.3	NC 304 in Hollyville	First Street in Vandemere	1930	current	
NC 308	52.9	85.1	US 258/NC 561 in Rich Square	NC 32 in Pleasant Grove	1933	current	
NC 311	12.4	20.0	NC 31 in Mars Hill	SR 81 at the Tennessee state line	1930	1934	Replaced by NC 36 because of US 311.
NC 321	—	—	—	—	1921	1934	Replaced by NC 37 because of US 321.
NC 341	—	—	—	—	1921	1934	Replaced by US 17
NC 342	—	—	—	—	1921	1934	Replaced by US 17
NC 343	25.5	41.0	Wharf Road in Old Trap	US 17 in South Mills	1930	current	
NC 344	—	—	—	—	c. 1921	c. 1935	First form; replaced by NC 34
NC 344	21.0	33.8	Weeks Drive in Glen Cove	US 17 Byp. in Elizabeth City	2006	current	Second form
NC 345	4.9	7.9	Thicket Lump Drive in Wanchese	US 64/US 64 Byp. in Manteo	1921	current	
NC 346	—	—	—	—	c. 1930	c. 1931	Replaced by NC 344
NC 350	—	—	—	—	1933	1975	Replaced by NC 42
NC 381	10.6	17.1	SC 381 at the South Carolina state line	US 74 Bus. in Hamlet	1940	current	
NC 400	0.6	0.97	US 64 in Manteo	Roanoke Island Festival Park in Manteo	1985	current	Shortest state highway.
NC 401	—	—	—	—	1930	1940	Replaced by NC 11
NC 402	—	—	—	—	1933	1935	Replaced by NC 111
NC 403	25.7	41.4	US 701 Bus. in Clinton	NC 55 in Williams	1932	current	
NC 410	39.6	63.7	SC 410 at the South Carolina state line	NC 87 in Dublin	1936	current	
NC 411	28.0	45.1	NC 242 near Roseboro	US 421/NC 41 in Harrells	1937	current	
NC 417	3.55	5.71	US 17 in Wilmington	NC 140 in Kirkland	2023	current	Temporary designation for US 17 Byp.
NC 422	—	—	—	—	c. 1938	c. 1960	Downgraded to secondary road
NC 452	—	—	US 158 near Clemmons	NC 74 (Future I-74)/US 52 in Bethania	proposed	—	Designated in 1999 along the future western half of the Winston-Salem Northern Beltway; will later be designated as I-274
NC 461	19.1	30.7	NC 561 in Saint John	Nucor Steel near Cofield	1964	current	
NC 481	—	—	Roanoke Rapids	Pleasant Hill	c. 1925	c. 1932	First form; redesignated as NC 40-A
NC 481	21.0	33.8	NC 4/NC 48 in Glenview	NC 561 in Tillery	c. 1937	current	Second form
NC 482	—	—	—	—	1930	1934	Replaced by NC 4
NC 485	—	—	—	—	1922	1927	Replaced by NC 12
NC 500	—	—	—	—	1933	c. 1941	Replaced by NC 98
NC 501	—	—	—	—	1929	1934	Replaced by NC 39 because of US 501.
NC 512	—	—	—	—	1922	1929	Replaced by US 311/NC 170
NC 515	—	—	—	—	1923	1934	Replaced by NC 73 and NC 109
NC 522	5.84	9.40	SC 522 at the South Carolina state line	NC 200 in Roughedge	c. 1951	current	
NC 540	16.4	26.4	NC 55 Byp. in Apex	I-40/I-540 near Morrisville	2008	current	Part of the Triangle Expressway
NC 561	101.0	162.5	US 401/NC 39 in Louisburg	NC 45 in Harrellsville	1925	current	
NC 562	32.2	51.8	NC 56 in Wilton	SR 59 at the Virginia state line	1932	1940	Replaced by NC 96
NC 581	—	—	Bailey	Rocky Mount	1932	1933	first form; partially replaced by NC 95; rest downgraded to secondary road
NC 581	71.8	115.6	NC 111 in Goldsboro	US 401/NC 39/NC 56 in Louisburg	1933	current	second form
NC 601	—	—	—	—	1929	1932	Replaced by NC 201; number not reused because of US 601.
NC 602	—	—	—	—	1929	c. 1950	Downgraded to secondary road
NC 603	—	—	—	—	1931	1961	Replaced by US 321
NC 605	—	—	—	—	1932	1936	Replaced by NC 24
NC 610	2.1	3.4	Main Street in High Point	NC 62 near Archdale	1930	current	
NC 615	14.7	23.7	Princess Anne Road at the Virginia state line	NC 168 in Currituck	c. 1963	current	
NC 630	—	—	—	—	c. 1933	c. 1941	Replaced by NC 191
NC 661	—	—	—	—	1921	1935	Replaced by NC 66
NC 681	—	—	—	—	1928	1940	Replaced by NC 16
NC 690	19.3	31.1	US 1 Bus. in Vass	NC 24/NC 87 in Spring Lake	1999	current	
NC 691	—	—	—	—	1925	1933	Replaced by NC 194
NC 692	—	—	—	—	1923	1934	Replaced by US 19W/US 23
NC 693	—	—	—	—	1930	c. 1941	Downgraded to secondary road
NC 694	6.3	10.1	US 70/US 74A in Asheville	Blue Ridge Parkway	c. 1932	current	
NC 695	—	—	—	—	1932	c. 1941	Replaced by NC 197
NC 700	18.8	30.3	NC 14/NC 87/NC 770 in Eden	US 29 in Pelham	1934	current	
NC 701	—	—	—	—	1930	1934	Replaced by NC 5 because of US 701.
NC 702	—	—	—	—	c. 1922	1935	Replaced by NC 2
NC 703	—	—	—	—	1930	c. 1940	Replaced by NC 150
NC 704	38.7	62.3	NC 89 near Francisco	NC 65 near Wentworth	c. 1930	current	
NC 705	26.0	41.8	NC 211 near Eagle Springs	I-73/I-74/US 220 near Seagrove	c. 1932	current	
NC 708	—	—	—	—	c. 1922	1935	Replaced by NC 704
NC 709	—	—	—	—	c. 1923	c. 1930	Replaced by NC 54
NC 710	20.4	32.8	NC 211 in Red Springs	US 501/NC 130 near Rowland	c. 1935	current	
NC 711	11.7	18.8	I-95/US 301/NC 72 in Lumberton	NC 72 in Pembroke	c. 1952	current	
NC 721	—	—	—	—	c. 1980	1982	Downgraded to secondary road
NC 731	25.9	41.7	US 52 near Norwood	US 220 Alt./NC 211 in Candor	c. 1936	current	
NC 740	12.8	20.6	NC 24/NC 27/NC 73 in Albemarle	US 52 in New London	c. 1930	current	
NC 741	—	—	—	—	1930	1933	First form; downgraded to secondary road
NC 741	—	—	—	—	1935	1941	Second form; replaced by US 221
NC 742	35.9	57.8	SC 742 at the South Carolina state line	NC 205 in Oakboro	1936	current	
NC 751	23.8	38.3	US 64 near Apex	US 70 Bus.	c. 1930	current	
NC 752	1.0	1.6	I-77 near Pine Ridge	NC 89 near Pine Ridge	1994	1998	Replaced by I-74
NC 761	15.6	25.1	US 76 near Fair Bluff	US 701 in Tabor City	c. 1935	1937	Replaced by NC 904
NC 770	29.2	47.0	NC 704 near Sandy Ridge	US 311 at the Virginia state line	c. 1930	current	
NC 771	—	—	US 311 east of Winston-Salem	US 421 in Kernersville	c. 1930	1936	First form; replaced by NC 703 (later NC 150, now downgraded)
NC 771	5.5	8.9	SC 96 at the South Carolina state line	US 74 in Hamlet	c. 1936	1937	Second form; replaced by NC 38
NC 772	10.3	16.6	US 311 near Pine Hall	NC 704 near Prestonville	1933	current	
NC 800	4.6	7.4	US 52 in Mount Airy	SR 200 at the Virginia state line	c. 1931	1940	Replaced by NC 104
NC 801	53.9	86.7	NC 152 in Mooresville	US 601 near Farmington	c. 1928	current	
NC 802	13.6	21.9	SC 95 at the South Carolina state line	US 74 near Pee Dee	c. 1930	1937	Replaced by NC 85
NC 803	25.0	40.2	NC 150 in Mooresville	US 601/NC 80 near Cooleemee	1931	1933	Replaced by NC 801
NC 885	11.5	18.5	I-40 in Research Triangle Park	NC 55 near Morrisville	c. 2022	current	Part of the Triangle Expressway
NC 891	8.7	14.0	NC 89 near Danbury	SR 23 at the Virginia state line	1926	1934	Replaced by NC 109
NC 892	17.3	27.8	NC 66 near Winston-Salem	NC 89 in Meadows	1930	1934	Replaced by NC 109
NC 893	7.5	12.1	NC 89 near Francisco	SR 23 at the Virginia state line	c. 1922	1923	Replaced by NC 661
NC 897	43.4	69.8	NC 60/NC 65 in Winston-Salem	SR 33 at the Virginia state line	1921	1925	Replaced by NC 77
NC 901	19.0	30.6	US 64 near Calahaln	NC 115 near New Hope	c. 1930	current	
NC 902	24.9	40.1	NC 22/NC 42 near Bennett	US 64 Bus./NC 87 in Pittsboro	c. 1930	current	
NC 903	200.0	321.9	NC 411 near Garland	SR 903 at the Virginia state line	1934	current	
NC 904	67.5	108.6	NC 130 in Five Forks	First Street in Ocean Isle Beach	1937	current	
NC 905	20.9	33.6	SC 905 at the South Carolina state line	NC 130 in Pleasant Plains	c. 1958	current	
NC 906	12.4	20.0	Beach Drive in Oak Island	US 17 near Bolivia	2016	current	
Former; Proposed and unbuilt

== List of alternate routes ==
North Carolina alternate routes have been utilized in a multitude of ways, including business, bypass, cut-thru and spurs. After 1960, nearly all have been decommissioned or converted to business loops, and establishing new alternate routes have been prohibited. Today, only three alternate routes are currently active in the state.

Number	Length (mi)	Length (km)	Southern or western terminus	Northern or eastern terminus	Formed	Removed	Notes
NC 2A	—	—	Manly	Southern Pines	c. 1949	c. 1952	Replaced by NC 2
NC 10A	—	—	Conover	Catawba	1930	1934	Downgraded to secondary road
NC 10A	—	—	Gibsonville	Burlington	c. 1932	1934	Replaced by NC 100
NC 10A	—	—	High Point		1933	1934	Downgraded to secondary road
NC 11A	—	—	Kenansville		1940	1960	Downgraded to secondary road
NC 11A	—	—	Kinston		c. 1949	1960	Replaced by NC 11 Bus.
NC 18A	—	—	Lenoir		c. 1949	1960	Replaced by NC 18 Bus.
NC 26A	—	—	Woodlawn	Little Switzerland	c. 1947	1961	Replaced by NC 226A
NC 27A	—	—	Thrift	Charlotte	1932	1936	Replaced by NC 27
NC 27A	—	—	Pee Dee	Wadeville	c. 1960	c. 1968	Downgraded to secondary road
NC 30A	—	—	Windsor	Ahoskie	1933	c. 1941	Replaced by NC 97
NC 36A	—	—	Mars Hill		1938	1952	Replaced by NC 36
NC 40A	—	—	Roanoke Rapids	Pleasant Hill	1932	1934	Replaced by NC 47
NC 49A	—	—	New London		1940	1948	Replaced by NC 6 (which became part of NC 8 in 1953)
NC 49A	—	—	Asheboro	Liberty	1947	1967	Downgraded to secondary road
NC 54A	—	—	Carrboro	Chapel Hill	c. 1957	1960	Replaced by NC 54 Bus.
NC 55A	—	—	Bridgeton		c. 1953	c. 1962	Downgraded to secondary road
NC 62A	—	—	New London		1935	1940	Replaced by NC 49A
NC 69A	—	—	Arden	Asheville	1932	1934	Replaced by US 25
NC 87A	—	—	Fayetteville		c. 1944	c. 1949	Replaced by NC 87
NC 87A	—	—	Fayetteville		c. 1949	c. 1957	Downgraded to secondary road
NC 90A	—	—	Rocky Mount		c. 1932	1934	Replaced by US 64A
NC 95A	—	—	Rocky Mount		c. 1932	1940	Downgraded to secondary road
NC 102A	—	—	Goldsboro		c. 1938	c. 1953	Replaced by US 117A/NC 102
NC 105A	—	—	Nebo	Longtown	1935	1940	Replaced by NC 105
NC 109A	—	—	Troy		c. 1953	1960	Replaced by NC 109 Bus.
NC 109A	—	—	Thomasville		c. 1936	1960	Replaced by NC 109 Bus.
NC 130A	—	—	Shallotte		c. 1944	c. 1962	Downgraded to secondary road
NC 150A	—	—	Lincolnton		c. 1956	1960	Downgraded to secondary road
NC 150A	—	—	Mooresville		c. 1953	c. 1955	Replaced by NC 152
NC 191A	—	—	Asheville		c. 1957	c. 1960	Replaced by US 19 Bus./US 23 Bus.
NC 211A	—	—	Lumberton		c. 1949	c. 1957	Downgraded to secondary road
NC 211A	—	—	Lumberton		c. 1957	1960	Replaced by NC 211 Bus.
NC 226A	12.3	19.8	Woodlawn	Little Switzerland	1961	current	
NC 226A	3.7	6.0	Ledger	Loafers Glory	1996	current	
NC 242A	—	—	Roseboro		1939	1977	Downgraded to secondary road
NC 268A	0.2	0.32	North Wilkesboro		1940	current	Unsigned designation
NC 345A	—	—	Wanchese		c. 1929	c. 1962	Replaced by NC 345
Former

== List of business loops ==
North Carolina business routes were first established in 1960 with the conversation of some alternate routes. All business routes in the state are set up as a loop, meaning it will separate then converge back to the main highway. Typically, they serve to connect downtown areas in cities and towns in the state.

Number	Length (mi)	Length (km)	Southern or western terminus	Northern or eastern terminus	Formed	Removed	Notes
NC 11 Bus.	1.2	1.9	Kinston		1960	c. 2000	Downgraded to secondary road.
NC 11 Bus.	6.3	10.1	Aulander		1978	current	
NC 11 Bus.	5.7	9.2	Bethel		2003	current	
NC 16 Bus.	16.2	26.1	Lucia	Killian Crossroads	2007	current	
NC 16 Bus.	6.6	10.6	Newton	Conover	2007	current	
NC 18 Bus.	2.9	4.7	Lenoir		1960	2008	Downgraded to secondary road
NC 24 Bus.	11.8	19.0	Warsaw	Kenansville	1999	current	
NC 24 Bus.	3.0	4.8	Jacksonville		2006	current	
NC 43 Bus.	5.1	8.2	Rocky Mount		2001	current	
NC 54 Bus.	4.4	7.1	Carrboro	Chapel Hill	1960	1985	Downgraded to secondary road
NC 87 Bus.	6.4	10.3	Elizabethtown		1998	current	
NC 98 Bus.	4.1	6.6	Wake Forest		2011	current	
NC 109 Bus.	1.5	2.4	Troy		1960	2024	Downgraded to secondary road
NC 109 Bus.	3.2	5.1	Thomasville		1960	1971	Downgraded to secondary road
NC 109 Bus.	0.5	0.80	Mount Gilead		1968	current	
NC 130 Bus.	4.5	7.2	Fairmont		1966	current	
NC 130 Bus.	3.0	4.8	Shallotte		2012	current	
NC 143 Bus.	1.0	1.6	Robbinsville		1997	current	
NC 179 Bus.	5.4	8.7	Calabash		2001	current	
NC 211 Bus.	3.4	5.5	Lumberton		1960	1971	Downgraded to secondary road
NC 211 Bus.	5.7	9.2	Bladenboro		1975	current	
NC 268 Bus.	7.8	12.6	Elkin		2002	current	
NC 481 Bus.	1.7	2.7	Enfield		2007	current	
Former

== List of other special routes ==
North Carolina, on rare occasion, will utilize other unique special routes in the state. Listed here are bypass, connector, divided and spur routes.

Number	Length (mi)	Length (km)	Southern or western terminus	Northern or eastern terminus	Formed	Removed	Notes
NC 55 Byp.	4.4	7.1	Apex	Holly Springs	2002	2019	Replaced by NC 55
NC 87 Byp.	8.0	12.9	Sanford		2013	current	
NC 107E	—	—	Cherokee		c. 1938	1940	Replaced by NC 107
NC 11 Byp.	17.9	28.8	NC 11 in Ayden	US 13/NC 11/NC 903 in Greenville	2019	current	
NC 159 Spur	0.7	1.1	North Carolina Zoological Park		1977	current	
NC 345E	—	—	Manteo		c. 1936	c. 1962	Downgraded to secondary road
NC 581 Conn.	0.6	0.97	Goldsboro		2009	current	Unsigned designation
Former
