= North Carolina Highway 78 =

State highway in Lee County, North Carolina, US

North Carolina Highway 78
- Tramway Road / Main Street

Route information
- Maintained by NCDOT
- Length: 4.569 mi (7.353 km)
- Existed: 1940–present

Major junctions
- West end: US 1 / US 15 / US 501 in Tramway
- East end: US 421 Bus. / NC 42 / NC 87 in Sanford

Location
- Country: United States
- State: North Carolina
- Counties: Lee

Highway system
- North Carolina Highway System; Interstate; US; State; Scenic
← I-77	→ NC 79

North Carolina Highway 78 (NC 78) is a primary state highway in the U.S. state of North Carolina. The highway connects the Tramway community with Sanford's Jonesboro Heights neighborhood.

== Route description ==
NC 78 is a 4.6-mile (7.4 km) two-lane highway, traversing from US 1/US 15/US 501 in Tramway, to US 421 Business/NC 42/NC 87 in Jonesboro Heights. The routing provides a southern bypass of downtown Sanford.

== History ==
Established in late 1940 as a renumbering of NC 93, NC 78 went from US 1/US 15/US 501 in Tramway, to US 421 in Jonesboro (today Jonesboro Heights). In 1961, NC 78 was rerouted from its terminus at Main Street and Lee Street (now Lee Avenue), to Woodland Avenue and Lee Street (today Horner Boulevard), in Sanford. By the late 1960s, NC 78 was rerouted again to its current terminus with Horner Boulevard.

Originally, the first NC 78 existed from 1934-1940, traversing from NC 79 in Gibson to US 74 near Hamlet. Around 1938, it was rerouted from Grace Chapel Road to US 74. In 1940, it was renumbered as NC 381, which was synched with SC 381 in South Carolina.

== Major intersections ==
The entire route is in Lee County.

Location	mi	km	Destinations	Notes
Tramway	0.0	0.0	US 1 / US 15 / US 501 (Jefferson Davis Highway) / Center Church Road	
Sanford	4.6	7.4	US 421 Bus. / NC 42 / NC 87 (Horner Boulevard / Main Street)	
1.000 mi = 1.609 km; 1.000 km = 0.621 mi
