= North Carolina Highway 381 =

State highway in North Carolina, US

North Carolina Highway 381

Route information
- Maintained by NCDOT
- Length: 10.6 mi (17.1 km)
- Existed: 1940–present

Major junctions
- South end: SC 381 at the South Carolina state line in Gibson
- I-74 / US 74 near Hamlet
- North end: US 74 Bus. near Hamlet

Location
- Country: United States
- State: North Carolina
- Counties: Scotland, Richmond

Highway system
- North Carolina Highway System; Interstate; US; State; Scenic
← NC 345	→ NC 400

North Carolina Highway 381 (NC 381) is a primary state highway in the U.S. state of North Carolina. The highway connects the cities of Hamlet and Gibson.

== Route description ==
NC 381 is a two-lane rural highway that traverses 10.6 miles (17.1 km) from the South Carolina state line in Gibson to U.S. Route 74 Business near Hamlet. The highway is flanked with farms and has little traffic.

== History ==
Established in 1940 as a renumbering of NC 78 when the route was extended to the South Carolina state line, connecting with SC 381; remained unchanged since inception.

== Junction list ==
County	Location	mi	km	Destinations	Notes
Scotland	Gibson	0.0	0.0	SC 381 south – McColl	South Carolina state line
Scotland	Gibson	0.4	0.64	NC 79 south (Main Street) – Bennettsville	South end of NC 79 overlap
Scotland	Gibson	1.2	1.9	NC 79 north (Main Street) / X Way Road – Laurinburg	North end of NC 79 overlap
Richmond		9.6	15.4	I-74 / US 74 – Laurinburg, Rockingham	Exit 320 (US 74)
Richmond		10.6	17.1	US 74 Bus. / Old Laurinburg Road – Laurinburg, Hamlet	
1.000 mi = 1.609 km; 1.000 km = 0.621 mi: Concurrency terminus
