= North Carolina Highway 79 =

State highway in Scotland County, North Carolina, US

North Carolina Highway 79
- Gibson Road
- NC 79 highlighted in red

Route information
- Maintained by NCDOT
- Length: 8.7 mi (14.0 km)
- Existed: 1935–present

Major junctions
- South end: SC 79 at the South Carolina state line in Gibson
- US 74 near Laurinburg
- North end: US 15 / US 401 / US 501 / US 74 Bus. in Laurinburg

Location
- Country: United States
- State: North Carolina
- Counties: Scotland

Highway system
- North Carolina Highway System; Interstate; US; State; Scenic
← NC 78	→ NC 80

North Carolina Highway 79 (NC 79) is an 8.7-mile-long (14.0 km) primary state highway in the U.S. state of North Carolina. NC 79 runs from the South Carolina border as a continuation of South Carolina Highway 79 (SC 79) at Gibson to U.S. Route 15 (US 15), US 401, US 501, and US 74 Business in Laurinburg. While signed north–south, NC 79 physically travels in an east–west direction between its termini. NC 79 is primarily a two-lane road running through rural Scotland County and residential areas west of Laurinburg. Combined with SC 79, the highways form a coherent route between SC 9 northwest of Bennettsville, South Carolina and Laurinburg.

A state highway between the South Carolina border west of Gibson and Laurinburg was first established in 1921 as North Carolina Highway 203. Originally, NC 203 traveled between South Carolina and NC 20 through Gibson. NC 203 was subsequently renumbered as NC 79 by 1935. Originally, NC 79 ran between South Carolina and US 74 (modern-day US 74 Business) west of Laurinburg. In 1966, NC 79 was extended east along US 74 to its modern-day northern terminus at US 15, US 401, US 501, and US 74 Business.

== Route description ==
The southern terminus of NC 79 is at the North Carolina–South Carolina state line west of Gibson. From the state line, NC 79 runs northeast along Main Street toward central Gibson. At Francis Street, NC 79 makes a slight turn to the east, an orientation which it follows through Gibson. NC 79 meets NC 381 at Church Street. The intersection is the beginning of a concurrency between NC 79 and NC 381 that continues through Gibson. NC 79 and NC 381 crosses a railroad line operated by CSX Transportation at an at-grade crossing, 450 feet (140 m) to the east of Church Street. Continuing east along Main Street, NC 79 and NC 381 largely pass through a residential area of Gibson. In eastern Gibson, the NC 79 and NC 381 concurrency ends at an intersection with Hamlet Road. NC 381 continues to the northwest toward Hamlet, while NC 79 continues east toward Laurinburg. NC 79 continues along Main Street until leaving the Gibson city limits, where it is renamed Gibson Road.

East of Gibson, NC 79 continues through a rural area of Scotland County, with sparse residential areas, farms, and forested areas adjacent to the highway. In addition, several residential communities are located near the state highway. NC 79 crosses Joes Creek, which drains to the Little Pee Dee River, before making a slight turn to the northeast. The highway crosses Lower Beaverdam Creek and makes another northeasterly turn. As NC 79 approaches Rockingham Road, it begins a turn to the east, which is completed immediately east of Springs Mill Road. Approaching Laurinburg, NC 79 makes a slight southeasterly turn, an orientation the highway follows for the remainder of its route. NC 79 meets US 74 at an incomplete interchange west of Laurinburg. The highway continues for 0.5 miles (0.80 km) to the east along Gibson Road until meeting US 74 Business at an at-grade intersection. At the intersection, NC 79 turns to overlap US 74 Business as they continue east. The highways continue for 0.7 miles (1.1 km) through a residential area of western Laurinburg until NC 79 reaches its northern terminus at US 15, US 401, and US 501. US 74 Business continues east along Church Street towards downtown Laurinburg.

The North Carolina Department of Transportation (NCDOT) measures average daily traffic volumes along many of the roadways it maintains. In 2016, average daily traffic volumes along NC 79 varied from 1,900 vehicles per day between the South Carolina line and NC 381 to 8,100 vehicles per day at Forest Road in Laurinburg. No section of NC 79 is included in the National Highway System, a network of highways in the United States which serve strategic transportation facilities. However, the highway does connect to the National Highway System at US 74 southwest of Laurinburg and at US 15, US 401, US 501 in Laurinburg.

== History ==
In 1916 and 1918, North Carolina prepared a planned system of state highways consistent with the Federal Aid Road Act of 1916. The routing of NC 79 did not appear on either plan. By 1920, an improved road existed linking South Carolina to Laurinburg via. Gibson and Springfield. Upon the creation of the North Carolina State Highway System in 1921, much of the modern-day routing was signed as portions of NC 20 and NC 203.

North Carolina Highway 203
- Location: SC State Line–Laurinburg
- Length: 8 mi (13 km)
- Existed: 1921–1935

NC 203 was an original state highway that traversed from the South Carolina state line, at Gibson, to NC 20 west of Laurinburg. In 1921, the northern terminus of NC 203 was located at the modern-day intersection with Springs Mill Road south of Laurel Hill. By 1926, NC 20 was realigned to follow a direct route between Laurinburg and Laurel Hill, while NC 203 was extended east to NC 20 west of Laurinburg. NC 203 was adjusted to run further east by 1929, ending at US 74 and NC 20 two miles (3.2 km) west of Laurinburg. By 1935, NC 203 was renumbered as NC 79.

NC 79 first appeared on North Carolina state transportation maps in 1935, running from the South Carolina state line near Gibson to US 74 (modern-day US 74 Business) in Laurinburg. At the time of establishment, NC 79 was a paved highway. The routing of NC 79 remained consistent until January 7, 1966. In 1966, the northern terminus of NC 79 was extended 0.6 miles (0.97 km) from US 74 to a newly completed US 15/US 401 freeway in Laurinburg. The extension was concurrent with US 74 for its entire length. US 74 was routed onto a new freeway south of Laurinburg in November 1984. The former route, including the NC 79 concurrency became US 74 Business.

== Major intersections ==
The entire route is in Scotland County.

Location	mi	km	Destinations	Notes
Gibson	0.0	0.0	SC 79 south – Bennettsville	South Carolina state line; southern terminus
Gibson	0.3	0.48	NC 381 south (Church Street) – McColl	Southern end of NC 381 concurrency
Gibson	1.1	1.8	NC 381 north / X Way Road – Hamlet	Northern end of NC 381 concurrency
	7.5	12.1	US 74 east – Lumberton	Exit 182 (US 74); eastbound entrance / westbound exit only; future I-74
	8.0	12.9	US 74 Bus. west (Andrew Jackson Highway) – Hamlet	Western end of US 74 Bus. concurrency
Laurinburg	8.7	14.0	US 15 / US 401 / US 501 / US 74 Bus. east (Church Street) – McColl, Fayetteville, Aberdeen	Northern terminus; diamond interchange; eastern end of US 74 Bus. concurrency
1.000 mi = 1.609 km; 1.000 km = 0.621 mi: Concurrency terminus; Incomplete access

== See also ==
- U.S. Bicycle Route 1-Concurrent with NC 79 in Springfield
