= North Carolina Highway 344 =

State highway in Pasquotank County, North Carolina, US

North Carolina Highway 344

Route information
- Maintained by NCDOT
- Length: 20.9 mi (33.6 km)
- Existed: 2006–present

Major junctions
- South end: Weeks Drive in Glen Cove
- US 17 Bus. in Elizabeth City; US 17 in Elizabeth City
- North end: US 17 Byp. in Elizabeth City

Location
- Country: United States
- State: North Carolina
- Counties: Pasquotank

Highway system
- North Carolina Highway System; Interstate; US; State; Scenic
← NC 343	→ NC 345

North Carolina Highway 344 (NC 344) is a primary state highway in the U.S. state of North Carolina. It serves to connect Elizabeth City with communities in southern Pasquotank County.

== Route description ==
The highway's southern terminus lies at the shores of the Pasquotank River near its mouth with the Albemarle Sound. NC 344 winds northwestward through rural Pasquotank County and the unincorporated community of Weeksville as the two-lane Salem Church and Weeksville Roads, becoming a four-lane with center turning lane thoroughfare at the main gate of Coast Guard Air Station Elizabeth City southeast of Elizabeth City.

NC 344 continues along for another 1.41 miles (2.27 km) before entering the city limits of Elizabeth City at the southeastern corner of the Elizabeth City State University campus. Continuing to the southwestern corner of the Elizabeth City State University campus at its intersection with Herrington Road, NC 344 drops its designation of Weeksville Road, becoming Halstead Boulevard for the duration of its existence.

NC 344 continues on for another 5.2 miles (8.4 km) as a major commercial corridor along Elizabeth City's southern border, having major intersections at Ehringhaus Street or U.S. Route 17 Business (US 17 Bus.) and the mainline US 17 (Hughes Boulevard). Continuing past mainline US 17 as the limited-access thoroughfare Halstead Boulevard Extension, NC 344 travels through the heart of an emerging retail corridor in western Elizabeth City before coming to a diamond interchange at US 17 Bypass. The interchange marks the northern terminus of NC 344.

== History ==
Weeksville and Herrington Roads, Road and Water Streets through Elizabeth City, carried the designation of NC 170 from the 1950s, followed by NC 168 from 1958 to 1979, then most recently NC 34 before its conversion to NC 344 in 2006.

All three highways continued their route east of Elizabeth City, running concurrent with US 158 through Camden county until Belcross, with NC 170 and NC 168 continuing past Sligo to the Virginia border. The creation of NC 34 in 1979 ran from the Pasquotank River to Sligo, with NC 168 running from the Virginia border to Barco in Currituck County.

The previously unsigned Halstead Boulevard had become a major commercial corridor along the south side of Elizabeth City starting in the early 1990s. In 2006, NC 34 was truncated to the eastern third of its route from Belcross in Camden County to Sligo in Currituck County, leaving NC 344 to sign Weeksville Road and Halstead Boulevard to its new terminus with US 17 Bypass.

=== North Carolina Highway 170 ===
North Carolina Highway 170
- Location: Weeksville, NC–VA State Line
- Length: 35.2 mi (56.6 km)
- Existed: 1935–1958

North Carolina Highway 170 (NC 170) was established in 1935 as a new primary routing, from US 17, in Elizabeth City, south to Weeksville. In 1940, NC 170 was extended northeast, in concurrency with NC 30, to Belcross, then replaced NC 30 to Sligo and replaced NC 34 to the Virginia state line. In 1958, NC 170 was renumbered to NC 168 to its entire route.

NC 170 existed once before, from 1929 to 1934; established as a renumbering of NC 512, it traversed from US 15/NC 75, near Norman, to US 311/NC 70, in Candor. In 1932, US 411 was added to the entirety of the route. In 1934, both US 411/NC 170 was replaced by US 220.

== Junction list ==
The entire route is in Pasquotank County.

Location	mi	km	Destinations	Notes
Glen Cove	0.0	0.0	Dead end at Pasquotank River	Southern terminus
Elizabeth City	17.4	28.0	US 17 Bus. (Ehringhaus Street)	
Elizabeth City	17.5	28.2	US 17 (Hughes Boulevard) – Chesapeake, Hertford	
Elizabeth City	20.7– 20.9	33.3– 33.6	US 17 Byp. – Chesapeake, Hertford	Northern terminus; Interchange; Exit 258 (US 17 Bypass)
1.000 mi = 1.609 km; 1.000 km = 0.621 mi
