= North Carolina Highway 93 =

State highway in Alleghany County, North Carolina, US

North Carolina Highway 93

Route information
- Maintained by NCDOT
- Length: 9.9 mi (15.9 km)
- Existed: 1940–present

Major junctions
- West end: SR 93 at the Virginia state line in Piney Creek
- NC 113 in Piney Creek
- East end: US 221 in Twin Oaks

Location
- Country: United States
- State: North Carolina
- Counties: Alleghany

Highway system
- North Carolina Highway System; Interstate; US; State; Scenic
← NC 92	→ NC 94

North Carolina Highway 93 (NC 93) is a primary state highway in the U.S. state of North Carolina. It runs from the Virginia state line to the community of Twin Oaks, entirely in Alleghany County.

== Route description ==
NC 93 begins at the Virginia state line and goes southeast for 10 miles (16 km) on a curvy road that ends at US 221 just outside of Twin Oaks. It is overlapped with NC Bike Route 4 along the entire length of the route.

== History ==
Originally established as North Carolina Highway 260 in 1935, it was renumbered in 1940 to match the older Virginia State Route 93. In 1977, NC 93 was rerouted in Piney Creek to its current routing; abandoning Pugh Road and extending NC 113 further north to its current northern terminus.

NC 93 existed two times before it current routing:

1. In 1929, it was established as a new road from Pittsboro to Graham; then in 1933 it was extended further to US 70/NC 10. In 1940, it was renumbered as NC 87, with its 1933 extension forming part of NC 54.
2. In 1940, NC 93 was established briefly as a connector between Tramway to Jonesboro (community later absorbed by Sanford). It was renumbered to NC 78 in late 1940 when NCDOT decided it was more important to match Virginia instead.

== Major intersections ==
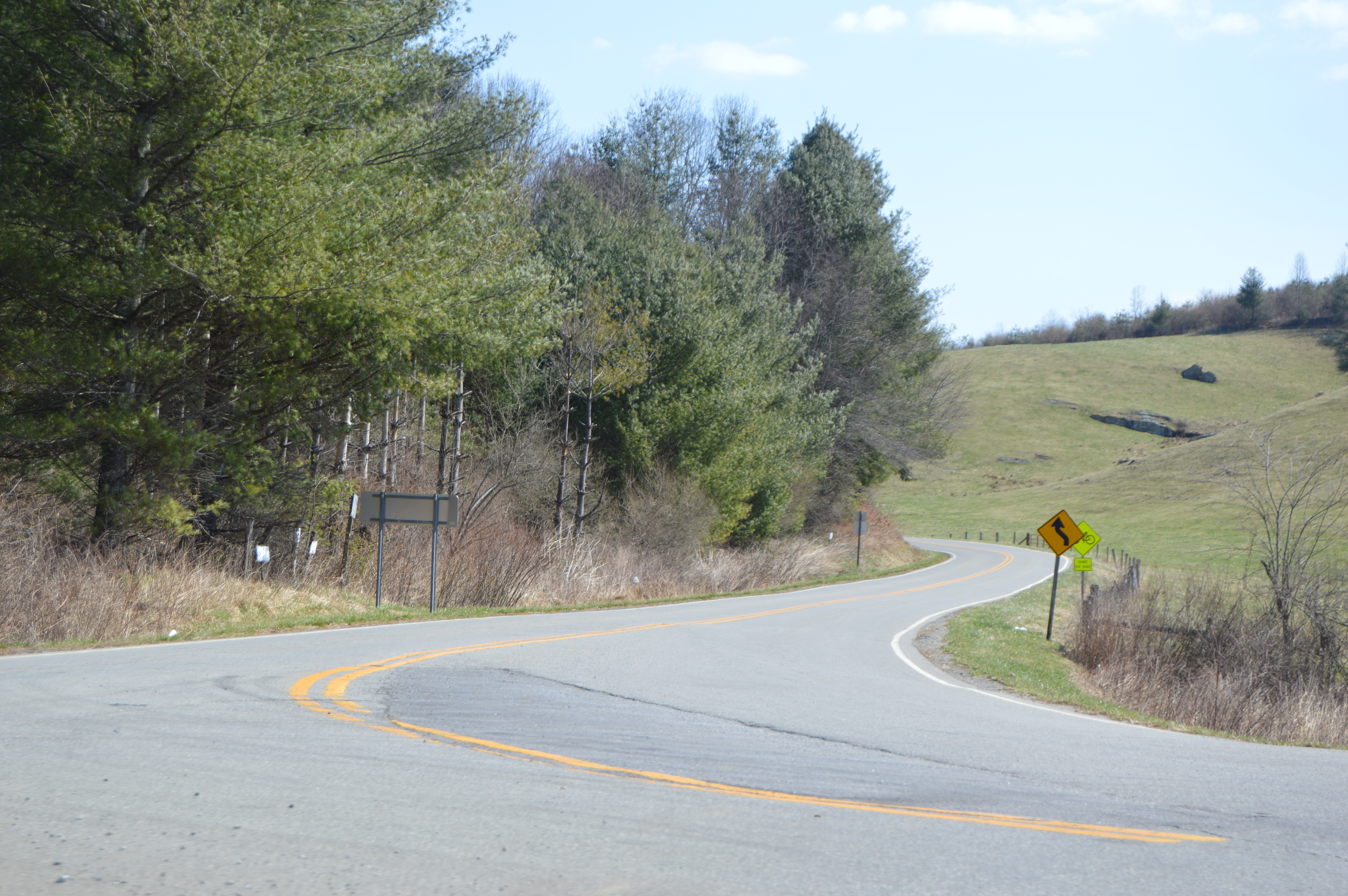
NC 93 from the NC 113 junction

The entire route is in Alleghany County.

Location	mi	km	Destinations	Notes
Piney Creek	0.0	0.0	SR 93 north – Mouth of Wilson	Western terminus; Virginia state line
Piney Creek	0.5	0.80	NC 113 south – Laurel Springs	Northern terminus of NC 113
Twin Oaks	9.9	15.9	US 221 – Sparta, Jefferson	Eastern terminus
1.000 mi = 1.609 km; 1.000 km = 0.621 mi
