= North Carolina Highway 136 =

State highway in Currituck County, North Carolina, US

North Carolina Highway 136

Route information
- Maintained by NCDOT
- Length: 2.22 mi (3.57 km)
- Existed: 2004–present

Major junctions
- West end: US 158 near Grandy
- East end: At a boat launch and parking lot in Poplar Branch

Location
- Country: United States
- State: North Carolina
- Counties: Currituck

Highway system
- North Carolina Highway System; Interstate; US; State; Scenic
← NC 135	→ NC 137

North Carolina Highway 136 (NC 136) is a 2.22-mile (3.57 km) North Carolina state highway that runs entirely within Currituck County. It is a short spur of U.S. Route 158 (US 158), connecting the U.S. Highway to the small unincorporated community of Poplar Branch. The route's eastern terminus is at a boat launch on the Currituck Sound. Prior to 2002, NC 136's current alignment was known as NC 3. In 2002, the numbering of this road and of what was then NC 136 which was located in Iredell and Cabarrus counties swapped to place NC 3 near the home of Dale Earnhardt, a deceased NASCAR driver from Kannapolis who drove the #3 car.

== Route description ==
NC 136 begins at an intersection with US 158, heading east on two-lane undivided Macedonia Church Road. The road heads through wooded areas with some farm fields and homes. The highway turns north onto Poplar Branch Road and heads through the residential community of Poplar Branch, curving to the northeast. NC 136 runs through more woodland with some homes before coming to a dead end at a boat launch on the Currituck Sound.

== History ==
In 1934, NC 3 was signed as a short 1.5-mile (2.4 km) route on Buck Island traveling from U.S. Highway 158 to the Currituck Sound in Currituck County.

In 2002, state legislation was passed to swap NC 3 and NC 136. The process started in December of that year with the designation change in Iredell County, followed by Cabarrus County in February 2003. In February, 2004, the swap was completed with the establishment of NC 136 in Currituck County. This was done in order for the other road to honor Dale Earnhardt, a NASCAR driver from Kannapolis that drove the #3 car who was killed in the 2001 Daytona 500.

== Junction list ==
The entire route is in Poplar Branch, Currituck County.

mi	km	Destinations	Notes
0.00	0.00	US 158 (Caratoke Highway) – Nags Head, Elizabeth City	
2.22	3.57	Dead end	
1.000 mi = 1.609 km; 1.000 km = 0.621 mi
