= North Carolina Highway 400 =

State highway in Dare County, North Carolina, US

North Carolina Highway 400

Route information
- Maintained by NCDOT
- Length: 0.63 mi (1,010 m)
- Existed: 1985–present

Major junctions
- West end: US 64 in Manteo
- East end: Roanoke Island Festival Park in Manteo

Location
- Country: United States
- State: North Carolina
- Counties: Dare

Highway system
- North Carolina Highway System; Interstate; US; State; Scenic
← NC 381	→ US 401

North Carolina Highway 400 (NC 400) is the shortest primary state highway in the U.S. state of North Carolina. It is 0.63 miles (1.01 km) long and is entirely in Dare County and the town of Manteo on Roanoke Island. The route traverses from its western terminus at US 64 to the Elizabeth II vessel (State Historic Site) docked on Ice Plant Island, located in Shallowbag Bay. Unlike other state routes, all of the NC 400 markers have brown recreational backgrounds. The route is split among two one-way streets: eastbound and westbound.

== Route description ==
NC 400 begins at an intersection with US 64 in the town of Manteo. The route begins as a pair of one-way street, with NC 400 heading eastbound along Fernando Street and westbound along Ananias Dare Street. The eastbound direction heads through a residential portion of Manteo, running along Fernando Street, turning northward at an intersection with Queen Elizabeth Street, where it heads to Ananias Dare Street, meeting with the westbound alignment of NC 400. There, the now two-way street heads eastward as Festival Park, crossing Dough's Creek and entering the Roanoke Waterfront, where the Elizabeth II, a ship declared historic by the state of North Carolina, is docked. This also serves as the eastern terminus of NC 400.

== Major intersections ==
The entire route is in Manteo, Dare County.

mi	km	Destinations	Notes
0.00	0.00	US 64	Western terminus; WB lane continues as Ananias Dare Street; Fernando Street feeds into EB lane
0.63	1.01	Roanoke Island Festival Park	Eastern terminus; road continues into the park
1.000 mi = 1.609 km; 1.000 km = 0.621 mi
