= North Carolina Highway 175 =

State highway in Clay County, North Carolina, US

North Carolina Highway 175

Route information
- Maintained by NCDOT
- Length: 4.139 mi (6.661 km)
- Existed: 1967–present

Major junctions
- South end: SR 75 at the Georgia state line near Hiawassee, GA
- North end: US 64 near Elf

Location
- Country: United States
- State: North Carolina
- Counties: Clay

Highway system
- North Carolina Highway System; Interstate; US; State; Scenic
← NC 172	→ US 176

North Carolina Highway 175 (NC 175) is a primary state highway in the U.S. state of North Carolina. The highway runs north from the Georgia state line to US 64, along the eastern banks of Chatuge Lake.

== Route description ==
NC 175 begins at the Georgia state line just north of Hiawassee, Georgia. This is at the northern terminus of Georgia SR 75. NC 175 heads north, running just east of Chatuge Lake and is located in the Nantahala National Forest. At just over 4 miles (6.4 km), NC 175 comes to its northern end at US 64 near the community of Elf, east of Hayesville.

== History ==
The first NC 175 was an original state highway, traversing from NC 194, in Newland, to NC 17, in Blowing Rock. In 1930, NC 175 was replaced by NC 181, between Newland and Linville, and US 221/NC 691, between Linville and Blowing Rock.

The second and current NC 175 was a renumbering of NC 135, which was previously established 29 days earlier along secondary road 1154. The routing has remained unchanged since its establishment.

The Fred L. Woodard Sr. Bridge carries the highway over the Shooting Creek arm of the lake, near the northeast end. The original was a one-lane bridge built from 1941 to 1942, which was wide for a single lane but yet nearly impossible for opposing traffic to pass each other. The current bridge began construction in August 2014 just to the east of the original, destroying the business which had stood on the southeast corner of 175 and old 64 for decades. It opened in September 2015, and at the request of NCDOT, the TVA subsequently lowered the lake level in October to make it shallow enough to complete demolition of the old bridge starting in November. At the north end, northbound motorists must turn left to stay on NC 175, or right to go on NC 1353, both of which were the original route of U.S. 64 until the 1960s.

== Future ==
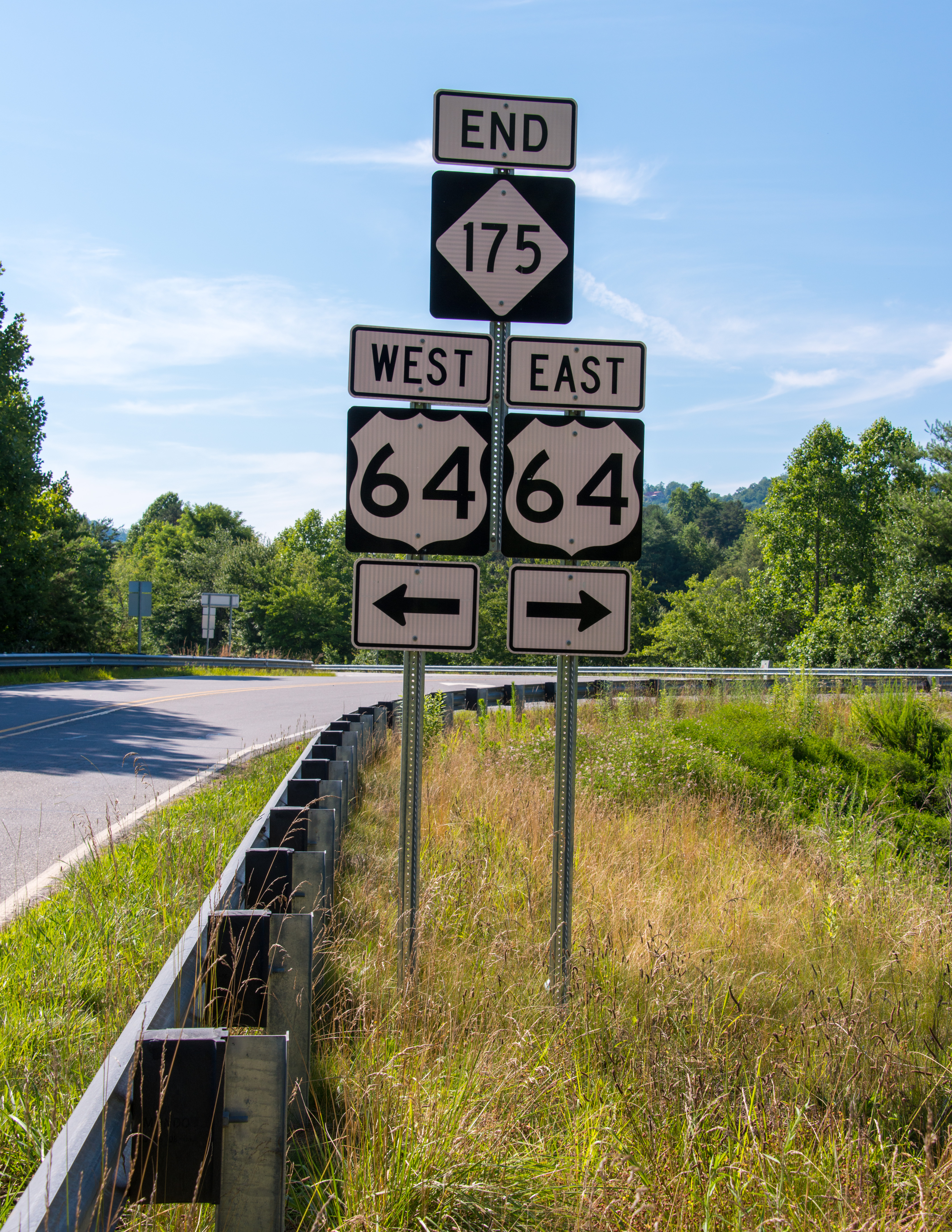
North end of NC 175, at U.S. 64

NCDOT plans to widen all of NC 175, from the Georgia state line to US 64. The project includes widening lanes to 11 feet (3.4 m), from the current 10 feet (3.0 m), and add bike lanes or just paved shoulders of 5 feet (1.5 m), plus a further unpaved shoulder of 3 feet (0.9 m) on both sides, nearly doubling the size of the road but not adding any capacity. At an estimated cost of $4.8 million, it is currently unfunded. Environmental assessments are expected to be done in February 2017, with taking of property from homeowners along the route starting in July 2018, and construction beginning in January 2020.

== Junction list ==
The entire route is in Clay County.

Location	mi	km	Destinations	Notes
	0.00	0.00	SR 75 south – Hiawassee	Georgia state line
	3.26	5.25	Old Highway 64	
Elf	4.14	6.66	US 64 – Hayesville, Franklin	
1.000 mi = 1.609 km; 1.000 km = 0.621 mi

== See also ==
- North Carolina Highway 69, which runs along the opposite side of Chatuge Lake
