= North Carolina Highway 13 =

North Carolina Highway 13 may refer to:

- North Carolina Highway 13 (1921–1930), First incarnation NC 13 running between Durham and Roxboro.
- North Carolina Highway 13 (1934–1935), Short lived second incarnation running between Raleigh and Creedmoor.
- North Carolina Highway 13 (1935–1951), Third incarnation of NC 13 running from US 220 near Seagrove to US 421 near Staley.

== See also ==
- U.S. Route 13 in North Carolina, current day "highway 13" in North Carolina
