= North Carolina Highway 345 =

State highway in Dare County, North Carolina, US

North Carolina Highway 345

Route information
- Maintained by NCDOT
- Length: 4.8 mi (7.7 km)
- Existed: 1921–present

Major junctions
- South end: Thicket Lump Drive in Wanchese
- North end: US 64 / US 64 Byp. in Manteo

Location
- Country: United States
- State: North Carolina
- Counties: Dare

Highway system
- North Carolina Highway System; Interstate; US; State; Scenic
| ← NC 344 | → NC 381 |

North Carolina Highway 345 (NC 345) is a primary state highway in the U.S. state of North Carolina connecting Wanchese and Manteo on Roanoke Island. The highway begins at The Lane and Thicket Lump Drive south of the town marina. Following Mill Landing Road through Wanchese, the road eventually becomes the western boundary for the Roanoke Island Marshes Dedicated Nature Preserve, before reaching its northern terminus at US 64.

== Route description ==
NC 345 is a two-lane road that begins at the intersection of Thicket Lump Drive/The Lane in southeastern Wanchese. At first the highway runs northeast along Mill Landing Road, paralleling the curve in the Roanoke Sound. As the road approaches the town marina it turns directly toward a north/northwestern direction providing access to several docks along the western side of the marina. Passing by the marina, NC 345 turns west heading into a residential zone of the town. After passing Old Schoolhouse Road, NC 345 runs by the post office in Wanchese along with several other small businesses including a radio station. As the road nears Old Warf Road, it widens to include turn lanes, for the intersection on the edge of town. After the intersection, NC 345 turns slightly more northerly and leaves Wanchese.

NC 345 runs through very marshy terrain north of town, with many small streams and lakes near the road. Several houses are built off of the side of the rural road, however the land remains fairly undeveloped. The highway becomes the western boundary for the Roanoke Island Marshes Dedicated Nature Preserve leading to why the area is so desolate. As the road nears its northern terminus, the land becomes more forested, and several houses and small businesses are built alongside of the road. Several other small neighborhoods are found off of the western side of the road. The highway makes several U-Shaped turns before passing by a water plant, and reaching its northern terminus at US 64.

== History ==
NC 345 was an original state highway, which traversed from Wanchese to Manteo and possibly to the Fort Raleigh National Historic Site (confirmed by 1924).

Around 1950, US 64/US 264 was routed onto Roanoke Island (ferry from Manns Harbor and bridge to Nags Head) with both sharing concurrency with NC 345 through Manteo. In 1965, NC 345 was reduced by .33 miles (0.53 km) at the Fort Raleigh National Historic Site. In 1967, US 64/US 264 replaced NC 345 through Manteo, pushing its northern terminus to its current location. Also same year, NC 345 was rerouted in Wanchese, from going west to the Croatan Sound to east along the Mill Landing Creek area (originally NC 345A), ending at Thicket Lump Drive (SR 1141); its old alignment became Old Wharf Road (SR 1168).

== Junction list ==
The entire route is in Dare County.

| Location | mi | km | Destinations | Notes |
|---|---|---|---|---|
| Wanchese | 0.0 | 0.0 | Thicket Lump Drive | |
| Manteo | 4.8 | 7.7 | US 64 / US 64 Byp. – Nags Head, Columbia, Manteo | |
1.000 mi = 1.609 km; 1.000 km = 0.621 mi

== Special routes ==
=== Wanchese alternate spur ===
North Carolina Highway 345A
- Location: Wanchese, North Carolina
- Length: 1.67 mi (2.69 km)
- Existed: 1929–1962

North Carolina Highway 345A (NC 345A) was established in 1929 as an alternate spur from NC 345 to the Mill Landing Creek area. Sometime between 1958 and 1962, the route was decommissioned, becoming Mill Landing Road (SR 1141). In 1963, this former route became part of mainline NC 345.

=== Manteo east spur ===
North Carolina Highway 345E
- Location: Manteo, North Carolina
- Length: 0.40 mi (640 m)
- Existed: 1936–1962

North Carolina Highway 345E (NC 345E) was established between 1931 and 1936 as an eastern spur from NC 345 into downtown Manteo. It is unknown if the route was actually signed during its time, but it appeared in Dare County Maps up through 1957. Sometime between 1958 and 1962, the route was decommissioned, becoming Highway Street and later Budleigh Street (SR 1150).
