= North Carolina Highway 137 =

State highway in Gates County, North Carolina, US

North Carolina Highway 137

Route information
- Maintained by NCDOT
- Length: 8.6 mi (13.8 km)
- Existed: 1973–present

Major junctions
- West end: US 13 / US 158 near Winton
- East end: NC 37 in Gatesville

Location
- Country: United States
- State: North Carolina
- Counties: Gates

Highway system
- North Carolina Highway System; Interstate; US; State; Scenic
| ← NC 136 | → NC 138 |

North Carolina Highway 137 (NC 137) is a 8.6-mile-long (13.8 km) highway entirely in Gates County, North Carolina. NC 137 runs from NC 37 in Gatesville to US Highway 13/US Highway 158 (US 13/US 158) north of Winton.

== Route description ==
NC 137 starts at US 13/US 158 north of Winton, North Carolina. NC 137 heads southeast towards Eure, North Carolina. After passing through Eure. NC 137 passes over Jady Branch. NC 137 enters Gatesville on Court Street and reaches the east end of its route at NC 37 in downtown Gatesville.

The entire route is concurrent with North Carolina Bicycle Route 4 (North Trace Line).

== History ==
NC 137 was created in 1973 as an upgrade of SR 1112. The original routing was the same as the current.

== Junction list ==
The entire route is in Gates County.

| Location | mi | km | Destinations | Notes |
|---|---|---|---|---|
| | 0.0 | 0.0 | US 13 / US 158 / Sandbank Road – Winton, Suffolk | |
| Gatesville | 8.6 | 13.8 | NC 37 (Main Street) | |
1.000 mi = 1.609 km; 1.000 km = 0.621 mi
