= North Carolina Highway 70 =

Former state highway in North Carolina, United States

North Carolina Highway 70

Route information
- Maintained by NCDOT
- Length: 196 mi (315 km) Circa 1933
- Existed: 1921–1934

Major junctions
- South end: SC 9 at North Carolina-South Carolina State Line near Lake View, South Carolina
- North end: US 29 North Carolina-Virginia state line near Danville, Virginia

Location
- Country: United States
- State: North Carolina

Highway system
- North Carolina Highway System; Interstate; US; State; Scenic

North Carolina Highway 70 (NC 70) was one of the original state highways in the U.S. state of North Carolina running from the South Carolina state line to the Virginia state line north of Greensboro. NC 70 connected Greensboro, Aberdeen, and Fayetteville.

== History ==
North Carolina Highway 70 was an original state highway established in 1921. In 1925, NC 70 was rerouted to Lumberton, then down south to the South Carolina state line following today's NC 41. The part from Lumberton to Rowland became NC 22. In 1926, NC 70 was placed onto the current US 220 Alternate near Seagrove. In 1927, U.S. Route 170 (US 170) got the routing from Greensboro to the Virginia state line. That part of the route later became US 29. In 1932, US 411 was given the routing from Greensboro to Randleman. In 1934, NC 70 ceased to exist. The part from Lumberton to the South Carolina state line became NC 41. The section of routing from Lumberton to Red Springs became NC 72. Routing from Red Springs to Aberdeen became NC 211. The route from Pinehurst to Candor became NC 2 and from Candor to Greensboro became US 220. US 29 replaced both US 170 and NC 70 from Greensboro to the Virginia state line.
