= North Carolina Highway 172 =

State highway in Onslow County, North Carolina, US

North Carolina Highway 172

- Current segments of NC 172 in solid red; former segment in dashed red

Route information
- Maintained by NCDOT
- Length: 25.2 mi (40.6 km)
- Existed: 1940s–present

Major junctions
- South end: US 17 near Holly Ridge
- NC 210 near Sneads Ferry
- North end: NC 24 in Starling

Location
- Country: United States
- State: North Carolina
- Counties: Onslow

Highway system
- North Carolina Highway System; Interstate; US; State; Scenic
← NC 171	→ NC 175

North Carolina Highway 172 (NC 172) is a primary state highway in the U.S. state of North Carolina; it is entirely in Onslow County. It is also unique in that it is in two segments because of Marine Corps Base Camp Lejeune.

== Route description ==
The entire routing of NC 172 is in Onslow County split in the middle by Camp Lejeune. The route's southern terminus is at US 17 in the unincorporated community of Folkstone, located between Holly Ridge and Wilmington. The road heads east-northeast through a mix of forest land and small houses towards the community of Sneads Ferry. About 4 miles (6.4 km) from its terminus, it intersects NC 210. It then starts to bend towards the north forming the border of the Sneads Ferry census-designated place. The Lakeside Drive/Old Ferry Road intersection is the last intersection that is accessible by the public along the southern segment of NC 172. North of there, the road crosses the New River before reaching the gate to Camp Lejeune. Through Camp Lejeune, the closed road heads east then north through mostly forested lands of the base. The road reopens at its intersection with Bear Creek Road, just north of a gate. On this segment of the road, NC 172 heads north passing forestland on the west side of the road and some houses on the east. The signed highway ends at a signalized intersection with NC 24 in Starling near Hubert.

== History ==
In April 2007, travel through the Camp Lejeune section of the highway was restricted to vehicles with U.S. Department of Defense decals as a security measure. On June 25, 2026, the North Carolina Department of Transportation (NCDOT) approved the 15.18-mile (24.43 km) section of NC 172 through Camp Lejuene as SR 3329, splitting the route into two sections.

== Junction list ==
The entire route is in Onslow County.

Location	mi	km	Destinations	Notes
Folkstone	0.0	0.0	US 17 – Jacksonville, Wilmington	
	4.0	6.4	NC 210 – Jacksonville, Surf City, North Topsail Beach	
	6.9– 22.1	11.1– 35.6	Marine Corps Base Camp Lejeune; Road closed to public	
Starling	25.2	40.6	NC 24 – Jacksonville, Swansboro	
1.000 mi = 1.609 km; 1.000 km = 0.621 mi
