= North Carolina Highway 13 (1936–1951) =

State highway in the U.S.

North Carolina Highway 13

Route information
- Maintained by NCDOT
- Length: 26 mi (42 km)
- Existed: 1936–1951

Major junctions
- South end: US 220 near Seagrove
- NC 902 near Coleridge; NC 22 near Coleridge; US 64 near Ramseur
- North end: US 421 in Staley

Location
- Country: United States
- State: North Carolina
- Counties: Randolph

Highway system
- North Carolina Highway System; Interstate; US; State; Scenic
← US 13	→ NC 14

North Carolina Highway 13 (NC 13) was a primary state highway in the U.S. state of North Carolina. The highway connected U.S. Route 220 (US 220) north of Seagrove with US 421 in Staley. The routing of the highway was fairly rural, with Staley the only notable town along the routing. The route was established in 1936 and decommissioned in 1951.

== Route description ==
NC 13 began at US 220 about three miles north of Seagrove. The highway ran northeast along present-day Old State Highway 13, passing just south of the North Carolina Zoo. Before reaching NC 902, the highway turned briefly to the north and crossed a tributary of the Deep River. NC 13 followed NC 902 to the east for approximately two miles before turning to the northeast along present-day Hinshaw Town Road. Turning to the east, the highway crossed the Deep River before intersecting NC 22, north of Coleridge. From there the highway followed present-day Parks Crossroads Church Road to the north. The highway passed through the unincorporated community of Parks Crossroads before continuing north to US 64. After crossing US 64, the highway continued to the north along present-day Browns Crossroads Road. NC 13 entered Staley from the south along Main Street and intersected US 421 (present-day Staley Street).

== History ==
NC 13 was established in 1936 (Note: In the 1936 and 1951 maps, NC 13 is located below Greensboro, in Seagrove.) as the third and final incarnation of NC 13. The 1936 state highway map shows the highway running from US 220 to NC 902, west of Coleridge. From there the highway followed along NC 902 for two miles before running northeast to Staley. The highway routing did not change from the original alignment. In 1936 a majority of the highway's road surface was either gravel or topsoil. However the segment between NC 22 and US 64 had an earth road surface. By 1951 the entire road surface was gravel/topsoil, however only the section concurrent with NC 902 was paved. NC 13 was decommissioned in 1951 due to the southern extension of US 13 into North Carolina.

== Junction list ==
The entire route was in Randolph County.

Location	mi	km	Destinations	Notes
Seagrove	0.0	0.0	US 220	
Coleridge	9.0	14.5	NC 902	Western end of NC 902 overlap
Coleridge	11.0	17.7	NC 902	Eastern end of NC 902 overlap
Coleridge	16.0	25.7	NC 22	
Ramseur	22.0	35.4	US 64	
Staley	26.0	41.8	US 421	
1.000 mi = 1.609 km; 1.000 km = 0.621 mi
