= North Carolina Highway 3 =

State highway in Cabarrus and Iredell counties in North Carolina, United States

North Carolina Highway 3

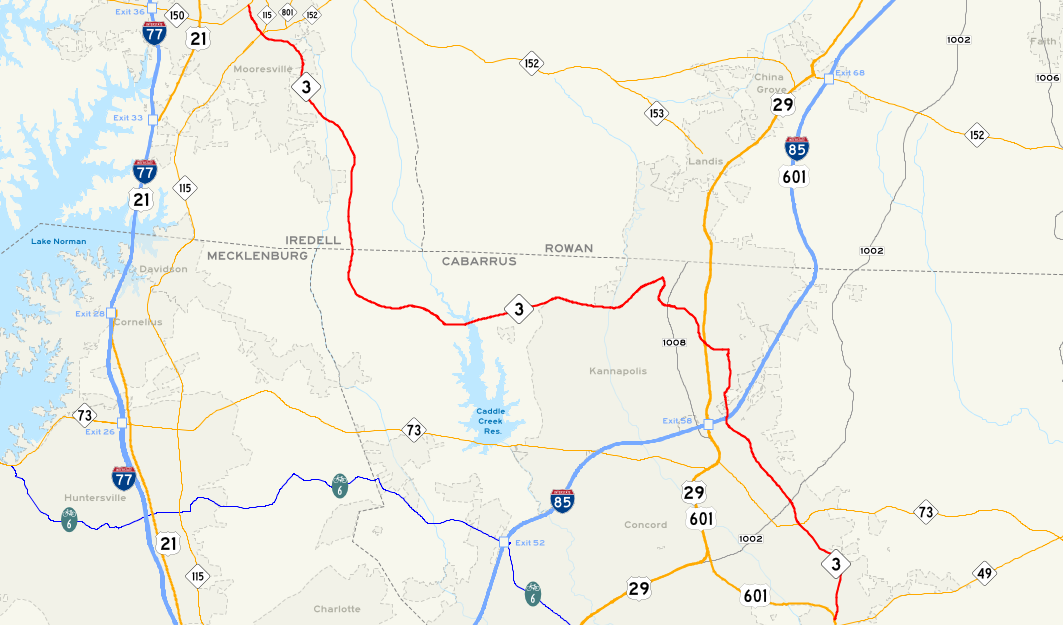

Route information
- Maintained by NCDOT
- Length: 27.8 mi (44.7 km)
- Existed: 2002–present

Major junctions
- South end: US 601 in Concord
- US 29 in Kannapolis
- North end: NC 150 in Mooresville

Location
- Country: United States
- State: North Carolina
- Counties: Cabarrus, Iredell

Highway system
- North Carolina Highway System; Interstate; US; State; Scenic
← NC 2	→ NC 4

North Carolina Highway 3 (NC 3) is a primary state highway in the U.S. state of North Carolina. The road runs from US 601 in southern Concord, north through Mooresville to US 29 in Kannapolis. Formerly designated North Carolina Highway 136 (NC 136), NC 3 is numbered after NASCAR driver Dale Earnhardt, who famously drove the #3 for most of his career. In 2002, the road was re-designated following Earnhardt's death at the 2001 Daytona 500. This state highway runs from Kannapolis, Earnhardt's birthplace, to downtown Mooresville, where many NASCAR teams are based. A short section of NC 3 is named Dale Earnhardt Boulevard, a name which was given to the road prior to Earnhardt's death.

== Route description ==
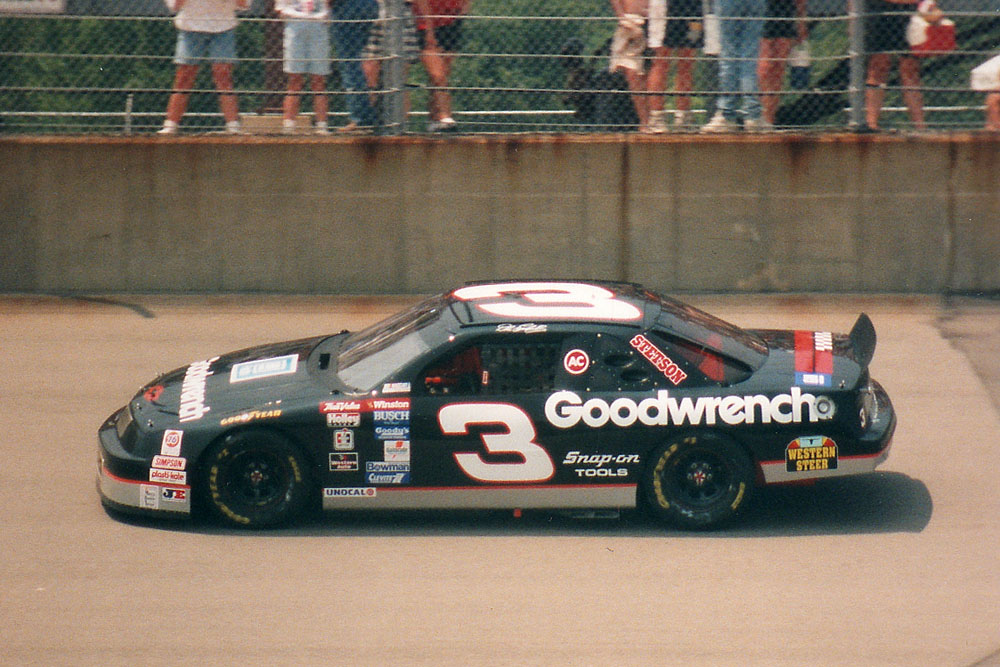
NC 3 is numbered in honor of Dale Earnhardt (pictured at the Michigan International Speedway in 1994)

NC 3's southern terminus is in Concord, at US 601, where it follows Union Street northwards from a fork in the road just north of where US 601 has an interchange with NC 49. The route continues on to Branchview Drive upon crossing Old Airport Road, bypassing downtown Concord to the east. The name changes again to Concord Lake Road upon crossing over I-85; there is no interchange with I-85, just an overpass. The road enters Kannapolis, where after approximately 1.5 miles (2.4 km), it comes to an intersection with Dale Earnhardt Boulevard. Turning left onto Dale Earnhardt Boulevard, it follows that road northeast, shortly reaching an oblique intersection with US 29. The road continues through the downtown area of Kannapolis, crossing Main Street and then NC 3 turns on to Mooresville Road, heading in a generally east-southeast direction.

Leaving Kannapolis near the Fisher Town neighborhood, the road crosses the northern tip of the Don T. Howell Reservoir, then curves to the north. At Earnhardt Lake Road, the name changes to Coddle Creek Highway. After crossing several miles of mostly rural area, it passes the headquarters of Dale Earnhardt, Inc. shortly before entering the corporate limits of Mooresville. Within Mooresville, it follows Iredell Avenue before reaching its northern terminus at NC 150.

== History ==
In 1934, NC 3 was signed as a short 1.5-mile (2.4 km) route on Buck Island traveling from US 158 to the Currituck Sound in Currituck County.

On October 23, 2002, Governor Mike Easley signed into law a bill officially reassigning NC 136 to NC 3's route and vice versa. NC 3 was moved because it was the hometown of the aforementioned Dale Earnhardt who died in the 2001 Daytona 500. Earnhardt drove the #3 Goodwrench Chevrolet and grew up in the Mooresville region. NC 136 now follows the old NC 3 route.

== Major intersections ==
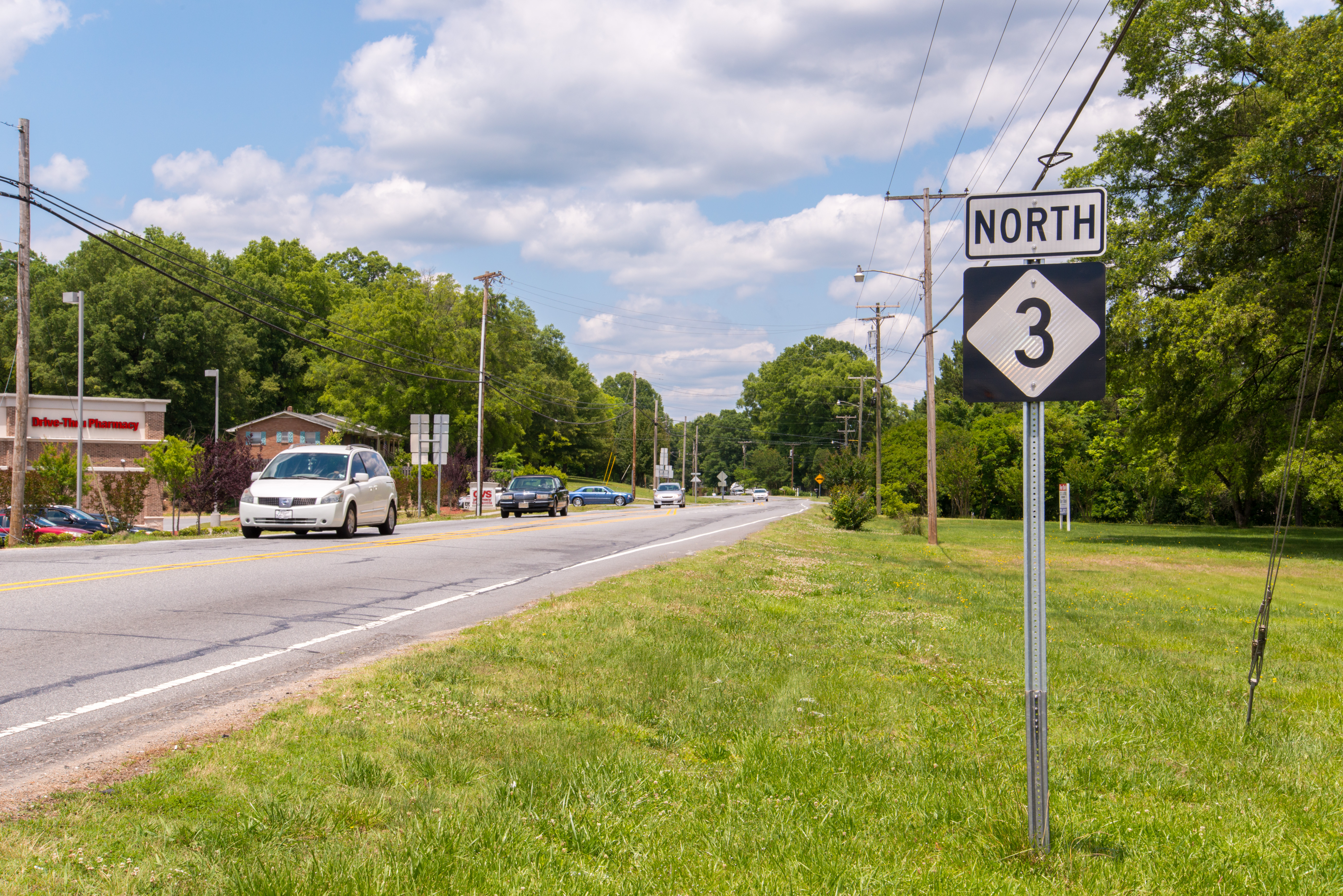
Northbound NC 3 in Concord

County	Location	mi	km	Destinations	Notes
Cabarrus	Concord	0.0	0.0	US 601 (Warren C. Coleman Boulevard) to NC 49 / Woodland Drive – Monroe, Kannapolis	
Cabarrus	Concord	2.9	4.7	NC 73 (Corban Avenue) – Mount Pleasant	
Cabarrus	Kannapolis	8.6	13.8	US 29 (Cannon Boulevard)	
Iredell	Mooresville	27.0	43.5	NC 152 east (North Main Street)	
Iredell	Mooresville	27.0	43.5	NC 115 (North Broad Street)	
Iredell	Mooresville	27.8	44.7	NC 150 (East Plaza Drive) to Limerick Road / I-77	
1.000 mi = 1.609 km; 1.000 km = 0.621 mi
