= North Carolina Highway 2 =

State highway in Moore County, North Carolina, US

North Carolina Highway 2

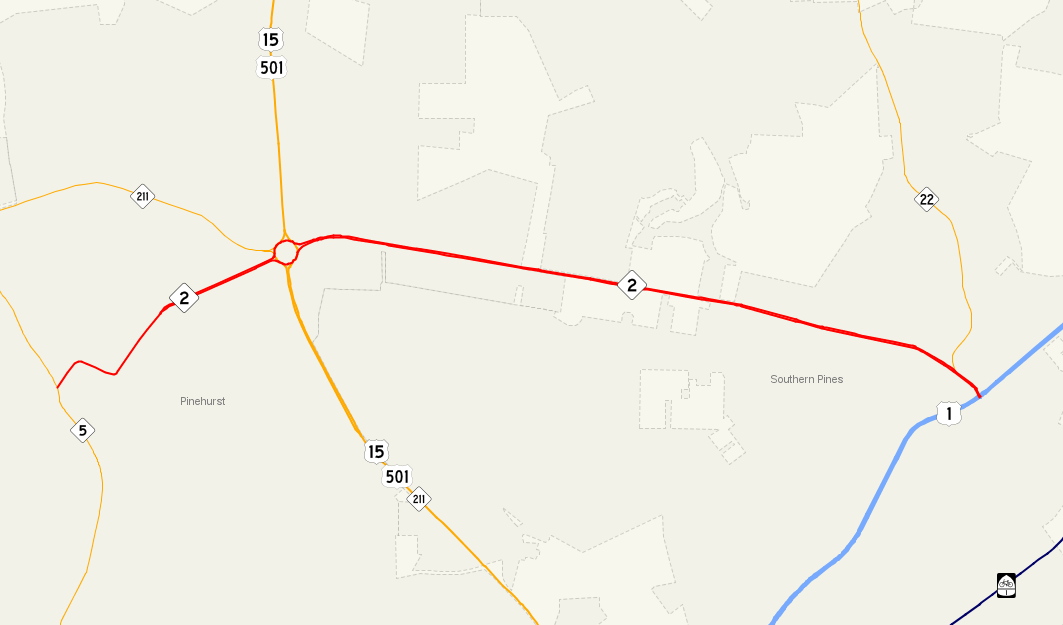

Route information
- Maintained by NCDOT
- Length: 5.49 mi (8.84 km)
- Existed: 1934–present

Major junctions
- West end: NC 5 in Pinehurst
- US 15 / US 501 / NC 211 in Pinehurst; NC 22 in Southern Pines
- East end: US 1 in Southern Pines

Location
- Country: United States
- State: North Carolina
- Counties: Moore

Highway system
- North Carolina Highway System; Interstate; US; State; Scenic
← US 1	→ NC 3

North Carolina Highway 2 (NC 2) is a primary state highway in the U.S. state of North Carolina. The highway runs between the towns of Pinehurst and Southern Pines connecting NC 5 with US 1. Much of the routing is known as Midland Road, a four lane road connecting the two towns.

NC 2 was commissioned between 1930 and 1935 as a new routing running from US 220 in Candor to US 1 in Southern Pines. The western end of the route was truncated at US 15/US 501 in 1940 with much of the former route to the west becoming NC 211. In 1952, NC 2 replaced its former bannered route, NC 2A along Yadkin Road to US 1 in Manly. The route was extended west to NC 211 (present day NC 5) along its former routing through Pinehurst, in 1957. NC 2 was truncated in 1967 to the US 1 Bypass that was built around Southern Pines.

== Route description ==
View west along NC 2 (Midland Road) west of its eastern terminus at US 1 in Southern Pines

NC 2 begins at an intersection with NC 5 (Beulah Hill Road), just south of downtown Pinehurst. The route follows Cherokee Road to the northeast through a residential section of the town before meeting a traffic circle. Continuing across the circle the road continues to follow Cherokee Street until meeting Azalea Road. At the intersection the street name changes to Azalea Road, and begins a turn toward the southeast. NC 2 turns northeast onto Palmetto Road near the Pinehurst Golf Course. It continues to follow Palmetto Road along the western side of the golf course. Palmetto Road turns slightly to the northeast before widening to a 4 lane road and becoming Midland Road. NC 2 meets up with US 15/US 501 and NC 211 at a traffic circle east of a shopping district. The road continues straight across the circle and continues on Midland Road. Midland Road crosses through a residential area west of Pinehurst before entering into the town of Southern Pines. NC 2 turns to the southeast before intersecting the southern terminus of NC 22 at Central Drive. The road then crosses McDeeds Creek before reaching its eastern terminus at an interchange with US 1.

== History ==
NC 2 was established sometime before 1935 running from US 220 in Candor east to US 1 in Southern Pines. The route ran southeast from Candor through the communities of Samarcand and Eagle Spurs to US 15 in West End. It then followed along a concurrency with US 15 to the southeast to US 15/US 501/NC 211 in Pinehurst. After briefly following concurrently along US 15/US 501 to the north, the road turned east until reaching its terminus at US 1 in downtown Southern Pines. In 1940, NC 2 was truncated to US 15/US 501 in Pinehurst, at the intersection of Midland Road and Page Road. The route to the west was resigned as NC 211. In 1952, NC 2A was decommissioned and NC 2 was routed along its former routing to US 1. The new routing brought NC 2 along Yadkin Road, further to the north of downtown Southern Pines. The former alignment into downtown became part of NC 22, however currently exists only as a secondary road. In 1957, NC 2 was extended west to NC 211 (present-day NC 5) in southern Pinehurst. The new routing followed along the roads previous routing which was decommissioned in 1940. Much of the routing is the same as in present day, however the formation of the golf courses adjacent of the road may have shifted some alignments. It was truncated in 1967 to the US 1 Bypass creating the current eastern terminus of the road.

== Major intersections ==
The entire route is in Moore County.

Location	mi	km	Destinations	Notes
Pinehurst	0.00	0.00	NC 5	Western terminus
Pinehurst	1.57	2.53	US 15 / US 501 / NC 211	Pinehurst Traffic Circle
Southern Pines	5.28	8.50	NC 22	Southern terminus of NC 22
Southern Pines	5.49	8.84	US 1	Eastern terminus
1.000 mi = 1.609 km; 1.000 km = 0.621 mi

== Former related route ==
North Carolina Highway 2A
- Location: Southern Pines
- Existed: 1945–1952

NC 2A was established in late 1941 running from NC 2 northeast of downtown Southern Pines, north of the town to US 1 in Manly. In 1952, NC 2A was decommissioned and NC 2 took over its routing to US 1.
