= South Carolina Highway 381 =

State highway in South Carolina, United States

South Carolina Highway 381

Route information
- Maintained by SCDOT
- Length: 22.700 mi (36.532 km)
- Existed: 1930–present

Major junctions
- South end: SC 38 in Blenheim
- US 15 / US 401 in McColl
- North end: NC 381 at the North Carolina state line near Gibson, NC

Location
- Country: United States
- State: South Carolina
- Counties: Marlboro

Highway system
- South Carolina State Highway System; Interstate; US; State; Scenic
← US 378	→ I-385

South Carolina Highway 381 (SC 381) is a 22.700-mile (36.532 km) primary state highway in the U.S. state of South Carolina. It connects the towns in eastern Marlboro County.

== Route description ==
SC 381 traverses from Blenheim at SC 38 to the North Carolina state line where it continues as North Carolina Highway 381 into Gibson, North Carolina. As a two-lane rural highway, it connects the towns of Clio and McColl.

== History ==
The highway was established in 1930 as a new primary route from SC 38 in Blenheim to SC 9 in Clio. In 1931 or 1932, it was extended north to SC 30 (today U.S. Route 15 (US 15) and US 401) in McColl; and west to the community of Marlboro. In 1934, the western extension was dropped while it extended north again to the North Carolina state line. In 1940, SC 381 was extended west again to SC 382 in Scott, only to be truncated back in Blenheim by 1948.

== Major intersections ==
The entire route is in Marlboro County.

Location	mi	km	Destinations	Notes
Blenheim	0.000	0.000	SC 38 (Main Street) – Bennettsville, Marion	Southern terminus
			I-73	Proposed interchange
Clio	8.390	13.502	SC 9 (Main Street) – Bennettsville, Dillon	
	9.850	15.852	SC 83 north – Maxton	Southern terminus of SC 83
McColl	15.630	25.154	US 15 / US 401 (Tatum Avenue) – Bennettsville, Laurinburg	
	22.700	36.532	NC 381 north (Church Street) – Hamlet	Continuation into North Carolina
1.000 mi = 1.609 km; 1.000 km = 0.621 mi: Unopened
