= North Carolina Highway 22 =

State highway in North Carolina, US

North Carolina Highway 22

- Route of NC 22 highlighted in red

Route information
- Maintained by NCDOT
- Length: 59.3 mi (95.4 km)
- Existed: 1934–present

Major junctions
- South end: NC 2 in Southern Pines
- US 15 / US 501 in Carthage; US 64 in Ramseur
- North end: NC 62 in Climax

Location
- Country: United States
- State: North Carolina
- Counties: Moore, Chatham, Randolph, Guilford

Highway system
- North Carolina Highway System; Interstate; US; State; Scenic
← US 21	→ US 23

North Carolina Highway 22 (NC 22) is a North Carolina state highway that runs in the central-north region of the state. It runs between Southern Pines and Climax. The route is signed north–south, and is 59 miles (95 km) in length.

== Route description ==
NC 22 begins at a roundabout at the junction with NC 2, just shy of the interchange at US 1 in Southern Pines. It heads north along Central Drive and then runs independently after the roundabout at Airport Road. NC 22 then runs concurrent with US 15/US 501 for about 1 mile (1.6 km) before entering Carthage from the south. At the intersection with Monroe Street in Carthage, NC 22 joins NC 24/NC 27 and heads west sharing its concurrency with NC 24 and NC 27 for about 5 miles (8.0 km). NC 22 then heads north again, passing through High Falls before it meets NC 42. From there, NC 22 becomes concurrent with NC 42 heading into Coleridge and intersects the western terminus of NC 902 south of Bennett. After entering Coleridge, NC 22 splits from NC 42 and heads north into Ramseur. It meets US 64 and runs concurrent with it along Jordan Road before heading west through Franklinville. The route continues north until it reaches its northern terminus at the junction of NC 62 in Climax.

== History ==
=== Original NC 22 ===
- The original NC 22 appeared in 1922, running from NC 20 in Whiteville northward toward Fayetteville where it ended at NC 40.
- 1925: NC 22 is realigned coming out of Fayetteville, now going straight southward through Lumberton and then to the South Carolina state border, where it becomes SC 23.
- 1927: US 217's new routing makes the entire NC 22 route also part of that highway.
- 1932: US 301 replaces US 217 on NC 22.
- 2004: A seven-mile (11 km) segment of NC 22 north of Climax is truncated as a result of the construction of the I-85 Greensboro Bypass. NC 22's former northern terminus at US 421 was eliminated. This truncated segment of NC 22 went through the town Pleasant Garden.

=== Current route ===
- 1934: With US 301's entire route being NC 22, the number could be better assigned elsewhere. With the arrival of US 64, NC 22 was reassigned to NC 64. It was then a much shorter highway, running from NC 27 in Carthage to US 421 in Greensboro.
- 1952: NC 22's southern end is aligned to its current ending in Southern Pines.
- 2004: NC 22 is shortened just west of 421 to NC 62 in Climax. Apparently, I-85's relocation to the new southern Greensboro bypass cut off NC 22 from US 421.

== Major intersections ==
County	Location	mi	km	Destinations	Notes
Moore	Southern Pines	0.0	0.0	NC 2 (Midland Road) – Pinehurst	Southern terminus
Moore	Carthage	8.3	13.4	US 15 south / US 501 south – Pinehurst, Aberdeen	South end of US 15/501 overlap
Moore	Carthage	9.2	14.8	US 15 north / US 501 north – Sanford	North end of US 15/501 overlap
Moore	Carthage	11.3	18.2	NC 24 east / NC 27 east (Monroe Street) – Cameron	South end of NC 24 / NC 27 overlap
Moore	Parkwood	16.4	26.4	NC 24 west / NC 27 west – Biscoe	North end of NC 24 / NC 27 overlap
Chatham		27.2	43.8	NC 42 east – Sanford	South end of NC 42 overlap
Chatham	Bennett	28.5	45.9	NC 902 east – Bear Creek, Pittsboro	Western terminus of NC 902
Randolph	Coleridge	36.6	58.9	NC 42 west – Asheboro	North end of NC 42 overlap
Randolph	Ramseur	44.3	71.3	US 64 east / NC 49 north (Jordan Road) – Siler City, Liberty	South end of US 64 / NC 49 overlap
Randolph	Ramseur	44.5	71.6	US 64 west / NC 49 south (Jordan Road) – Asheboro	North end of US 64 / NC 49 overlap
Guilford	Climax	59.3	95.4	NC 62 – High Point, Archdale, Julian, Burlington	Northern terminus at NC 62.
1.000 mi = 1.609 km; 1.000 km = 0.621 mi: Concurrency terminus
