= Tramway, North Carolina =

Coordinates: 35°26′41″N 79°12′52″W

Tramway is an area of Lee County, North Carolina, United States, which politically forms part of Sanford. It is located on U.S. 1/15/501, north of the road's intersection with North Carolina Highway 78. Its elevation is 499 feet or 152 meters. According to one local source, the name of the area derives from a 19th-century tramway used to transport timber to a sawmill inaccessible by wagons, and, presumably, the lumber returned.
