= Manly, North Carolina =

Unincorporated community in North Carolina, US

Coordinates: 35°11′09″N 79°22′18″W

Manly is an unincorporated community in Moore County, in the U.S. state of North Carolina.

== History ==
A post office called Manly was established in 1881, and remained in operation until 1959. The community was named for Charles Manly, 31st Governor of North Carolina.
