= Gibson, North Carolina =

- Town
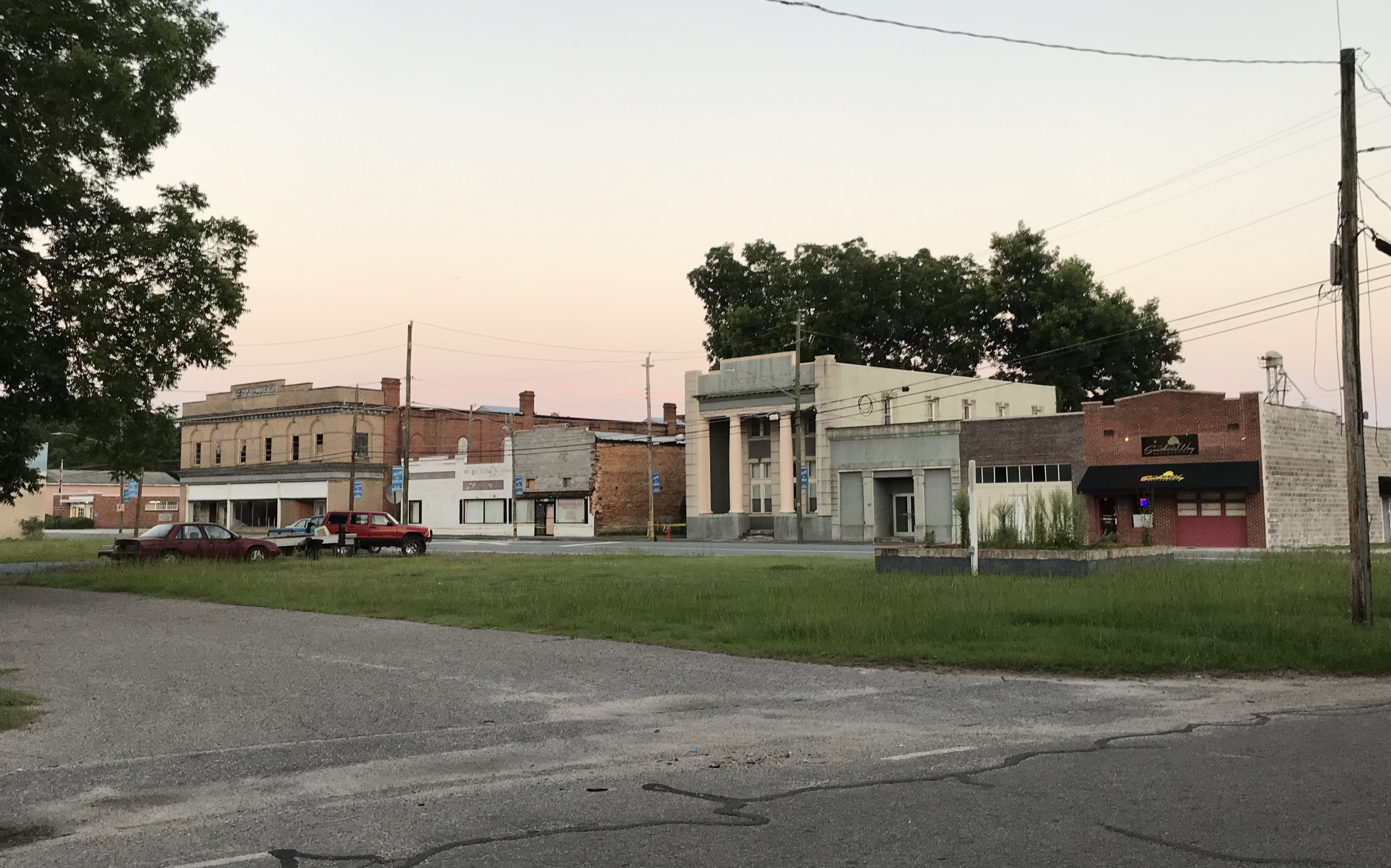

- Location in Scotland County and the state of North Carolina.
- Coordinates: 34°45′34″N 79°36′25″W
- Country: United States
- State: North Carolina
- County: Scotland

Government
  - Type: Town Commission
  - Mayor: Eric Stubbs

Area
  - Total: 0.98 sq mi (2.53 km^{2})
  - Land: 0.98 sq mi (2.53 km^{2})
  - Water: 0 sq mi (0.00 km^{2})
- Elevation: 249 ft (76 m)

Population (2020)
  - Total: 449
  - Density: 460.2/sq mi (177.67/km^{2})
- Time zone: UTC-5 (Eastern (EST))
  - Summer (DST): UTC-4 (EDT)
- ZIP code: 28343
- Area codes: 910, 472
- FIPS code: 37-25940
- GNIS feature ID: 2406564
- Website: https://gibsonnc.com/

Gibson is a town in Scotland County, North Carolina, United States. As of the 2020 census, Gibson had a population of 449.

== History ==
Gibson was originally located in Richmond County, North Carolina. A post office was built in the area in 1846, and the town was named for its first postmaster, Noah Gibson. In 1883 the Raleigh and Augusta Air Line Railroad made plans to build a spur line to Gibson to bring goods to the locale and ship cotton out from local residents to markets. In anticipation of the railroad connection, Gibson residents erected a depot, hotel, academy, and several additional stores. The spur was built in 1884 and opened on July 1 with daily rail service to Hamlet. In 1891 the Charleston, Sumter and Northern Railroad line from Bennettsville, South Carolina was linked to the Air Line at the Gibson depot. Scotland County was created in 1899 and Gibson became a part of the new jurisdiction. The town was incorporated that year. In 1904 a bank was established. A civic ruritan club was founded in 1946. The rail depot was later restored and turned into a community center.

== Geography ==
According to the United States Census Bureau, the town has a total area of 1.0 square mile (2.6 km^{2}), all of it land.

== Demographics ==
Historical population
Census	Pop.	Note	%±
1920	264		—
1930	417		58.0%
1940	435		4.3%
1950	609		40.0%
1960	501		−17.7%
1970	502		0.2%
1980	533		6.2%
1990	532		−0.2%
2000	584		9.8%
2010	540		−7.5%
2020	449		−16.9%
U.S. Decennial Census

As of the census of 2000, there were 584 people, 213 households, and 146 families residing in the town. The population density was 595.1 people per square mile (229.8 people/km^{2}). There were 247 housing units at an average density of 251.7 per square mile (97.2/km^{2}). The racial makeup of the town was 49.66% White, 42.12% African American, 6.85% Native American, 0.68% from other races, and 0.68% from two or more races. Hispanic or Latino of any race were 0.86% of the population.

There were 213 households, out of which 34.7% had children under the age of 18 living with them, 40.4% were married couples living together, 23.5% had a female householder with no husband present, and 31.0% were non-families. 29.1% of all households were made up of individuals, and 18.8% had someone living alone who was 65 years of age or older. The average household size was 2.72 and the average family size was 3.37.

In the town, the population was spread out, with 32.4% under the age of 18, 9.2% from 18 to 24, 24.3% from 25 to 44, 17.1% from 45 to 64, and 17.0% who were 65 years of age or older. The median age was 33 years. For every 100 females, there were 85.4 males. For every 100 females age 18 and over, there were 75.6 males.

The median income for a household in the town was $21,696, and the median income for a family was $27,125. Males had a median income of $27,143 versus $19,167 for females. The per capita income for the town was $15,542. About 24.1% of families and 23.6% of the population were below the poverty line, including 36.6% of those under age 18 and 15.3% of those age 65 or over.

== Works cited ==
- Carmichael, Billy III (September 30, 1950). "Gibson—Cotton Town". The State. Vol. 18, no. 18. pp. 6–7, 16.
- Carriker, S. David; Linder, Suzanne C. (1982). Railroading in Richmond County. Hamlet: Richmond Technical College. OCLC 9424143.
- Powell, William S. (1976). The North Carolina Gazetteer: A Dictionary of Tar Heel Places. Chapel Hill: The University of North Carolina Press. ISBN 9780807812471.
