= North Carolina Highway System =

Network of state-managed highways and roads

- Highway markers for Interstate Highways, U.S. Highways and State Highways

System information
- Length: 80,483 mi (129,525 km)
- Notes: Second largest state-maintained highway network in the United States; state roads maintained by the NCDOT.

Highway names
- Interstates: Interstate X (I-X)
- US Highways: U.S. Highway X (US X)
- State: North Carolina Highway X (NC X)

System links
- North Carolina Highway System; Interstate; US; State; Scenic

The North Carolina Highway System consists of a vast network of Interstate, United States, and state highways, managed by the North Carolina Department of Transportation. North Carolina has the second largest state maintained highway network in the United States because all roads in North Carolina are maintained by either municipalities or the state. Since counties do not maintain roads, there is no such thing as a "county road" within the state.

== Numbering ==
Current North Carolina highway marker design

North Carolina routes may be referred to as "North Carolina Highway x", "N.C. Highway x", "NC Route x", or just "NC x", where x is the route number. North Carolina state highways numbered under 1000 are primary state highways, and numbers greater than or equal to 1000 are secondary. Nearly all secondary highways also have other names, and many primary routes are also signed with other titles.

=== Signage ===
Primary highways are marked by a black square sign in which is a white equilateral diamond shape with rounded corners that contains the route number. The diamond shape does not alter to accommodate larger route numbers; the numbers are reduced in size to fit within the diamond. Michigan is the only other state, aside from North Carolina, to have a near-identical route shield, but with pointed corners and an M in Michigan's shield. Secondary highways are not signed with route markers; small green or white signs are most commonly used to designate secondary roads. On these signs, the prefix "SR" for "secondary road" sometimes precedes the road number.

=== Rules and exceptions ===
Typically, North Carolina highway route numbers do not share numbers with any U.S. Highway or Interstate Highway in the state. If a new highway is established that would have the same number as a state highway, the state highway number usually changes. North Carolina grants exceptions to this rule in limited cases. Sometimes, as in NC 540/I-540; the two routes are given the same number because they are seen as a continuous route. Other times, as in NC 295, the number is a place holder for when the highway is eventually upgraded to an Interstate route when it meets certain standards. Finally, as in NC 73, sometimes the state, for whatever reason, does not remove a former state route designation when the Interstate is signed.

=== Secondary roads ===
According to NCDOT, the secondary road (SR) system of the state "consists of those roads maintained by the Department of Transportation that do not carry 'NC' or 'US' numbers and are outside the boundary of any incorporated municipality."

Unlike highways in the primary system, secondary road numbers may be repeated multiple times throughout the system, provided that they are not repeated within the same county. For example, SR 2000 may refer to the physical roadway signed as Wake Forest Road or Falls of Neuse Road in Wake County, or it may refer to the physical roadway signed as Hickory Grove Road in Gaston County. Some road numbers are quite common. In fact, the designation SR1101 is currently used, or has in the past, been used nearly 100 times by almost every county in the state.

Secondary roads that cross a county line are generally given a new number in the new county. For example, while Morrisville Parkway (9.11 miles [14.66 km] in length) crosses the Chatham—Wake county line, the name also changes at the line to Lewter Shop Road. Morrisville Parkway in Wake County (7.08 miles [11.39 km] in length) is designated SR 3060 while Lewter Shop Road in Chatham County (2.03 miles [3.27 km] in length) is designated SR 1740. The exception to this rule applies to roads designated SR10xx, which are generally given to regionally significant roads or roads crossing one or more county lines, but which are not part of the primary system. For example, SR 1006 (Old Stage Road) is located both in Wake and Harnett counties.

The significance of secondary road numbers is almost exclusive to NCDOT operations, generally maintenance, rather than for navigational purposes by the driving public. Certainly, the secondary road numbering system is not organized to help unfamiliar motorists find their way. Rather, this is the job of the road names, which are generally established at the local level, but which often share a sign with an SR designation for convenience. In some rural areas of the state, including parts of the Mountain and Coastal Plain regions, roads may lack a road name, in which case they are known by the SR designation.

It is not uncommon for maintenance responsibility of secondary roads to transfer from NCDOT to particular municipalities as they increase in size due to annexation. When this occurs, the SR designations are eliminated. The SR road designation is also eliminated from physical roadways that are elevated into the primary system. For example, NC 157 (Guess Road) in Durham and Person counties was once a secondary road designated SR 1008. Although it ascended into the primary system years ago, some of the old signs identifying Guess Road as SR 1008 remain.

== Bicycle routes ==
- U.S. Bicycle Route 1: Carolina Connection
- North Carolina Bicycle Route 2: Mountains to Sea
- North Carolina Bicycle Route 3: Ports of Call
- North Carolina Bicycle Route 4: North Line Trace
- North Carolina Bicycle Route 5: Cape Fear Run
- North Carolina Bicycle Route 6: Piedmont Spur
- North Carolina Bicycle Route 7: Ocracoke Option
- North Carolina Bicycle Route 8: Southern Highlands
- Sandhills Sector

== Toll roads and bridges ==
- Monroe Expressway: toll road in Union County designated as a bypass route for U.S. Route 74 in Union County.
- Triangle Expressway: first modern toll road in North Carolina, located in Durham and Wake counties.

== Other routes and highways ==
- All American Freeway: a secondary road freeway connecting Fort Bragg with central Fayetteville.
- Blue Ridge Parkway: a two-lane National Parkway and All-American Road, that traverses 252.1 miles (405.7 km) from the Great Smoky Mountains National Park to the Virginia state line.
- Bryan Boulevard: a freeway spur connecting I-73 to downtown Greensboro.
- Cary Parkway: a partial ring road that travels northern, western and central areas of Cary, also giving the western areas in Cary access to US 1.
- Charlotte Route 4: a partial ring road that is signed by Charlotte DOT.
- Cherohala Skyway: a National Scenic Byway, located west of Robbinsville.
- Great Smoky Mountains Expressway: a four-lane divided highway in southwestern North Carolina; broken in three section along US 74, between Bryson City and Clyde.
- Kernersville Loop: under construction route which would loop around the central areas of Kernersville, with the south section slated to be a boulevard and street, while the north and east section would be partly of expressway grade. Salem Parkway (US 421) would be used to connect the center inside the loop, while currently carrying NC 150 to connect with the northeast quadrant of the loop. The entire loop would also connect the overall town with I-40 and I-74, while giving access to the center of Downtown Winston-Salem with Salem Parkway (US 421).
- Salem Parkway: an artery which carries US 421, while being divided under I-74 (Winston-Salem Beltway). The parkway serves Downtown Winston-Salem and Downtown Kernersville, with access to I-40 on both termini of the parkway.
- Silas Creek Parkway: a partial loop that travels through western Winston-Salem.
- Wade Avenue: a corridor which uses a freeway grade to connect I-40 to I-440/US 1, and boulevard grade to connect to U.S. 401 in Raleigh.

== History ==
North Carolina highway marker design utilized from 1949 to 1969

The original highway numbering system for North Carolina was established in the 1920s. Major routes were multiples of 10, with 10, 20, and 90 running east–west, 30, 40, 50, 70, and 80 running north–south, and 60 running as a diagonal route. These cross-state routes were used as a basis for numbering the two-digit roads that served as the major city-city connectors. For example, NC 90 used to run along modern US 64, which explains the multiple "90s" that branch off US 64 today (NC 9, NC 97 and NC 98).

Three-digit numbered roads were less important spurs off the two-digit roads and often served as rural connectors. These were numbered in a scheme opposite of the U.S. and Interstate auxiliary routes; the spur routes received an extra "ones" digit instead of an extra "hundreds" digit. The first spur received the number "xx1" and the second received "xx2", where xx is the parent route number. This explains the predomination of such routes as 751, 191, 561, and the relatively few "xx0" routes (which would be the 10th assigned spur route ... few parent routes would have spurs numbered this high).

In 1933-34 many roads were renumbered to eliminate conflicts with the U.S. highways now crisscrossing the state. Some numbers (50, 90), which had become effectively U.S. routes (1 and 64 respectively) were moved or eliminated while others that conflicted with established U.S. route numbers in the state were changed to non-conflicting numbers. This seems to have been done without regard to the earlier numbering system, as were all future additions to the state highway system, which is where the modern "lack of any system" system came to be.

In 1937, several routes were renumbered to be contiguous with South Carolina routes, and in 1940 the same happened with Virginia. No effort has ever been made to match up with Tennessee or Georgia routes, but most cross-border numbered roads along this area are already U.S. highways anyway.

In 1961, the routes that conflicted with Interstates were renumbered.

Highway renumbering has since been sporadic, with most being place-holders for a future Interstate route (i.e. NC 752 and NC 295). One exception being a state law passed in 2002 swapping the highway numbers of NC 136 and NC 3; the reason was in tribute to Dale Earnhardt who died in the 2001 Daytona 500, who drove the number #3 Goodwrench Chevrolet and lived in Kannapolis.

== See also ==
- North Carolina State Ports Authority
- North Carolina Ferry System
- North Carolina Scenic Byways
