= North Carolina Highway 45 =

State highway in North Carolina, US

North Carolina Highway 45
- NC 45 highlighted in red; Swan Quarter-Ocracoke ferry highlighted in blue

Route information
- Maintained by NCDOT
- Length: 121.7 mi (195.9 km)
- Existed: 1940–present
- Tourist routes: Pamlico Scenic Byway

Major junctions
- South end: NC 12 / Swan Quarter-Ocracoke Ferry in Ocracoke
- US 264 in Swan Quarter; US 17 near Merry Hill
- North end: US 13 / US 158 near Winton

Location
- Country: United States
- State: North Carolina
- Counties: Hyde, Beaufort, Washington, Bertie, Hertford

Highway system
- North Carolina Highway System; Interstate; US; State; Scenic
← NC 43	→ NC 46

North Carolina Highway 45 (NC 45) is a primary state highway in the U.S. state of North Carolina. The highway traverses north–south, from Ocracoke to Winton.

== Route description ==
NC 45 starts at the ferry terminal at Ocracoke, connecting with NC 12, it traverses across the Pamlico Sound along the Swan Quarter-Ocracoke Ferry. At Swan Quarter, it continues at a northwesterly direction; merging with several highways along the way, including US 264, NC 99, NC 32, US 64, NC 308, and NC 461. North of Plymouth, it parallels west of the Chowan River before reaching its northern terminus at US 13/US 158, near Winton.

== History ==
On May 1, 2013, NC 45 was extended south from Swan Quarter to its current southern terminus in Ocracoke, crossing over the Pamlico Sound along the Swan Quarter-Ocracoke Ferry. NC 45 does not traverse beyond the ferry terminal.

== Major intersections ==
County	Location	mi	km	Destinations	Notes
Hyde	Ocracoke	0.0	0.0	NC 12	
Hyde	Pamlico Sound	0.2– 30.2	0.32– 48.6	Swan Quarter-Ocracoke Ferry	
Hyde	Swan Quarter	31.3	50.4	NC 94 north (Main Street) to US 264 east – Columbia	Southern terminus of NC 94
Hyde	Swan Quarter	33.5	53.9	US 264 east – Manteo	South end of US 264 overlap
Hyde		48.7	78.4	US 264 west – Belhaven	North end of US 264 overlap
Beaufort	Union Grove	59.1	95.1	NC 99 south (Pungo Road) – Pantego	South end of NC 99 overlap
Hyde	No major junctions				
Washington		70.3	113.1	NC 32 south / NC 99 – Washington	South end of NC 32 and northern terminus of NC 99
Washington		73.6	118.4	NC 32 north (Washington Street) – Plymouth	North end of NC 32 overlap
Washington		77.0	123.9	US 64 west / NC 32 south – Plymouth, Williamston	West end of US 64 and south end of NC 32 overlap
Washington		77.3	124.4	US 64 east / NC 32 north – Roper, Columbia	East end of US 64 and north end of NC 32 overlap
Washington		78.8	126.8	NC 308 east (Mackeys Road) – Mackeys	East end of NC 308 overlap
Bertie		82.7	133.1	NC 308 west (Cooper Hill Road) – Windsor	West end of NC 308 overlap
Bertie		99.7	160.5	US 17 – Windsor, Williamston, Edenton, Hertford	
Bertie	Colerain	102.6	165.1	NC 42 west (River Street) – Powellsville, Ahoskie	Eastern terminus of NC 42
Hertford	Harrellsville	110.9	178.5	NC 561 west – Ahoskie, Rich Square	Eastern terminus of NC 561
Hertford		116.2	187.0	NC 461 east (Farmers Chemical Road)	East end of NC 461 overlap
Hertford	Winton	120.8	194.4	NC 461 west (Old Highway 13) – Ahoskie	West end of NC 461 overlap
Hertford	Winton	121.7	195.9	US 13 / US 158 – Ahoskie, Murfreesboro, Sunbury	West end of US 158 overlap
1.000 mi = 1.609 km; 1.000 km = 0.621 mi: Concurrency terminus

== See also ==
- North Carolina Bicycle Route 2 - concurrent with NC 45 from Swan Quarter to the northern US 264 intersection
