= North Carolina Highway 94 =

State highway in North Carolina, US

North Carolina Highway 94

Route information
- Maintained by NCDOT
- Length: 73.5 mi (118.3 km)
- Existed: 1930–present
- Tourist routes: Alligator River Route; Edenton-Windsor Loop

Major junctions
- South end: NC 45 in Swan Quarter
- US 264 in Swan Quarter; US 64 in Columbia
- North end: NC 32 near Edenton

Location
- Country: United States
- State: North Carolina
- Counties: Hyde, Tyrrell, Washington, Chowan

Highway system
- North Carolina Highway System; Interstate; US; State; Scenic
← NC 93	→ I-95

North Carolina Highway 94 (NC 94) is a primary state highway in the U.S. state of North Carolina. It runs from Hyde County in Swan Quarter to Chowan County near Edenton.

== Route description ==
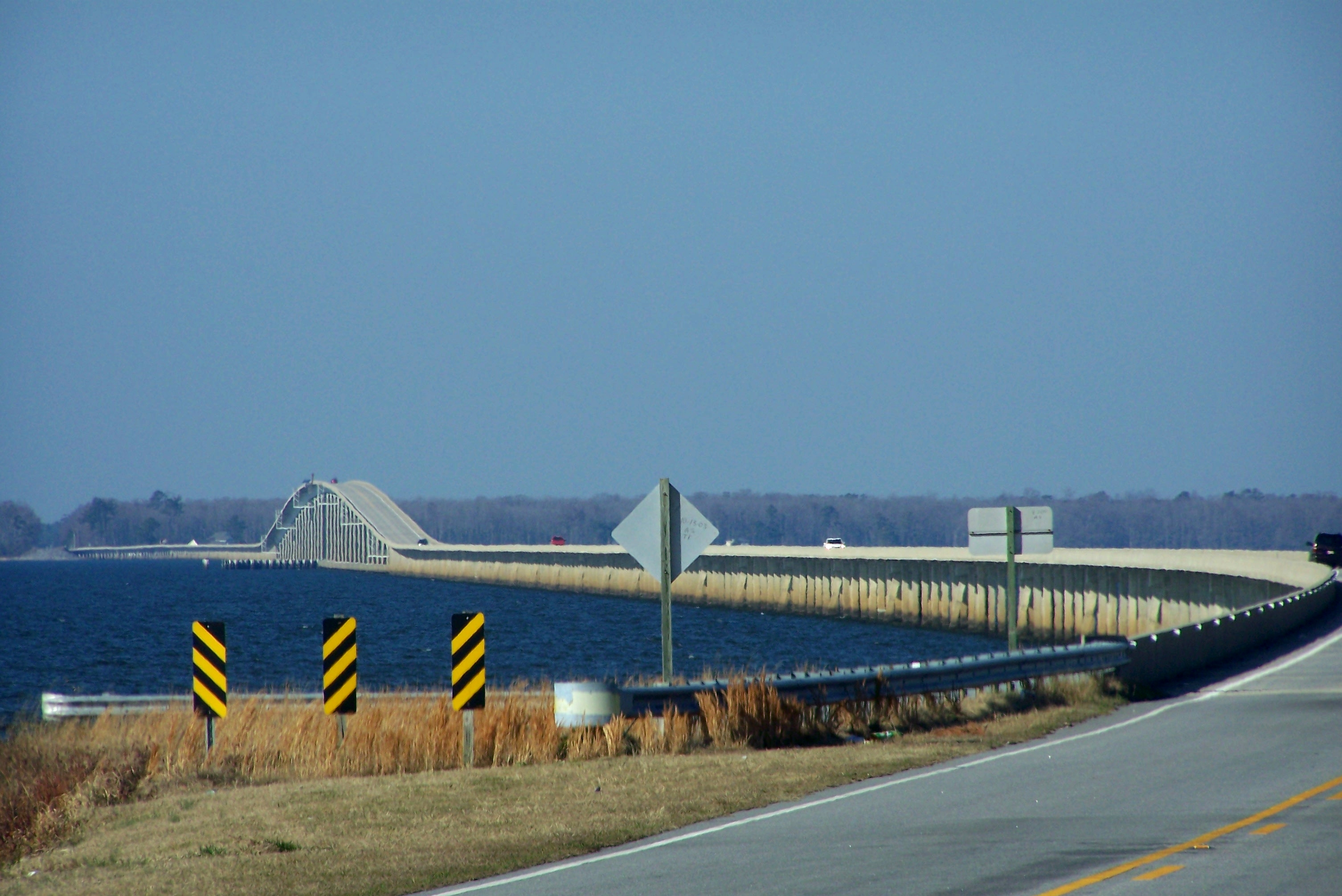
Albemarle Sound Bridge

The route spans the Albemarle Sound at the 3.5-mile (5.6 km) Albemarle Sound Bridge, connecting Chowan and Washington Counties. It also crosses Lake Mattamuskeet at the Mattamuskeet National Wildlife Refuge. The highway passes through the following municipalities:

- Swan Quarter, North Carolina
- Fairfield, North Carolina
- Columbia, North Carolina
- Creswell, North Carolina

== History ==
NC 94 was established in 1930 as a new primary spur routing from NC 91, in Swindell Fork to Fairfield. In 1931, NC 94 was extended north on new primary routing to NC 90, in Columbia. In 1935, NC 94's southern terminus was rerouted to US 264, in Rose Bay; the reroute was a swap with NC 6. In 1942, NC 94 was rerouted at Fairfield onto new primary routing directly south through Lake Mattamuskeet. The nearly 6-mile (9.7 km) causeway connects directly with US 264 near New Holland; the former alignment that went around the western banks of Lake Mattamuskeet were downgraded to secondary roads (Piney Woods Road (SR 1305) and Turnpike Road (SR 1304)).

In 2000, NC 94 was extended both directions: At Lake Comfort, it goes west on a 7-mile (11 km) concurrency with US 264 to Swan Quarter, where it then splits off onto Main Street and continues till it reaches NC 45, its current southern terminus. At Columbia, NC 94 goes west on a 17-mile (27 km) concurrency with US 64 near Pea Ridge, where it then switches concurrences with NC 32. Traveling north, it crosses over the Albemarle Sound, then separates from NC 32 near St. Johns. On Soundside Road, it connects with Northeastern Regional Airport before reconnecting with NC 32 near Edenton and its current northern terminus. In 2003, US 64 was rerouted onto new primary routing through Washington County and part of Tyrrell County, leaving NC 94 continuing along its former alignment.

== Major intersections ==
County	Location	mi	km	Destinations	Notes
Hyde	Swan Quarter	0.0	0.0	NC 45 (Oyster Creek Street / Main Street)	Southern terminus
Hyde	Swan Quarter	1.5	2.4	US 264 west – Belhaven	West end of US 264 overlap
Hyde	Lake Comfort	8.5	13.7	US 264 east – Engelhard	East end of US 264 overlap
Tyrrell	Columbia	43.5	70.0	US 64 east / US 64 Bus. east (Broad Street) – Manteo	East end of US 64 overlap; Western terminus of US 64 Bus.
Tyrrell		44.6	71.8	US 64 west – Plymouth	West end of US 64 overlap
Washington		60.5	97.4	NC 32 / NC 37 south – Roper, Plymouth	South end of NC 32 and NC 37 overlap
Albemarle Sound		62.6– 66.1	100.7– 106.4	Albemarle Sound Bridge	
Chowan		67.4	108.5	NC 32 (Haughton Road) / NC 37 north – Edenton	North end of NC 32 and NC 37 overlap
Chowan		73.5	118.3	NC 32 (Yeopim Road/Poplar Neck Road) / Hobbs Lane – Edenton, Roper	Northern terminus
1.000 mi = 1.609 km; 1.000 km = 0.621 mi: Concurrency terminus
