= North Carolina Highway 32 =

State highway in North Carolina, US

North Carolina Highway 32

Route information
- Maintained by NCDOT
- Length: 103.4 mi (166.4 km)
- Existed: 1921–present
- Tourist routes: Edenton-Windsor Loop; Pamlico Scenic Byway

Major junctions
- South end: US 17 Bus. in Washington
- US 264 near Bath; US 64 at Plymouth; US 17 in Edenton; US 158 at Sunbury
- North end: SR 32 at the Virginia state line near Corapeake

Location
- Country: United States
- State: North Carolina
- Counties: Beaufort, Washington, Chowan, Gates

Highway system
- North Carolina Highway System; Interstate; US; State; Scenic
← NC 30	→ NC 33

North Carolina Highway 32 (NC 32) is a primary state highway in the U.S. state of North Carolina; it goes through several counties and small communities in the northeastern Inner Banks part of the state. It is 103 miles (166 km) in length, and crosses the Albemarle Sound south of Edenton, along with NC 37 and NC 94. The highway continues into Virginia as SR 32.

== History ==
North Carolina Highway 32 was established in 1921, becoming a part of the original North Carolina Highway System. Initially, the highway was routed from NC 30-34 (now US 158) in Sunbury south to NC 342 (now US 17) in Edenton.

From 1921 to 1924, NC 32 used portions of present-day SR 1303. In 1924, the highway was put on its modern routing between Edenton and Sunbury. In 1934, NC 32 was extended north through Corapeake to Virginia, replacing a portion of NC 30.

In 1940, the highway was extended southeast of Edenton as new primary routing, then replaced NC 172 across the Albemarle Sound to US 64. NC 32 was duplexed with US 64 west to Plymouth and replaced NC 97 to US 264, near Bunyan. Approximately 10 years later, NC 32 (with US 64) received a new bypass of Plymouth, replacing SR 1325.

In 1955, NC 32 (with US 64) received a new bypass of Roper, replacing the former state road. In the early 1980s, the highway was later extended underneath US 264 and west through Washington Park to its present-day ending.

== Route description ==
NC 32 traverses the Coastal Plains of North Carolina, with many swamps and pine barrens along the route. The highway spans four counties in the state; Beaufort, Chowan, Gates, and Washington. It is approximately 103 miles in total length.

== Major intersections ==
County	Location	mi	km	Destinations	Notes
Beaufort	Washington	0.0	0.0	US 17 Bus. (Bridge Street) – Chocowinity, Williamston	Southern terminus
Beaufort	Washington	8.3	13.4	US 264 / NC 92 (Wr Bill Roberson Jr. Highway) – Greenville, Pantego, Bath	
Washington		32.0	51.5	NC 45 south / NC 99 south – Pantego, Swan Quarter	South end of NC 45 overlap; Northern terminus of NC 99
Washington	Plymouth	35.3	56.8	NC 45 north – Colerain	North end of concurrency with NC 45
Washington	Plymouth	36.7	59.1	US 64 west – Jamesville	West end of US 64 overlap
Washington	Plymouth	39.5	63.6	NC 45 – Swan Quarter, Colerain	Brief 0.3 mile overlap with NC 45
Washington	Roper	40.6	65.3	US 64 east – Creswell	East end of US 64 ovelap
Washington	Mackeys	48.2	77.6	NC 308 west (Mackeys Road) – Windsor	Eastern terminus of NC 308
Washington		53.4	85.9	NC 37 / NC 94 south – Columbia	South end of NC 37 and NC 94 overlap
Albemarle Sound				Albemarle Sound Bridge	
Chowan		60.2	96.9	NC 94 north (Soundside Road) – Northeastern Regional Airport	Northern terminus of NC 94
Chowan	St. Johns	60.9	98.0	NC 37 north (Haughton Road) – Hertford	North end of NC 37 overlap
Chowan	Edenton	66.1	106.4	US 17 Bus. south (Broad Street)	South end of Business US 17 overlap
Chowan	Edenton	66.7	107.3	US 17 Bus. north (Broad Street)	North end of Business US 17 overlap
Chowan	Edenton	67.3	108.3	US 17 (Ocean Highway) – Windsor, Hertford	Diamond interchange
Chowan	Gliden	86.2	138.7	NC 37 south (Gliden Road) – Winfall	South end of NC 37 overlap
Gates	Mintonsville	88.3	142.1	NC 37 north – Gatesville	North end of NC 37 overlap
Gates	Sunbury	95.2	153.2	US 158 – Winton, Elizabeth City	
Gates		103.5	166.6	SR 32 north (Carolina Road) – Newport News	Northern terminus; Virginia state line
1.000 mi = 1.609 km; 1.000 km = 0.621 mi: Concurrency terminus
