= North Carolina Highway 37 =

State highway in North Carolina, US

North Carolina Highway 37

Route information
- Maintained by NCDOT
- Length: 60.0 mi (96.6 km)
- Existed: 1934–present
- Tourist routes: Perquimans Crossing

Major junctions
- South end: US 64 near Beasley
- US 17 near Hertford; US 158 near of Gatesville
- North end: US 13 near Gates

Location
- Country: United States
- State: North Carolina
- Counties: Washington, Chowan, Perquimans, Gates

Highway system
- North Carolina Highway System; Interstate; US; State; Scenic
← NC 36	→ NC 38

North Carolina Highway 37 (NC 37) is a primary state highway in the northeastern part of the U.S. state of North Carolina. Traveling north–south, it serves as a connector route from U.S. Route 64 (US 64) to Hertford and from US 13 to Gatesville.

== Route description ==
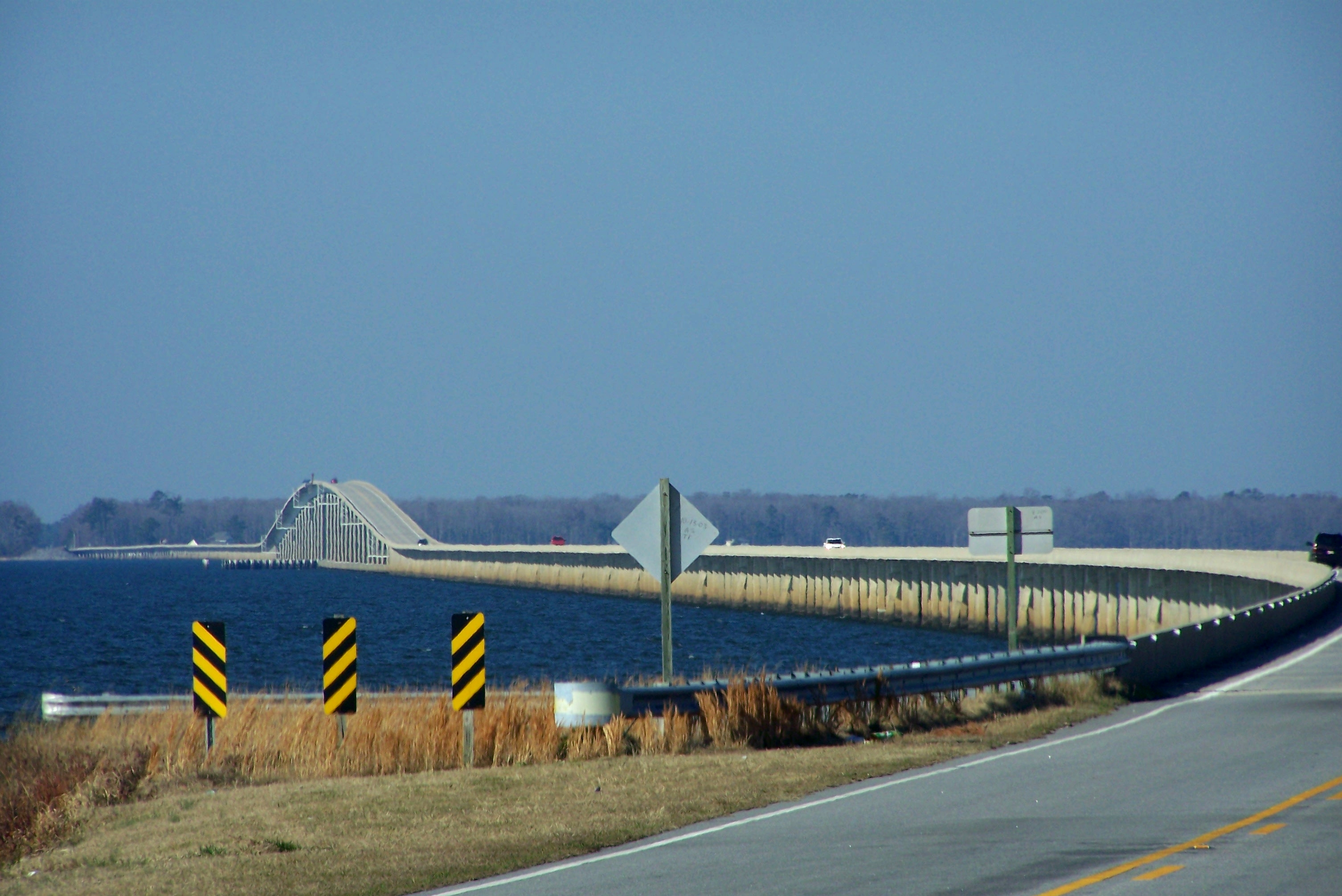
Albemarle Sound Bridge

NC 37 is a predominantly two-lane rural highway which travels 60 miles (97 km) from US 64 near Beasley to US 13 near Gates. Beginning at exit 548, along US 64, NC 37 travels northeasterly for 3.4 miles (5.5 km) before running concurrent with NC 32 and NC 94 near Pea Ridge. Crossing over the Albemarle Sound and entering Chowan County from Washington County, NC 94 splits off towards the Northeastern Regional Airport, followed by NC 32 which heads directly towards Edenton. Entering Perquimans County, it merges with US 17 for a 9-mile (14 km) concurrency. Connecting with the city of Hertford, it switches concurrences with U.S. Route 17 Business (US 17 Bus.) in Winfall. After a 0.9-mile (1.4 km) concurrency, it travels solo again as it goes through downtown Winfall then northeasterly through Belvidere. At Gliden, it rejoins NC 32 for a short concurrency, entering Gates County and through Mintonsville, before separating again at Mitchells Fork. Traveling through the communities of Willow and Vivian, it goes through downtown Gatesville, where it shares a short concurrency with US 158 Bus. Continuing north, it connects with US 158 at Eleanors Crossroads. After traveling through the communities of Buckland and Gates, it ends at US 13 one mile (1.6 km) from the Virginia state line.

NC 37 shares part of the Edenton-Windsor Loop where it crosses the Albemarle Sound (indicated by a Scenic Byways sign). The loop, which connects to nearby Edenton and Windsor, showcases historic sites, like the Cupola House and the Rehoboth Methodist Church, and scenic views of the Inner Banks. NC 37 is also part of the Historic Albemarle Tour, though no actual historic sites or museums are located along its route.

== History ==
NC 37 was established in 1934 as a renumbering of NC 321 from US 17 in Winfall to SR 53 at the Virginia state line. In 1940, NC 37 was extended south in concurrency with US 17 into Chowan County, where it then replaced a segment of NC 172 to NC 32 in St. Johns. In 1952, NC 37 was truncated at US 13, one mile (1.6 km) from the Virginia state line. In March 1987, NC 37 was rerouted onto new bypass route, in concurrency with US 17, east of Hertford. North of Hertford, it then shares a concurrency with US 17 Bus. before returning on its routing towards Winfall; its old alignment was replaced by US 17 Bus.

In June 2016, NC 37 was extended south from St. Johns, in a concurrency with NC 32 and NC 94, into Washington County near Beasley; it splits onto new primary routing to its southern terminus at US 64's exit 548.

=== North Carolina Highway 321 ===
North Carolina Highway 321
- Location: Winfall–VA state line
- Length: 33.8 mi (54.4 km)
- Existed: 1921–1934

North Carolina Highway 321 (NC 321) was an original state highway that traversed from NC 342, in Winfall, northwest to NC 32, in Gilden. In 1928, NC 321 was extended northwest, on new primary routing, to NC 30, in Gatesville. In 1932, NC 32 was extended north again, on new primary routing, to the Virginia state line; the following year Virginia extended SR 53 to the state line to connect with NC 321. In 1934, because of US 321 existing in the state, NC 321 was renumbered to NC 37.

== Major intersections ==
County	Location	mi	km	Destinations	Notes
Washington		0.0	0.0	US 64 – Creswell, Columbia, Plymouth	Exit 548 (US 64)
Washington	Pea Ridge	3.4	5.5	NC 32 / NC 94 south – Creswell, Columbia, Plymouth	South end of NC 32 and NC 94 overlap
Albemarle Sound		7.4	11.9	Albemarle Sound Bridge	
Chowan		10.5	16.9	NC 94 (Soundside Road) – Northeastern Regional Airport	North end of NC 94 overlap
Chowan	St. Johns	11.1	17.9	NC 32 north (Poplar Neck Road) / Indian Trail Road – Edenton	North end of NC 32 overlap
Perquimans		15.5	24.9	US 17 south (Ocean Highway) – Edenton	South end of US 17 overlap
Perquimans	Hertford	21.7	34.9	US 17 Bus. north (Edenton Road Street) – Hertford	Southern terminus of US 17 Bus.
Perquimans	Winfall	24.9	40.1	US 17 north / US 17 Bus. begins (Creek Road) / New Hope Road – Elizabeth City	North end of US 17 and south end of US 17 Bus. overlap
Perquimans	Winfall	25.8	41.5	US 17 Bus. south (Church Street) – Hertford	North end of US 17 Bus. overlap
Perquimans	Gliden	40.1	64.5	NC 32 south (Virginia Road) – Edenton	South end of NC 32 overlap
Gates	Mitchells Fork	42.0	67.6	NC 32 north – Sunbury	North end of NC 32 overlap
Gates	Gatesville	50.7	81.6	NC 137 west (Court Street)	Eastern terminus of NC 137
Gates	Gatesville	51.0	82.1	US 158 Bus. east (Maple Street) – Sunbury	East end of US 158 Bus. overlap
Gates		51.9	83.5	US 158 Bus. west – Winton	West end of US 158 Bus. overlap
Gates	Eleanors Crossroads	52.5	84.5	US 158 – Winton, Sunbury	
Gates		60.0	96.6	US 13 – Suffolk, Ahoskie	
1.000 mi = 1.609 km; 1.000 km = 0.621 mi: Concurrency terminus

== See also ==
- North Carolina Bicycle Route 4 - concurrent with NC 37 from Walton Crossroads to Gatesville at NC 137
