= North Carolina Highway 308 =

State highway in North Carolina, US

North Carolina Highway 308

Route information
- Maintained by NCDOT
- Length: 52.9 mi (85.1 km)
- Existed: 1933–present

Major junctions
- West end: US 258 / NC 561 near Rich Square
- US 13 / US 17 in Windsor
- East end: NC 32 in Pleasant Grove

Location
- Country: United States
- State: North Carolina
- Counties: Northampton, Bertie, Washington

Highway system
- North Carolina Highway System; Interstate; US; State; Scenic
← NC 307	→ US 311

North Carolina Highway 308 (NC 308) is a primary state highway in the U.S. state of North Carolina. It serves mainly to connect the city of Windsor to communities and towns in eastern Bertie County.

== Route description ==
NC 308 is a two-lane rural highway that traverses 52.9 miles (85.1 km) from US 258 and NC 561 near Rich Square to NC 32 in Pleasant Grove. The highway provides a direct link for Roxobel, Kelford, and Lewiston Woodville to Windsor, the county seat of Bertie County. Continuing east, it crosses the Roanoke River, forms a concurrency with NC 45 and North Carolina Bicycle Route 3, then connects the communities of Westover and Mackeys, before ending at NC 32 in Pleasant Grove.

=== Scenic byways ===
Edenton-Windsor Loop is an 87-mile (140 km) is a double loop byway connecting the cities of Edenton and Windsor. NC 308 covers 24.8 miles (39.9 km) of the loop from Windsor to Pleasant Grove. The byway is noted for historical homes in Edenton, the Sans Souci Ferry, the scenic river and coastal views, and history.

== History ==
Established in 1933 as a new primary routing, it went from US 258/NC 12 near Rich Square to NC 30 (today's US 13 Business) at Granville Street in Windsor. In 1975, NC 308 was extended east to NC 45. Between 1980 and 1982, NC 308 was extended again to its current eastern terminus in Pleasant Grove.

== Junction list ==
County	Location	mi	km	Destinations	Notes
Northampton		0.0	0.0	US 258 / NC 561 – Rich Square, Scotland Neck	
Bertie	Lewiston Woodville	12.4	20.0	NC 11 / NC 42 – Oak City, Aulander, Ahoskie	
Bertie	Windsor	27.3	43.9	US 13 / US 17 – Williamston, Ahoskie, Edenton	
Bertie	Windsor	28.1	45.2	US 13 Bus. south (Granville Street)	South end of US 13 Bus. overlap
Bertie	Windsor	28.4	45.7	US 13 Bus. north (King Street)	North end of US 13 Bus. overlap
Bertie	Windsor	28.8	46.3	US 17 Bus. south (Water Street) – Williamston	South end of US 17 Bus. overlap
Bertie	Windsor	30.0	48.3	US 17 Bus. north (King Street) – Edenton	North end of US 17 Bus. overlap
Bertie		41.8	67.3	NC 45 north – Colerain	North end of NC 45 overlap
Washington		45.7	73.5	NC 45 south – Plymouth	South end of NC 45 overlap
Washington	Pleasant Grove	52.9	85.1	NC 32 – Roper, Edenton	
1.000 mi = 1.609 km; 1.000 km = 0.621 mi: Concurrency terminus

== Special routes ==
=== Windsor truck route ===
North Carolina Highway 308 Truck
- Location: Windsor, North Carolina
- Length: 2.5 mi (4.0 km)

North Carolina Highway 308 Truck (NC 308 Truck) is a 2.5-mile (4.0 km) route that bypasses southeast of downtown Windsor. It overlaps at first with US 13 and US 17, then with US 17 Business.

The entire route is in Windsor, Bertie County.

mi	km	Destinations	Notes
0.0	0.0	US 13 north / US 17 north / NC 308 – Ahoskie	North end of US 13/US 17 overlap
1.5	2.4	US 13 south / US 17 south / US 13 Bus. / US 17 Bus. – Williamston	South end of both US 13/US 17 and US 13/US 17 business overlap
1.7	2.7	US 13 Bus. north (Granville Street)	North end of US 13 Bus. overlap
2.5	4.0	US 17 Bus. north / NC 308 (King Street)	North end of US 17 Bus. overlap
1.000 mi = 1.609 km; 1.000 km = 0.621 mi: Concurrency terminus
