= U.S. Route 17 in North Carolina =

Highway in North Carolina

U.S. Highway 17
- Coastal Highway
- US 17 highlighted in red

Route information
- Maintained by NCDOT
- Length: 286.0 mi (460.3 km)
- Existed: 1927–present

Major junctions
- South end: US 17 at the South Carolina state line in Carolina Shores
- I-140 near Winnabow; US 74 / US 76 / US 421 / NC 133 in Leland; US 117 / NC 132 in Wilmington; NC 140 in Kirkland; US 70 near New Bern; US 264 in Washington; US 13 / US 64 in Williamston; US 158 in Elizabeth City
- North end: US 17 at the Virginia state line near Chesapeake, VA

Location
- Country: United States
- State: North Carolina
- Counties: Brunswick, New Hanover, Pender, Onslow, Jones, Craven, Beaufort, Martin, Bertie, Chowan, Perquimans, Pasquotank, Camden

Highway system
- United States Numbered Highway System; List; Special; Divided; North Carolina Highway System; Interstate; US; State; Scenic
← NC 16	→ NC 18

U.S. Highway 17 (US 17) in the U.S. state of North Carolina is a north–south highway that is known as the Coastal Highway in the southeastern half of the state and the Ocean Highway in other areas. The route enters the state from South Carolina near Calabash and leaves in the vicinity of the Great Dismal Swamp National Wildlife Refuge in Virginia. Between the US 64 freeway and the Virginia state line, US 17 is a four-lane divided highway with speed limits varying between 45 mph (72 km/h) and 70 mph (110 km/h).

== Route description ==
US 17 enters Brunswick County in Carolina Shores amid a variety of golf course communities. Carolina Shores was part of Calabash until 1998.

In Wilmington, US 17 (here concurrent with US 76 and US 421) crosses the Cape Fear River between New Hanover and Brunswick counties over the Cape Fear Memorial Bridge. US 17 then travels east through the city of Wilmington with US 76 on Wooster/Dawson streets and Oleander Drive, intersecting US 117, North Carolina Highway 132 (NC 132), and US 74. At the end of the US 76 concurrency near Wrightsville Beach, US 17 travels north as Military Cutoff Road before meeting up with Market Street and US 17 Business (US 17 Bus.) and exiting the city northeast. North of Holly Ridge, US 17 begins to move further away from the Atlantic Coast. Then, it bypasses Jacksonville along with NC 24. Between New Bern and James City, US 17 (concurrent with US 70 and NC 55) crosses the Trent River by way of the Freedom Memorial Bridge. Farther east, between James City and Bridgeton, US 17, still concurrent with NC 55, crosses the Neuse River over the Neuse River Bridge. Traffic going north on US 17 when using US 70's concurrency can bypass New Bern altogether via NC 43, ironically both the west end of US 17's concurrency on US 70 and NC 43's southern terminus both, respectively have a north and south protrusion of unused highway since full cloverleaf junctions were scrapped in the area.

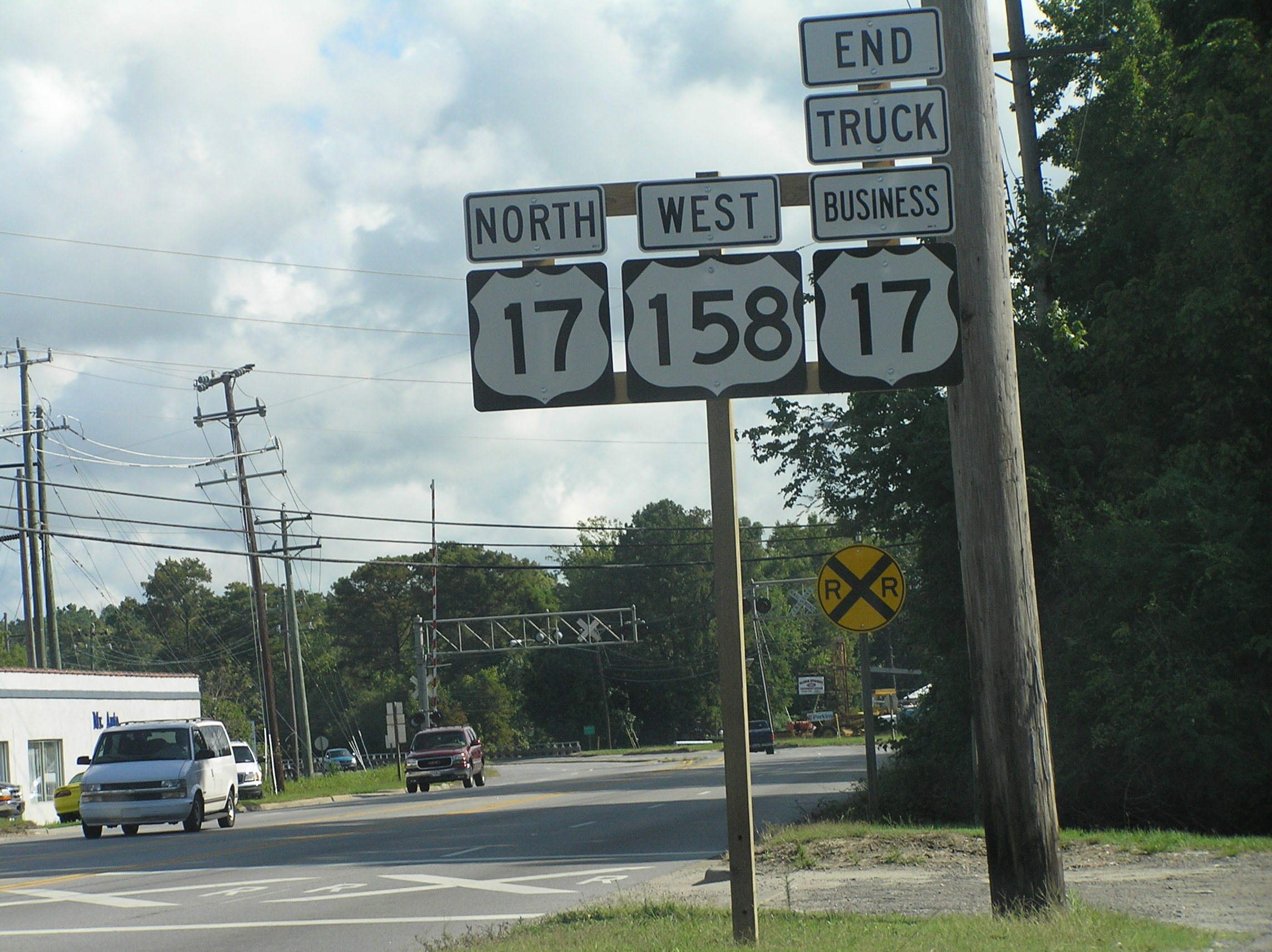
US 17 northbound/US 158 westbound past the northern terminus of US 17 Bus. and US 17 Bus. Truck in Elizabeth City

US 17 enters into Washington as it splits into its business route and mainline freeway bypass, crossing the Pamlico River over the Pamlico–Tar River Bridge on both stretches, shortly before the route intersects with US 264. Farther along in Bear Grass, US 17 joins a concurrency with a limited-access portion of US 13/US 64, although US 64 moves east before US 13/US 17 reaches Williamston, where the limited-access segment ends. US 13/US 17 uses the Roanoke River Bridge to cross the Roanoke River, then, before US 13 moves onto the interchange with North King Street, it crosses the Cashie River Bridge over the Cashie River at Windsor. At the Bertie–Chowan county line, US 17 traverses the Chowan River from Edenhouse to Edenton. East of Edenton, US 17 shares a concurrency with NC 37 until they reach Hertford where it branches off to the northwest onto US 17 Bus. US 17 crosses the Perquimans River via the Perquimans River Bridge. Between Perquimans and Pasquotank counties, US 17 crosses the Little River over the Little River Bridge. A bypass route splits off to the northwest as US 17 (Mainline) continues into Elizabeth City as Hughes Boulevard, picking up concurrency with US 158 until US 158 splits off to the west at Morgan's Corner. US 17 crosses the Pasquotank River between Morgan's Corner in Pasquotank County and South Mills in Camden County, before entering Virginia adjacent to the Great Dismal Swamp National Wildlife Refuge.

== History ==
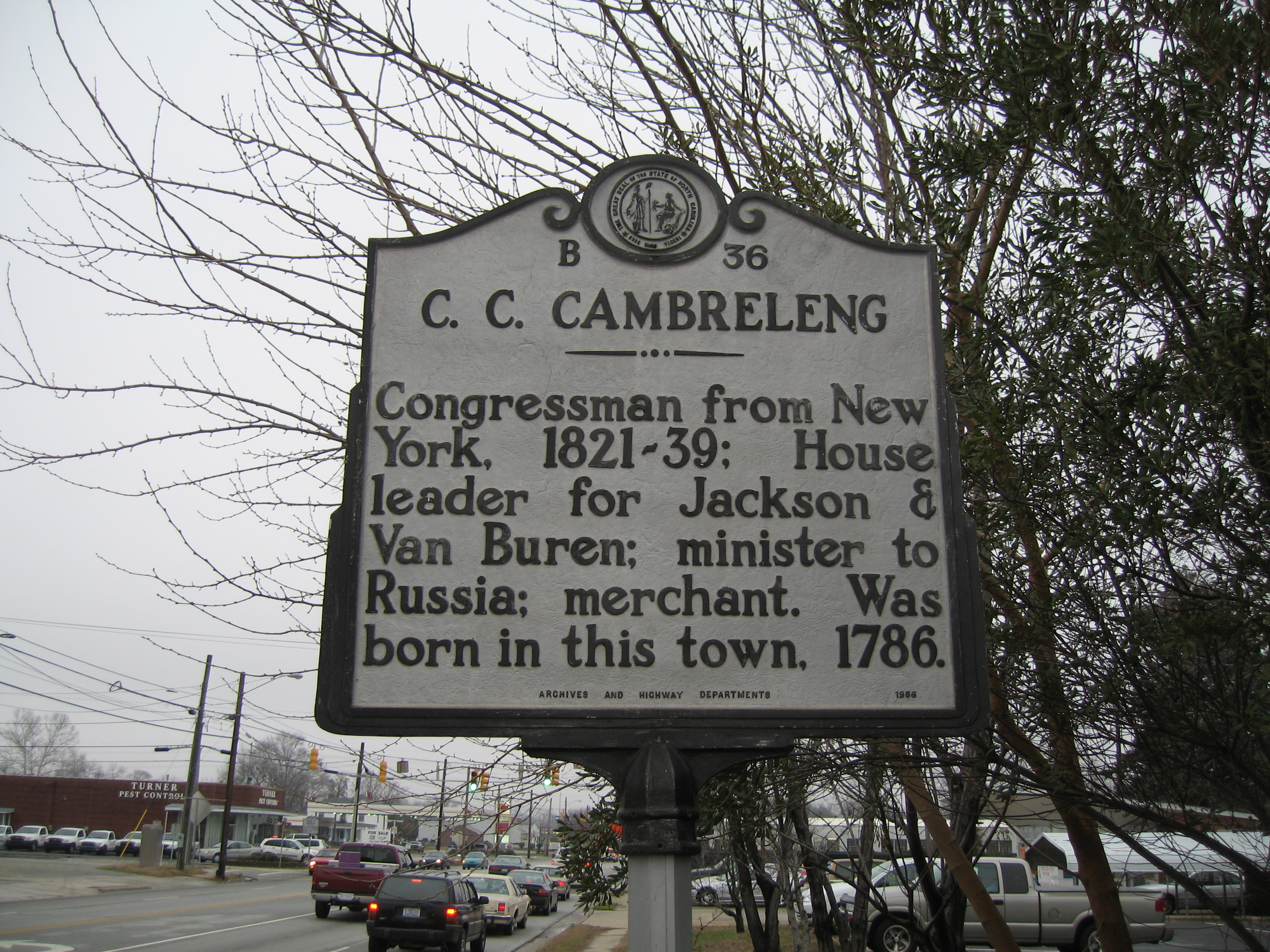
Historical Marker along US 17

US 17 was established in 1927, traversing from South Carolina, near Fair Bluff, to Virginia, near South Mills. Its routing was placed along the following state highways: NC 202, from the South Carolina state line to Chadbourn; NC 20, from Chadbourn to Wilmington; NC 30, from Wilmington to Windsor; NC 342, from Windsor to Elizabeth City; NC 34, from Elizabeth City to Morgan's Corner; and NC 341, from Morgans Corner to the Virginia state line.

In May 2015, the American Association of State Highway and Transportation Officials (AASHTO) approved a request to reroute US 17 back through Wilmington, following US 76 along Oleander Drive and Military Cutoff Road. The justification for the route change was to better serve industry and commerce. In May 2017, US 17 was officially rerouted through Wilmington, ending its northern bypass route.

=== Interstate proposals ===
As a major north–south corridor through the coastal area, US 17 has been the target of various Interstate Highway proposals over the years. The earliest known proposal was in 1964, with a proposal supported by then-Governor Terry Sanford, to build a new Interstate from Fayetteville to Norfolk, Virginia, via US 13 and US 17. Designated Interstate 13 (I-13), it received support from various local officials but was not supported by the North Carolina Highway Commission, which ended discussions.

During the mid-1990s through mid-2000s, I-99 was proposed between Charleston, South Carolina, and Wilmington, Delaware, completely overlapping all of US 17 in North Carolina. In 2006, the Virginia Department of Transportation (VDOT) completed a study on the feasibility of the Interstate and concluded with the high cost and disinterest of other states, notably South Carolina, that it was not feasible and recommend to not pursue further.

In 2012, the North Carolina Department of Transportation (NCDOT) backed and presented a letter to the Federal Highway Administration (FHWA) requesting the establishment of a new high priority corridor between Raleigh and Norfolk, designated I-44 (or I-50, with I-56 and I-89 as other possible numbers). This corridor follows US 64 and US 17, north of Williamston. The following year, I-495 was established east of Raleigh and was routed on part of this proposed route. In 2014, various supporters, including Governor Pat McCrory, Representative G. K. Butterfield, NCDOT, and the Regional Transportation Alliance (RTA), made cases and written letters to federal officials in support of the new Interstate corridor. In 2016, AASHTO approved designation of I-87 along US 17 between Williamston and the Virginia state line.

=== North Carolina Highway 341 ===
North Carolina Highway 341
- Location: Morgan's Corner–Virginia state line
- Length: 10.4 mi (16.7 km)
- Existed: 1921–1934

North Carolina Highway 341 (NC 341) was an original state highway that traversed from NC 34, in Morgan's Corner, to South Mills. In 1923, it was extended north to the Virginia state line, meeting up with SR 40. In 1927, it was completely overlapped with US 17, which subsequently replaced it outright in 1934.

== Future ==
In Chowan County, the existing freeway section of US 17, which bypasses Edenton, will be fully upgraded to modern Interstate standards. At a cost of $13 million, it will mainly focus on widening travel lanes and building shoulders; construction is planned to start in 2025.

== Junction list ==
County	Location	mi	km	Exit	Destinations	Notes
Brunswick	Carolina Shores	0.0	0.0		US 17 south – Myrtle Beach	South Carolina state line
Brunswick					I-74 (Carolina Bays Parkway)	Proposed interchange (unfunded)
Brunswick	Grissettown	6.9	11.1		NC 904 – Ocean Isle Beach, Tabor City	
Brunswick	Shallotte	11.9	19.2		US 17 Bus. north – Shallotte	
Brunswick	Shallotte	13.2	21.2		NC 130 – Shallotte, Whiteville	
Brunswick	Shallotte	16.0	25.7		US 17 Bus. south – Shallotte	
Brunswick	Supply	21.6	34.8		NC 211 – Bolton, St. James, Southport	
Brunswick		23.6	38.0		US 17 Bus. north (Old Ocean Highway) – Bolivia	Superstreet intersection
Brunswick		28.6	46.0		NC 906 south (Galloway Road) – Oak Island	Northern terminus of NC 906
Brunswick	Bolivia	30.5	49.1		US 17 Bus. south (Old Ocean Highway) – Bolivia	
Brunswick	Winnabow	35.0	56.3		NC 87 south – Boiling Spring Lakes, Southport	South end of NC 87 overlap
Brunswick		38.3	61.6		NC 87 north – Elizabethtown	North end of NC 87 overlap, superstreet intersection
Brunswick		39.2	63.1	39	I-140 east – Topsail Island, Jacksonville, New Bern	I-140 exit 1
Brunswick	Leland	44.0	70.8		US 74 / US 76 west – Whiteville	West end of US 74/US 76 overlap; south end of freeway section
Brunswick	Leland	45.0	72.4		NC 133 south – Belville, Southport, Oak Island	West end of NC 133 overlap
Brunswick		47.0	75.6		US 74 east / US 421 / NC 133 north – Wrightsville Beach, Battleship NC, Clinton	East end of US 74 and north end of US 421/NC 133 overlap
New Hanover	Cape Fear River			Cape Fear Memorial Bridge		
New Hanover	Wilmington				State Port ( US 421 Truck south)	Eastbound exit and westbound entrance; north end of freeway section
New Hanover	Wilmington				US 421 south / US 17 Bus. north (3rd Street) – Carolina Beach, Kure Beach, Downtown Wilmington	South end of US 421 overlap; to North Carolina Aquarium and Fort Fisher State Park
New Hanover	Wilmington				US 117 / NC 132 (College Road) to I-40 – Carolina Beach, UNC Wilmington	Interchange; to the North Carolina State Ports Authority
New Hanover	Wilmington				US 74 / US 76 east (Eastwood Road) – Wrightsville Beach	East end of US 76 overlap
New Hanover	Wilmington				US 17 Bus. south (Market Street) – Downtown Wilmington	
New Hanover	Wilmington				NC 417 north (Military Cutoff Road)	Opened on September 28, 2023; Future US 17 Bypass
New Hanover	Kirkland				NC 140 west to I-140 / I-40 – Raleigh	
Pender	Hampstead	69.1	111.2		NC 210 west – Rocky Point	West end of NC 210 overlap
Pender		77.7	125.0		NC 210 east – Surf City, Topsail Beach	East end of NC 210 overlap
Onslow	Holly Ridge	81.9	131.8		NC 50 (Ocean Road) – Surf City, Maple Hill	
Onslow	Folkstone	86.3	138.9		NC 172 north (Sneads Ferry Road) – Sneads Ferry	Southern terminus of NC 172
Onslow	Dixon	89.9	144.7		NC 210 west (Rifle Range Road) – Topsail Beach, Sneads Ferry	Southern terminus of NC 210
Onslow	Jacksonville	101.2	162.9	105	US 17 Bus. north – Jacksonville	South end of freeway section; northbound left exit and southbound entrance
Onslow	Jacksonville	101.6	163.5	105	NC 24 west to US 258 – Richlands, Kinston	West end of NC 24 overlap; southbound access to US 17 Bus. northbound
Onslow	Jacksonville	104.6	168.3		Montford Point Road	Northbound exit and southbound entrance
Onslow	Jacksonville	105.0	169.0	109	NC 24 east / NC 24 Bus. west – Camp Lejeune, Morehead City	East end of NC 24 overlap
Onslow	Jacksonville	106.4	171.2	110	West Huff Drive	
Onslow	Jacksonville	107.2	172.5	111	US 17 Bus. south to US 258 / Jacksonville Parkway – Jacksonville (Downtown)	North end of freeway section; no exit number southbound
Jones	Maysville	120.5	193.9		NC 58 south – Cape Cateret, Emerald Isle	South end of NC 58 overlap
Jones	Pollocksville	127.5	205.2	130	NC 58 north – Trenton	North end of NC 58 overlap
Jones		132.7	213.6	136	US 17 Bus. north – New Bern	At-grade intersection; south end of expressway section
Craven		132.8	213.7	141B	US 70 west – Kinston	South end of US 70 overlap; left entrance northbound, left exits; US 70 exit 410A
Craven		139.1	223.9	411	NC 43 north – Greenville, Vanceboro	Southern terminus of NC 43; exit numbers follow US 70
Craven	New Bern	141.3	227.4		Glenburnie Road – Craven Community College	
Craven	New Bern	142.3	229.0	414	US 17 Bus. – New Bern, Jacksonville	
Craven	New Bern	143.9	231.6	416	NC 55 west (Pembroke Road) – Trent Woods	West end of NC 55 overlap
Craven	James City	145.1	233.5	417	US 70 east / East Front Street ( US 17 Bus. south) – New Bern, Havelock, Morehead City	Signed as exits 417A (Front St.) and 417B (US 70); east end of US 70 overlap; exit to US 70 east not numbered northbound; US 70 west exit 417B
Craven	Bridgeton	147.8	237.9		NC 55 east – Bayboro	East end of NC 55 overlap
Craven	Emul	158.2	254.6		NC 43 south (Weyerhaeuser Road) – New Bern	South end of NC 43 overlap
Craven	Vanceboro	161.7	260.2		US 17 Bus. / NC 43 north – Vanceboro, Greenville	North end of NC 43 overlap
Craven	Vanceboro	165.1	265.7		US 17 Bus. south – Vanceboro	
Beaufort		172.0	276.8		NC 102 west – Ayden	Eastern terminus of NC 102
Beaufort		177.1	285.0		US 17 Bus. north – Chocowinity	Superstreet intersection, south end of freeway
Beaufort	Chocowinity	177.9	286.3	176	NC 33 – Chocowinity, Greenville	Folded Diamond Interchange
Beaufort	Washington	181.9	292.7	180	US 264 – Washington, Greenville	
Beaufort	Washington	182.7	294.0		US 17 Bus. south (Carolina Avenue) – Washington	Superstreet intersection; north end of freeway
Beaufort	Old Ford	187.2	301.3		NC 171 north – Jamesville	Southern terminus of NC 171
Martin	Williamston	200.5	322.7	514	US 13 south / US 64 west / US 17 Bus. north – Williamston, Tarboro	South end of US 13 and west end of US 64 overlap
Martin	Williamston	202.0	325.1	515	US 64 east – Plymouth, Manteo	East end of US 64 overlap; southbound access via US 64 Alt.
Martin	Williamston	202.2	325.4		US 64 Alt. (Jamesville Road) to US 64 east	
Martin	Williamston	203.4	327.3		US 17 Bus. south (Main Street)	
Bertie	Windsor	214.6	345.4		US 13 north / US 17 Byp. north – Ahoskie, Edenton	North end of US 13 and south end of US 13 Bus overlap
Bertie	Windsor	214.7	345.5		US 13 Bus. north (Granville Street)	North end of US 13 Bus overlap
Bertie	Windsor	215.6	347.0		NC 308 west (King Street)	West end of NC 308 overlap
Bertie	Windsor	216.8	348.9		NC 308 east (Cooper Hill Road)	East end of NC 308 overlap
Bertie		222.5	358.1		US 17 Byp. south – Williamston	
Bertie	Midway	225.9	363.6		NC 45 – Plymouth, Colerain	
Bertie	Chowan River			Eden House Bridge; south end of expressway		
Chowan		232.9	374.8	224	US 17 Bus. north (Queen Street) – Edenton	
Chowan	Edenton	235.0	378.2	226	Dr. Martin Luther King Jr. Avenue	
Chowan	Edenton	236.1	380.0	227	NC 32 (Virginia Road) – Edenton	
Chowan	Edenton	237.2	381.7	228	Paradise Road	
Chowan		238.7	384.2	230	US 17 Bus. south (Broad Street) – Edenton	North end of expressway
Perquimans		240.9	387.7		NC 37 south – Plymouth, Columbia	South end of NC 37 overlap
Perquimans	Hertford	246.8	397.2		US 17 Bus. north – Hertford	
Perquimans	Winfall	250.0	402.3		US 17 Bus. south / NC 37 north – Hertford	North end of NC 37 overlap
Pasquotank	Rabbit Corner	257.9	415.0	254	Okisko Road	South end of freeway section
Pasquotank		258.5	416.0	255	US 17 Byp. north – Chesapeake VA	North end of freeway section; northbound exit and southbound entrance
Pasquotank	Elizabeth City	263.2	423.6		US 17 Bus. north (Ehringhaus Street) – Elizabeth City	
Pasquotank	Elizabeth City	263.6	424.2		NC 344 (Halstead Boulevard) – Weeksville	
Pasquotank	Elizabeth City	264.7	426.0		US 158 east (Elizabeth Street) – Camden, Outer Banks	East end of US 158 overlap
Pasquotank	Elizabeth City	265.6	427.4		US 17 Bus. south (Road Street south)	
Pasquotank		272.9	439.2	264	US 17 Byp. south to US 158 – Hertford, Edenton	Partial interchange; at-grade access to southbound/from northbound, left exit southbound, left entrance northbound; US 17 Byp. exit 264
Pasquotank	Morgans Corner	276.0	444.2		US 158 west – Sunbury	West end of US 158 overlap
Camden	South Mills	277.4	446.4		US 17 Bus. north – South Mills, Nags Head	
Camden		279.8	450.3		US 17 Bus. south / NC 343 – South Mills, Camden	
Camden		286.0	460.3		US 17 north – Chesapeake	Virginia state line
1.000 mi = 1.609 km; 1.000 km = 0.621 mi: Concurrency terminus; Incomplete access; Unopened

== Special routes ==
There are numerous existing and former special routes of US 17 within the state of North Carolina.

== See also ==
- North Carolina Bicycle Route 3: Concurrent with US 17 at multiple locations
- North Carolina Bicycle Route 5: Concurrent with US 17 on its NC 133 concurrency

U.S. Route 17
Previous state: South Carolina	North Carolina	Next state: Virginia
