= Special routes of U.S. Route 17 =

United States Numbered Highway System

Special routes of U.S. Route 17

Highway system
- United States Numbered Highway System; List; Special; Divided

A total of at least 32 special routes of U.S. Route 17 (US 17) have existed: 3 in Florida, 6 in South Carolina, 17 in North Carolina, and 6 in Virginia.

== Florida ==
=== Kissimmee truck route ===
U.S. Highway 17 Truck
- Location: Kissimmee, Florida
- Existed: 2011–present

U.S. Highway 17 Truck (US 17 Truck) is an alternate route for US 17/US 92 in northern Kissimmee, Florida, following State Road 423 (SR 423; John Young Parkway) and the Osceola Parkway (County Road 522, or CR 522) instead of Vine Street (US 192) and the Orange Blossom Trail (OBT). It was signed in about 2011 when the single-point urban interchange at the John Young and Osceola parkways was completed.

Until 1999, a truck bypass was signed around downtown Kissimmee. It began where US 17/US 92 formerly turned from John Young Parkway onto West Emmett Street and continued north in a straight line along John Young Parkway to US 192, where it turned east until it returned to US 17/US 92 at North Main Street (OBT). The route existed from sometime during the 1980s until 1999, when US 17/US 92 itself was rerouted to bypass downtown Kissimmee.

=== Maitland truck route ===
U.S. Highway 17 Truck
- Location: Winter Park–Maitland, Florida

U.S. Highway 17 Truck (US 17 Truck) is designated to divert overheight truck traffic away from a low railroad bridge that carries the SunRail rail line over US 17/US 92 in southern Maitland, Florida. The route follows SR 423 (Lee Road), Interstate 4 (I-4), and SR 414 (Maitland Boulevard) in Winter Park and Maitland. It formerly used Wymore Road and Lake Avenue (CR 438A) instead of I-4 and SR 414.

=== Jacksonville alternate route ===
U.S. Highway 17 Alternate
- Location: Jacksonville, Florida
- Length: 1.1 mi (1.8 km)
- Existed: c. 1960s–2007

The Roosevelt Expressway is a spur of I-10 (SR 8) west of downtown Jacksonville, in the U.S. state of Florida, built partially to freeway standards. It travels northeast from an intersection with Roosevelt Boulevard (US 17/SR 15), traveling parallel with nearby McDuff Avenue (SR 129), to a partial interchange with I-10.

The road is designated as a spur of SR 15 and was formerly numbered SR 15A. It has also been—and may still be—an unsigned U.S. Highway 17 Alternate (US 17 Alt.), which originally continued east on I-10 and north on I-95 to return to US 17 north of the Trout River.

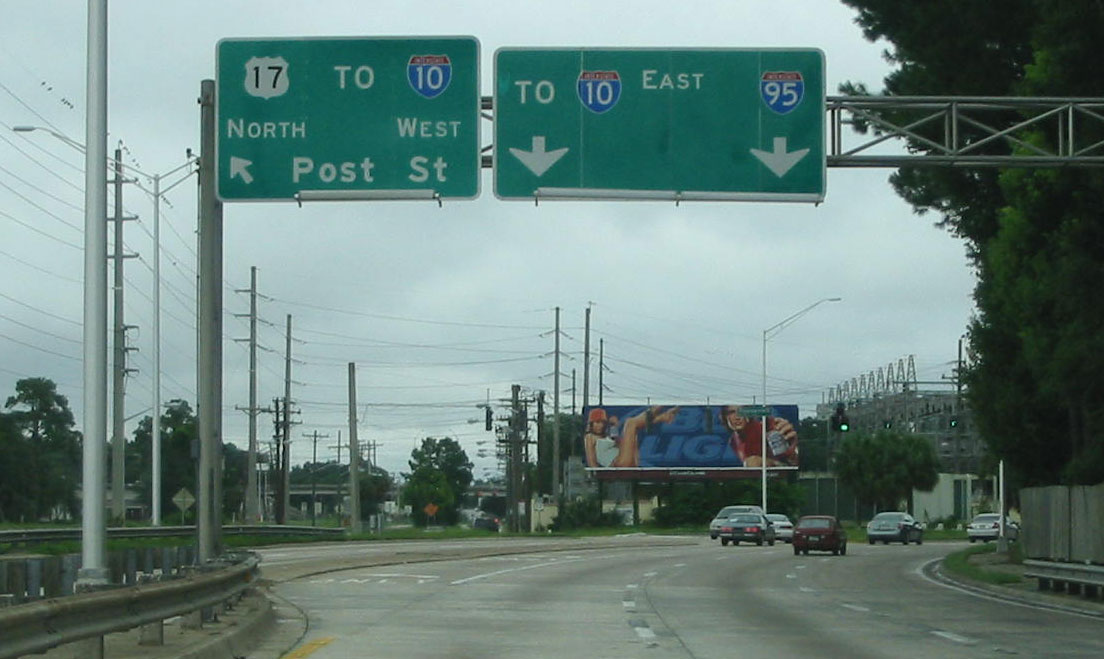
US 17 north at the interchange with the Roosevelt Expressway

Roosevelt Expressway is the bypass built as a spur of I-10, which converted US 17 into a limited-access expressway north of Blanding Boulevard (SR 21), bypassing the Post Street/College Street route that Roosevelt Boulevard used to travel through the Riverside and Avondale historic district, passing by McDuff Avenue (SR 129) to I-10 eastbound. The expressway is accessible southbound via I-10 west as a left exit (exit 361).

The current design was preferred over the proposed River Oaks Freeway, which would have decimated the Avondale district. The partial interchanges with Blanding and I-10 reflect the nature of the original need of a bypass system. Intended to stimulate commerce and encourage connectivity to Jacksonville's downtown to and from the suburbs and Orange Park, while streamlining commutes and lessening the impact such travel was to potentially have on Jacksonville's oldest areas in the southwest side of town by removing high volume and chaotic redevelopment from the streets of Avondale and Lakeside Park, the area east of the Roosevelt Expressway is now protected in the form of a zoning overlay largely allowed by the basic design of this alternate route. Roosevelt Expressway has been signed in the last number of years as Roosevelt Boulevard, even though it's still in the Jacksonville Transportation Authority books as Expressway. It is part of the Blue Star Memorial Highway and named for President Franklin D. Roosevelt.

In early 2006, the Florida Department of Transportation applied to the American Association of State Highway and Transportation Officials (AASHTO) to reroute US 17 via the Roosevelt Expressway, I-10, I-95, and US 23. If this is accepted, US 17 Alt. will be eliminated. As of March 2007, it appears that US 17 has been rerouted. US 17 goes north on the Roosevelt Expressway, to east I-10 (SR 8), north on I-95, and east on Union Street (US 23) until Main Street and picking back up on its original course.

== Georgia ==
=== Savannah alternate route ===
U.S. Highway 17 Alternate
- Location: Savannah, Georgia
- Existed: 1951–1953

U.S. Highway 17 Alternate (US 17 Alt.) was an alternate route of US 17 that existed entirely within the city limits of Savannah, Georgia. The roadway that would eventually become US 17 Alt. was established between November 1946 and February 1948 as State Route 25 Spur (SR 25 Spur), from US 17/SR 25 on the western edge of the city to US 17/US 80/SR 25/SR 26 in the main part. Between April 1949 and August 1950, it was then indicated to have started at US 17/SR 25 (Ogeechee Road), traveled east-southeast on 52nd Street, turned left on Whatley Avenue and traveled to the northeast, curved to the north-northeast onto Montgomery Street and traveled north-northeast to its northern terminus. By the beginning of 1952, US 17 Alt. was established on the path of SR 25 Spur from US 17/SR 25 east-southeast on Mills B. Lane Boulevard, northeast on Whatley Avenue, and north-northeast on Montgomery Street, as previously. In 1953, the path of US 17 Alt. on SR 25 Spur was redesignated as the northbound lanes of US 17.

Major intersections

The entire route was in Savannah, Chatham County.

mi	km	Destinations	Notes
		US 17 / SR 25 (Ogeechee Road) / SR 25 Spur begins	Southern terminus; south end of SR 25 Spur concurrency
		US 17 / US 80 / SR 25 / SR 26 (37th Street / Montgomery Street) / SR 25 Spur ends	Northern terminus; north end of SR 25 Spur concurrency
1.000 mi = 1.609 km; 1.000 km = 0.621 mi: Concurrency terminus

=== Georgia–South Carolina alternate route ===
U.S. Highway 17 Alternate
- Location: Savannah, Georgia–Limehouse, South Carolina
- Existed: 1955–1991

U.S. Highway 17 Alternate (US 17 Alt.) was an alternate route of US 17 that existed in Savannah, Georgia, and the southern part of South Carolina. It was concurrent with SR 25 Alt. for its entire length in Georgia. Between June 1954 and June 1955, US 17 Alt. and SR 25 Alt. were established from an intersection with the southbound lanes of US 17/SR 25 (Ogeechee Road), north-northeast on Stiles Avenue, right onto Gwinnett Street to the east-southeast, and left onto Boundary Street to the north-northeast. The highways reached the South Carolina state line, where SR 25 Alt. reached its northern terminus. US 17 Alt. crossed over the Savannah River on a toll bridge. It curved to the northwest and reached its northern terminus, another intersection with US 17. In 1985, US 17 Alt./SR 25 Alt. was rerouted to begin at an interchange with I-516/US 17/US 80/SR 21/SR 25/SR 26. It traveled east-southeast on Bay Street, turned right onto West Broad Street, traveled to the south-southwest, turned right onto York Street, traveled to the west-northwest, and turned right onto Boundary Street to continue as before. In 1991, the path of US 17 Alt./SR 25 Alt. was redesignated as SR 25 Connector (SR 25 Conn.).

Major intersections

This table shows the 1985–1991 intersections.

State	County	Location	mi	km	Destinations	Notes
Georgia	Chatham	Savannah			I-516 / US 17 / US 80 / SR 21 / SR 25 / SR 26 / SR 25 Alt. begins	Southern terminus of US 17 Alt. and SR 25 Alt.; south end of SR 25 Alt. concurrency
Georgia	Chatham	Savannah			SR 404 Spur south	Future SR 404 Spur south
Savannah River					Georgia–South Carolina state line; northern terminus of SR 25 Alt.; north end of SR 25 Alt. concurrency	
South Carolina	Jasper				US 17	Northern terminus
1.000 mi = 1.609 km; 1.000 km = 0.621 mi: Concurrency terminus

=== Ridgeland alternate route ===
U.S. Highway 17 Alternate
- Location: Ridgeland, South Carolina

== South Carolina ==
=== South Carolina alternate route ===
U.S. Highway 17 Alternate
- Location: Near Pocotaligo–Georgetown, South Carolina
- Length: 123.4 mi (198.6 km)
- Existed: 1952–present

U.S. Highway 17 Alternate (US 17 Alt.) is an alternate route of US 17 in South Carolina that runs between Pocotaligo and Georgetown. It is 123.4 miles (198.6 km) long and has been four-laned in various segments since 1970.

=== Yemassee alternate route ===
U.S. Highway 17 Alternate
- Location: Yemassee, South Carolina

=== Yemassee connector route ===
U.S. Highway 17 Connector
- Flowers Street
- Location: Yemassee, South Carolina
- Length: 0.270 mi (435 m)

U.S. Highway 17 Connector (US 17 Conn.) is a connector route within the city limits of Yemassee, South Carolina. It connects Yemassee Highway with US 17 Alt./US 21 and to the eastern terminus of South Carolina Highway 68 (SC 68; Connelly Street). It is known as Flowers Street and is an unsigned highway.

=== Rantowles–Parkers Ferry alternate route ===
U.S. Highway 17 Alternate
- Location: Rantowles–Parkers Ferry, South Carolina

=== Ridgeville alternate route ===
U.S. Highway 17 Alternate
- Location: Ridgeville, South Carolina

=== Summerville alternate truck route ===
U.S. Highway 17 Alternate Truck
- Location: Summerville, South Carolina
- Length: 8.242 mi (13.264 km)

U.S. Highway 17 Alternate Truck (US 17 Alt. Truck) is an 8.242-mile (13.264 km) truck route of US 17 Alt. that is mostly within the city limits of Summerville, South Carolina. It uses SC 642 and SC 165.

=== Charleston alternate route ===
U.S. Highway 17 Alternate
- Location: Charleston, South Carolina

=== Mount Pleasant business loop ===
U.S. Highway 17 Business
- Location: Mount Pleasant, South Carolina
- Existed: 1967–1992

U.S. Highway 17 Business (US 17 Bus.) in Mount Pleasant, South Carolina, ran in an overlap with US 701 Bus. along part of SC 703 and all of I-526 Bus. from 1967 to 1992.

=== Myrtle Beach alternate route ===
U.S. Highway 17 Alternate
- Location: Myrtle Beach, South Carolina
- Existed: 1940–1947

=== Murrells Inlet–Garden City connector route ===
U.S. Highway 17 Connector
- Location: Murrells Inlet–Garden City, South Carolina
- Length: 0.600 mi (966 m)

U.S. Highway 17 Connector (US 17 Conn.) is a 0.600-mile (0.966 km) connector route between US 17 and US 17 Bus. on the Murrells Inlet–Garden City line in South Carolina. A former routing of US 17, it is unnamed and is an unsigned highway; the northbound side is signed for the business route instead.

=== Myrtle Beach business loop ===
U.S. Highway 17 Business
- Kings Highway
- Location: Myrtle Beach, South Carolina
- Length: 22.940 mi (36.918 km)
- Existed: 1967–present

U.S. Highway 17 Business (US 17 Bus.), also known as Kings Highway, was established by 1967 when mainline US 17 was bypassed west of Murrells Inlet, South Carolina. In 1981, it was extended north to near Briarcliffe Acres, after mainline US 17 was placed on a new highway bypass route. The 22.940-mile (36.918 km) business route connects: Murrells Inlet, Garden City, Surfside Beach, and Myrtle Beach. The highway is also a major route during the Marathon weekend; miles 2 to 6 and also 19 to 21 run through this highway during the marathon.

=== Murrells Inlet bypass route ===
U.S. Highway 17 Bypass
- Location: Murrells Inlet, South Carolina
- Existed: c. 1966–c. 1981

== North Carolina ==
=== Shallotte business loop ===
U.S. Highway 17 Business
- Location: Shallotte, North Carolina
- Length: 3.79 mi (6.10 km)
- Existed: 1991–present

U.S. Highway 17 Business (US 17 Bus.) was established in 1991 after the completion of the Shallotte Bypass around Shallotte, North Carolina. The business loop is 3.8 miles (6.1 km) in length and has the street name Main Street for its entire length. The middle segment is also concurrent with North Carolina Highway 130 (NC 130), which splits from US 17 Bus. in the north to travel to Whiteville and splits in the south to travel to Holden Beach.

Major intersections

The entire route is in Shallotte, Brunswick County.

mi	km	Destinations	Notes
0.0	0.0	US 17 – Myrtle Beach, Wilmington	
1.7	2.7	NC 130 west / NC 179 south (Whiteville Road) – Whiteville, Ocean Isle Beach	West end of NC 130 overlap
2.8	4.5	NC 130 east (Smith Avenue) / NC 130 Bus. west – Holden Beach	East end of NC 130 and west end of NC 130 Bus overlap
3.1	5.0	NC 130 Bus. east (Holden Beach Road) – Holden Beach	East end of NC 130 Bus overlap
3.8	6.1	US 17 – Wilmington, Myrtle Beach	
1.000 mi = 1.609 km; 1.000 km = 0.621 mi: Concurrency terminus

=== Bolivia business loop ===
U.S. Highway 17 Business
- Location: Bolivia, North Carolina
- Length: 7.5 mi (12.1 km)
- Existed: 1992–present

U.S. Highway 17 Business (US 17 Bus.) was established in 1992 after the completion of the Bolivia Bypass around Bolivia, North Carolina. The business route follows the old alignment of US 17 through Bolivia, the small county seat of Brunswick County. This 7.5-mile (12.1 km) route is also called the Old Ocean Highway and passes through the center of Bolivia near its northern terminus.

Major intersections

The entire route is in Brunswick County.

Location	mi	km	Destinations	Notes
	0.0	0.0	US 17 – Shallotte, Leland, Wilmington	Superstreet intersection, u-turn for US 17 south
	5.8	9.3	NC 906 south – Oak Island	South end of NC 906 overlap
	5.9	9.5	NC 906 north	North end of NC 906 overlap
Bolivia	7.5	12.1	US 17 – Leland, Wilmington, Shallotte	
1.000 mi = 1.609 km; 1.000 km = 0.621 mi: Concurrency terminus

=== U.S. Route 17-1 ===
U.S. Route 17-1
- Location: Wilmington, North Carolina–Petersburg, Virginia
- Length: 236.3 mi (380.3 km)
- Existed: 1926–1932

U.S. Route 17-1 (US 17-1) was an original U.S. highway, established in 1926; in North Carolina, it was overlapped completely on NC 40. It starts, in Wilmington, on 5th Street at Market Street (US 17/NC 20), where it goes north to Nixon Street, then east to McRae Street and proceeds north on Castle Haynes Road. At Wallace, it follows today's NC 11 to Kenansville, then west, via today NC 24 Bus./NC 50, to Warsaw. Continuing north, it goes through Faison, Mount Olive, and through Goldsboro on George Street. Continuing north through Wilson, via Goldsboro Street and Herring Avenue, it connects Elm City, Rocky Mount, Battleboro, Halifax, and finally Weldon, via Washington and Sycamore avenues. Entering Virginia, it connects through Emporia before reaching Petersburg, via Sycamore Street, ending at Washington Street (US 1).

In 1932, the entire route was renumbered, with most of the Wilmington–Wilson route to US 117 and all of Wilson–Petersburg route to US 301. Today, the entire route is paralleled with I-40 and I-95.

=== Wilmington business loop ===
U.S. Highway 17 Business
- Location: Wilmington, North Carolina
- Length: 8.1 mi (13.0 km)
- Existed: 1971–present

U.S. Highway 17 Business (US 17 Bus.) is an 8.1-mile (13.0 km) business route of US 17 through Wilmington, North Carolina. While physically running in a primarily east–west pattern, US 17 Bus. is signed as north–south, coherent with its parent route. Its southern terminus is located at an at-grade intersection between Third Street, Dawson Street, and the eastbound ramp of the Cape Fear Memorial Bridge which carries US 17, US 76, and US 421. From its terminus, US 17 Bus. continues north along Third Street for 450 feet (140 m), intersecting Wooster Street and the westbound ramp of the Cape Fear Memorial Bridge. US 17 Bus. continues north along Third Street through a residential area of downtown Wilmington. At Market Street, US 17 Bus. turns to the east, following the street out of downtown Wilmington. Leaving downtown Wilmington along Market Street, US 17 Bus. passes several historical sites including the Bellamy Mansion and First Baptist Church. Two pieces of artwork exist within the median of Market Street, including a monument to Cornelius Harnett at Fourth Street and a fountain located within the intersection with Fifth Street. The George Davis Monument formerly stood in the median of Market Street at the Third Street intersection but was dismantled in 2020. The median along Market Street ends at 16th Street and US 17 Bus. passes through Market Street Mansion District which is listed on the National Register of Historic Places. US 17 Bus. continues to travel through residential areas of Wilmington until intersecting Covil Avenue, where some commercial business are located adjacent to the highway. By Kerr Avenue, the adjacent properties are primarily commercial and retail businesses. US 17 Bus. meets US 117 and NC 132 at a partial cloverleaf interchange with College Road. The highway continues for 0.4 miles (0.64 km) east-northeast until reaching US 74 at Martin Luther King Jr. Parkway and Eastwood Road. US 17 Bus. continues along Market Street for 2.6 miles (4.2 km) through a primarily commercial area of Wilmington until reaching its northern terminus at US 17.

US 17 Bus. was established in 1971, two years after US 17 was realigned onto new routing; it traversed 1.8 miles (2.9 km) along 3rd and Market streets, between Dawson/Wooster and 16th/17th streets. Market Street was part of the original alignment but goes south instead of north along 3rd Street to meetup with US 17. In 1979, AASHTO officially recognized US 17 Bus. In 2005, AASHTO approved the US 17 Bus. extension upon completion of and realignment of US 17 along the Wilmington Bypass (I-140). On June 30, 2006, when the Wilmington bypass opened, US 17 Bus. replaced segments of US 17: north along Market Street, between 16th/17th streets and near Futch Creek Road, and south crossing the Cape Fear Memorial Bridge to Eagle Island. In May 2015, AASHTO approved a request to reroute US 17 back through Wilmington, following US 76 along Oleander Drive and Military Cutoff Road; the new alignment reduces the length of existing US 17 Bus. to along 3rd and Market streets. In May 2017, US 17 Bus. was officially reduced as approved by AASHTO.

Major intersections

The entire route is in Wilmington, New Hanover County.

mi	km	Destinations	Notes
0.0	0.0	US 17 north / US 76 east (Dawson Street) / US 421 south (3rd Street) – Wrightsville Beach, Carolina Beach	
0.8	1.3	North 3rd Street	
1.8	2.9	16th Street/17th Street	
5.1	8.2	US 117 / NC 132 (College Road) to I-40 – Carolina Beach, Burgaw, Jacksonville, Raleigh	To UNC Wilmington; partial cloverleaf interchange on US 117
5.6	9.0	US 74 (Martin Luther King Jr Parkway/Eastwood Road) – Wrightsville Beach, Downtown Wilmington	
8.1	13.0	NC 417 north (Military Cutoff Road)	Opened on September 28, 2023; Future US 17 Bypass
8.1	13.0	US 17 south (Military Cutoff Road) – Wrightsville Beach	
1.000 mi = 1.609 km; 1.000 km = 0.621 mi

=== Wilmington truck route ===
U.S. Highway 17 Truck
- Location: Wilmington, North Carolina
- Existed: 1980–2005

U.S. Highway 17 Truck (US 17 Truck) in Wilmington, North Carolina, used the one-way pairs of Dawson and Wooster streets (from 16th and 17th streets to Oleander Drive). Continuing east, it then used Oleander Drive and north along Military Cutoff Road before rejoining then mainline US 17 at Market Street. Mainline US 17 at the time used the Cape Fear Memorial Bridge, then split with Dawson and Wooster Streets until reaching 16th and 17th streets. Mainline US 17 then used 16th and 17th streets back to Market Street. Once Mainline US 17 was moved to I-140 in 2005, the truck route through Wilmington was deleted.

=== Hampstead bypass route ===
U.S. Highway 17 Bypass
- Location: Hampstead, North Carolina

=== Jacksonville business loop ===
U.S. Highway 17 Business
- Location: Jacksonville, North Carolina
- Length: 4.5 mi (7.2 km)
- Existed: 2006–present

U.S. Highway 17 Business (US 17 Bus.) was established in 2006 after the completion of the Jacksonville Bypass, which rerouted US 17/NC 24 south and east around Jacksonville, North Carolina. The old alignment along Wilmington Highway and Marine Boulevard became US 17 Bus, with a short 1.4-mile (2.3 km) overlap with NC 24 Bus.

Major intersections

The entire route is in Jacksonville, Onslow County.

mi	km	Destinations	Notes
0.0	0.0	US 17 / NC 24 east – Wilmington, Camp Lejeune, Morehead City, New Bern	
0.4	0.64	NC 24 – Richlands, Kinston, Morehead City, New Bern	Southbound access to US 17 northbound
1.1	1.8	US 258 north / NC 24 Bus. west (Richlands Highway) – Richlands, Kinston, Ellis Airport	West end of NC 24 Bus overlap
2.5	4.0	NC 24 Bus. east (Johnson Boulevard) – Camp Lejeune	East end of NC 24 Bus overlap
4.5	7.2	US 17 – New Bern, Morehead City, Camp Lejeune, Wilmington	
1.000 mi = 1.609 km; 1.000 km = 0.621 mi: Concurrency terminus

=== New Bern business loop ===
U.S. Highway 17 Business
- Location: New Bern, North Carolina
- Length: 10.5 mi (16.9 km)
- Existed: 2000–present

U.S. Highway 17 Business (US 17 Bus.) was established in 2000 as a renumbering of mainline US 17 through downtown New Bern, North Carolina, via Martin Luther King Jr. Boulevard, Neuse Boulevard, Broad Street, and Front Street. In 2011, the business loop was extended south as mainline US 17 was placed on new freeway west of New Bern.

Major intersections

County	Location	mi	km	Destinations	Notes
Jones		0.0	0.0	US 17 – Jacksonville, Washington	
Craven	New Bern	6.7	10.8	US 17 / US 70 – Cherry Point, Morehead City, Kinston	
Craven	New Bern	8.0	12.9	NC 55 west (Neuse Boulevard)	West end of NC 55 overlap
Craven	New Bern	8.4	13.5	NC 55 east (First Street)	East end of NC 55 overlap
Craven	New Bern	10.5	16.9	US 17 south / US 70 west / NC 55 west – Kinston, Jacksonville US 17 north / NC 55 east – Bayboro, Washington US 70 east – Havelock, Morehead City	
1.000 mi = 1.609 km; 1.000 km = 0.621 mi: Concurrency terminus

=== Vanceboro business loop ===
U.S. Highway 17 Business
- Location: Vanceboro, North Carolina
- Length: 4.1 mi (6.6 km)
- Existed: 1961–present

U.S. Highway 17 Business (US 17 Bus.) was established in 1961 when US 17 was rerouted, on a bypass route, east of Vanceboro, North Carolina. US 17 Bus. travels along Main Street, sharing 2.1 miles (3.4 km) of it with NC 43, since 1987.

Major intersections

The entire route is in Vanceboro, Craven County.

mi	km	Destinations	Notes
0.0	0.0	US 17 – New Bern, Chocowinity, Washington	South end of NC 43 overlap
2.1	3.4	NC 43 north to NC 118 west – Greenville	North end of NC 43 overlap
4.1	6.6	US 17 – Chocowinity, Washington, New Bern	
1.000 mi = 1.609 km; 1.000 km = 0.621 mi: Concurrency terminus

=== Chocowinity–Washington business loop ===
U.S. Highway 17 Business
- Location: Chocowinity–Washington, North Carolina
- Length: 6.0 mi (9.7 km)
- Existed: 2010–present

U.S. Highway 17 Business (US 17 Bus.) was established in 2010 when US 17 was rerouted, onto the new freeway, bypassing east of Chocowinity and west of Washington, North Carolina. US 17 Bus. follows the former section of US 17 through Chocowinity and along Bridge Street/Carolina Avenue in Washington.

Major intersections

The entire route is in Beaufort County.

Location	mi	km	Destinations	Notes
	0.0	0.0	US 17 – New Bern, Washington	Superstreet intersection, u-turn for US 17 north
Chocowinity	0.9	1.4	NC 33 – Greenville, Aurora	
Washington	4.3	6.9	NC 32 north (Third Street)	Southern terminus of NC 32
Washington	4.4	7.1	US 264 / NC 92 east (Pactolus Highway) – Belhaven, Bath, Greenville	
Washington	6.0	9.7	US 17 – Williamston, Chocowinity, New Bern	Superstreet intersection, u-turn for US 17 south
1.000 mi = 1.609 km; 1.000 km = 0.621 mi

=== Washington bypass route ===
U.S. Highway 17 Bypass
- Location: Washington, North Carolina

=== Williamston alternate route ===
U.S. Highway 17A
- Location: Williamston, North Carolina
- Existed: 1954–1960

=== Williamston business loop ===
U.S. Highway 17 Business
- Location: Williamston, North Carolina
- Length: 3.6 mi (5.8 km)
- Existed: 1960–present

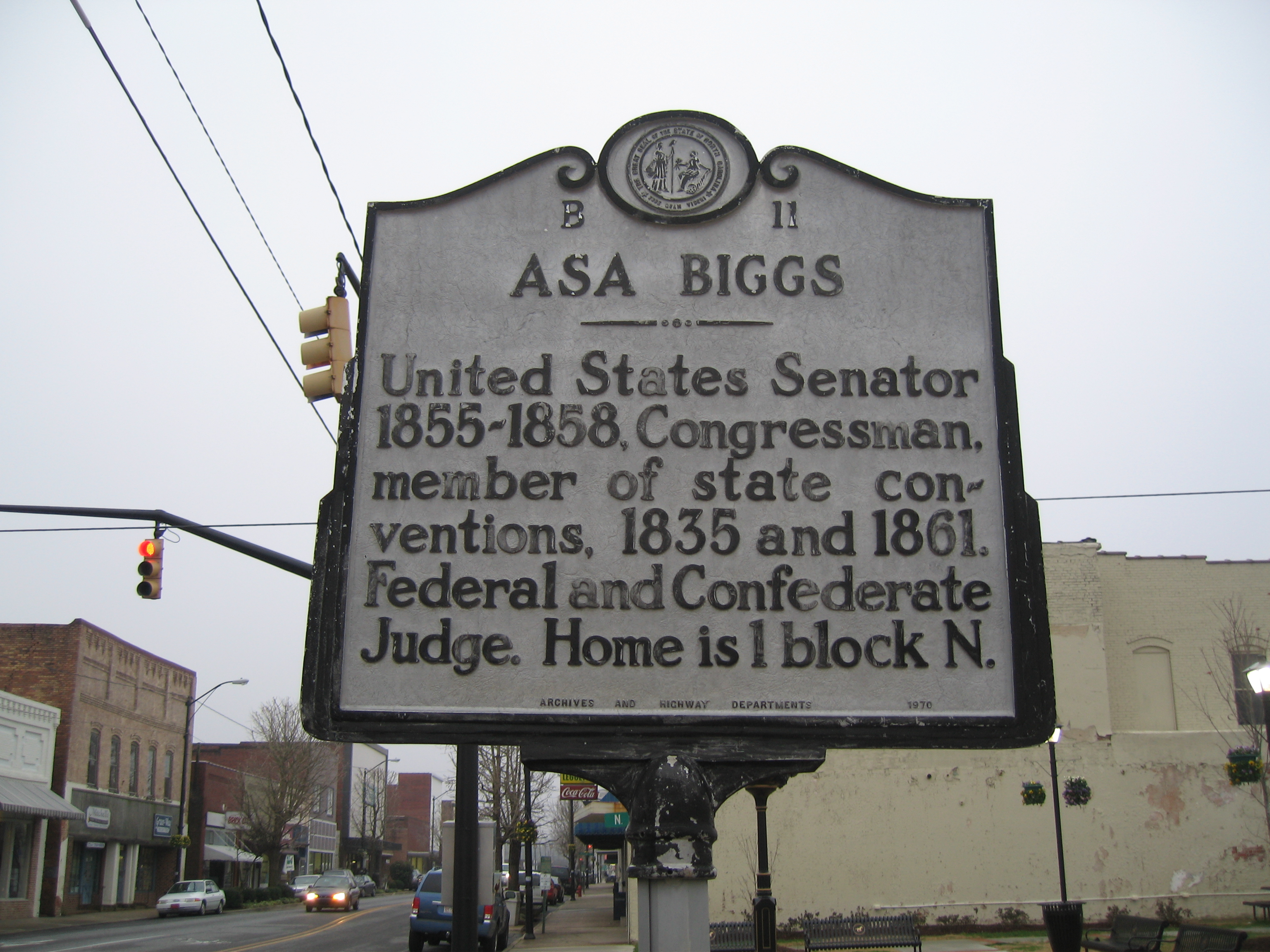
Historical marker on US 17 Bus. in Williamston

U.S. Highway 17 Business (US 17 Bus.) was established in 1960 as a renumbering of US 17A, which traversed through downtown Williamston, North Carolina, via Washington and Main streets. Between 1969 and 1977, US 17 Bus. is split in the downtown area, northbound on Haughton Street and southbound on Elm Street. In 2003, US 17 Bus. was extended 1.61 miles (2.59 km) that was formally US 17 when the new Williamston bypass was established.

Major intersections

The entire route is in Williamston, Martin County.

mi	km	Destinations	Notes
0.0	0.0	US 13 / US 17 / US 64 – Washington, Plymouth, Tarboro	
1.6	2.6	US 64 Alt. / NC 125 south – Windsor, Plymouth, Robersonville	South end of NC 125 overlap
2.6	4.2	NC 125 north (Haughton Street) – Hamilton	North end of NC 125 overlap
3.6	5.8	US 13 / US 17 – Windsor, Everetts, Tarboro	
1.000 mi = 1.609 km; 1.000 km = 0.621 mi: Concurrency terminus

=== Windsor alternate route ===
U.S. Highway 17A
- Location: Windsor, North Carolina
- Existed: 1954–1960

=== Windsor bypass route ===
U.S. Highway 17 Bypass
- Location: Windsor, North Carolina
- Length: 8.7 mi (14.0 km)
- Existed: 2009–present

U.S. Highway 17 Bypass (US 17 Byp.) was established in 2009 and is 8.7 miles (14.0 km) long. Beginning at the US 13/US 17 split, located southeast of Windsor, North Carolina, US 17 Byp. follows the preexisting expressway grade of US 13. At exit 215, US 13 splits and continues north, while US 17 Byp. continues on freeway-grade highway till it remerges with US 17, near milemarker 221.

Major intersections

The entire route is in Bertie County.

Location	mi	km	Exit	Destinations	Notes
Windsor	213.4	343.4		US 13 south / US 17 / US 13 Bus. north – Williamston, Windsor	South end of US 13 overlap; at-grade intersection
Windsor	214.0	344.4		NC 308 (Sterlingworth Street) – Lewiston-Woodville	At-grade intersection
Windsor	214.7	345.5	215	US 13 north / US 13 Bus. south – Ahoskie, Windsor	North end of US 13 overlap
	218.6	351.8	218	Wakelon Road	
	221.2	356.0		US 17 south – Windsor	At-grade intersection
1.000 mi = 1.609 km; 1.000 km = 0.621 mi: Concurrency terminus

=== Edenton business loop ===
U.S. Highway 17 Business
- Location: Edenton, North Carolina
- Length: 6.7 mi (10.8 km)
- Existed: 1977–present

U.S. Highway 17 Business (US 17 Bus.) was established in 1977 as a renumbering of mainline US 17 through Edenton, North Carolina, via Queen and Broad streets. In 1996, it was rerouted along Virginia Road to Broad Street and removed routing through the downtown area and along Queen Street, becoming SR 1204. However, in 2012, the North Carolina Department of Transportation reversed course and reverted the business loop back to its original routing; thanks in part of not completing the formal route change package and distributing it (i.e., updating the TEAAS and road signs in the area). NC 32 shares a concurrency along Broad Street in the downtown area.

Major intersections

The entire route is in Chowan County.

Location	mi	km	Destinations	Notes
	0.0	0.0	US 17 – Williamston, Hertford	
Edenton	3.6	5.8	NC 32 south (Church Street) – Plymouth	South end of NC 32 overlap
Edenton	4.2	6.8	NC 32 north (Virginia Road) – Sunbury	North end of NC 32 overlap
	6.7	10.8	US 17 – Hertford, Windsor	
1.000 mi = 1.609 km; 1.000 km = 0.621 mi: Concurrency terminus

=== Hertford–Winfall business loop ===
U.S. Highway 17 Business
- Location: Hertford–Winfall, North Carolina
- Length: 3.8 mi (6.1 km)
- Existed: 1966–present

U.S. Highway 17 Business (US 17 Bus.) was established in 1966 as a renumbering of mainline US 17 through Hertford (via Edenton Road, Dobbs, and Church streets) and Winfall (via Creek Drive), North Carolina. NC 37 shares a 0.9-mile (1.4 km) concurrency from Winfall Boulevard to the business loop's northern terminus.

Major intersections

The entire route is in Perquimans County.

Location	mi	km	Destinations	Notes
Hertford	0.0	0.0	US 17 – Edenton, Elizabeth City	
Winfall	2.9	4.7	NC 37 north (Winfall Boulevard) – Gatesville	North end of NC 37 overlap
Winfall	3.8	6.1	US 17 – Elizabeth City, Edenton	South end of NC 37 overlap
1.000 mi = 1.609 km; 1.000 km = 0.621 mi: Concurrency terminus

=== Elizabeth City alternate route ===
U.S. Highway 17A
- Location: Elizabeth City, North Carolina
- Existed: 1953–1960

=== Elizabeth City business loop ===
U.S. Highway 17 Business
- Location: Elizabeth City, North Carolina
- Length: 2.8 mi (4.5 km)
- Existed: 1960–present

U.S. Highway 17 Business (US 17 Bus.) was established in 1960 as a renumbering of US 17A through downtown Elizabeth City, North Carolina, via Ehringhaus and Road streets. The business loop has remained unchanged since its establishment.

Major intersections

The entire route is in Elizabeth City, Pasquotank County.

mi	km	Destinations	Notes
0.0	0.0	US 17 (Hughes Boulevard) – Chesapeake	No outlet to US 17 south
0.4	0.64	NC 344 (Halstead Boulevard) to US 17 south – Hertford	
2.1	3.4	US 158 (Elizabeth Street)	
2.8	4.5	US 17 / US 158 (Hughes Boulevard) – Chesapeake, Hertford	
1.000 mi = 1.609 km; 1.000 km = 0.621 mi: Incomplete access

=== Elizabeth City business truck route ===
U.S. Highway 17 Business Truck
- Location: Elizabeth City, North Carolina

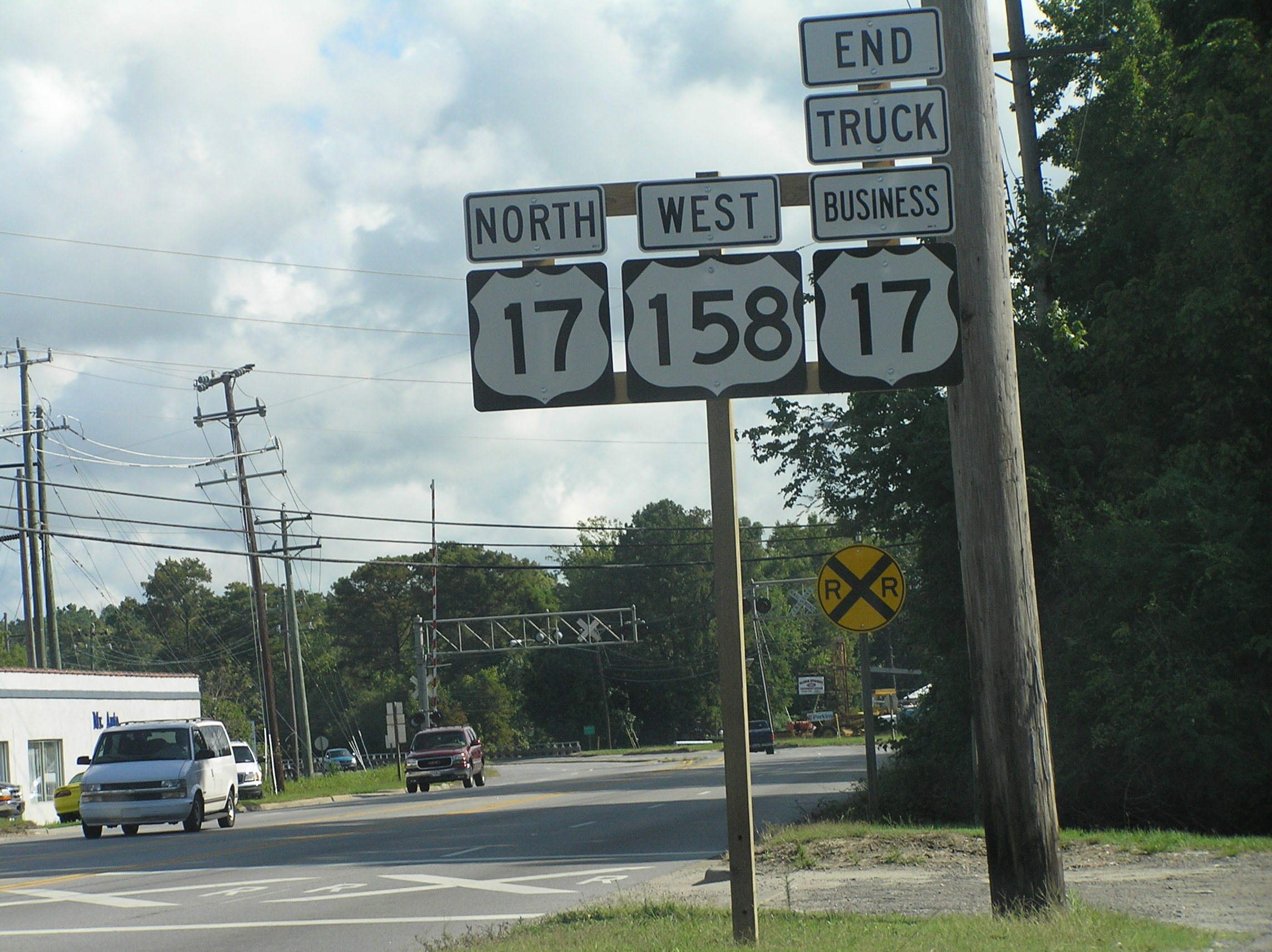
US 17 Bus. Truck shield at northern terminus, Elizabeth City

U.S. Highway 17 Business Truck (US 17 Bus. Truck) is a unique truck route specifically for US 17 Bus. in Elizabeth City, North Carolina. It follows US 158 west from the Camden Causeway and north along (mainline) US 17 to the junction with US 17 Bus. The bypassed segment of US 17 Bus. not only has a weight limit precluding most trucks over two axles but also passes through historic residential areas.

=== Elizabeth City bypass route ===
U.S. Highway 17 Bypass
- Location: Elizabeth City, North Carolina
- Length: 9.3 mi (15.0 km)
- Existed: 1999–present

U.S. Highway 17 Bypass (US 17 Byp.) was established in 2004 and is a 9.3-mile (15.0 km) controlled-access highway bypass west of Elizabeth City, North Carolina. Unlike typical bypasses, a separate mainline US 17 continues along original 1953 bypass route (Hughes Boulevard), while a business route goes through downtown Elizabeth City.

Major intersections

The entire route is in Pasquotank County.

Location	mi	km	Exit	Destinations	Notes
	255.0	410.4	255	US 17 south – Hertford, Edenton	Northbound entrance and southbound exit
	256.1	412.2	256	Foreman Bundy Road	Northbound entrance and southbound exit
Elizabeth City	258.2	415.5	258	NC 344 (Halstead Extension)	
	264.3	425.3	264	US 17 / US 158 – Chesapeake, Elizabeth City	
1.000 mi = 1.609 km; 1.000 km = 0.621 mi: Incomplete access

=== South Mills business loop ===
U.S. Highway 17 Business
- Location: South Mills, North Carolina
- Length: 2.8 mi (4.5 km)
- Existed: 1984–present

U.S. Highway 17 Business (US 17 Bus.) was established in September 1984 as a renumbering of mainline US 17 through South Mills, North Carolina, via Main Street. It is the northernmost US 17 Bus. in North Carolina. West of South Mills, it joins with NC 343 and continues north, rejoining with US 17.

Major intersections

The entire route is in Camden County.

Location	mi	km	Destinations	Notes
South Mills	0.0	0.0	US 17 – Elizabeth City, Portsmouth	
South Mills	1.2	1.9	NC 343 south – Camden	South end of NC 343 overlap
	2.8	4.5	US 17 / NC 343 north – Portsmouth, Elizabeth City	North end of NC 343 overlap
1.000 mi = 1.609 km; 1.000 km = 0.621 mi: Concurrency terminus

== Virginia ==
=== Chesapeake business loop ===
U.S. Route 17 Business
- Location: Chesapeake, Virginia

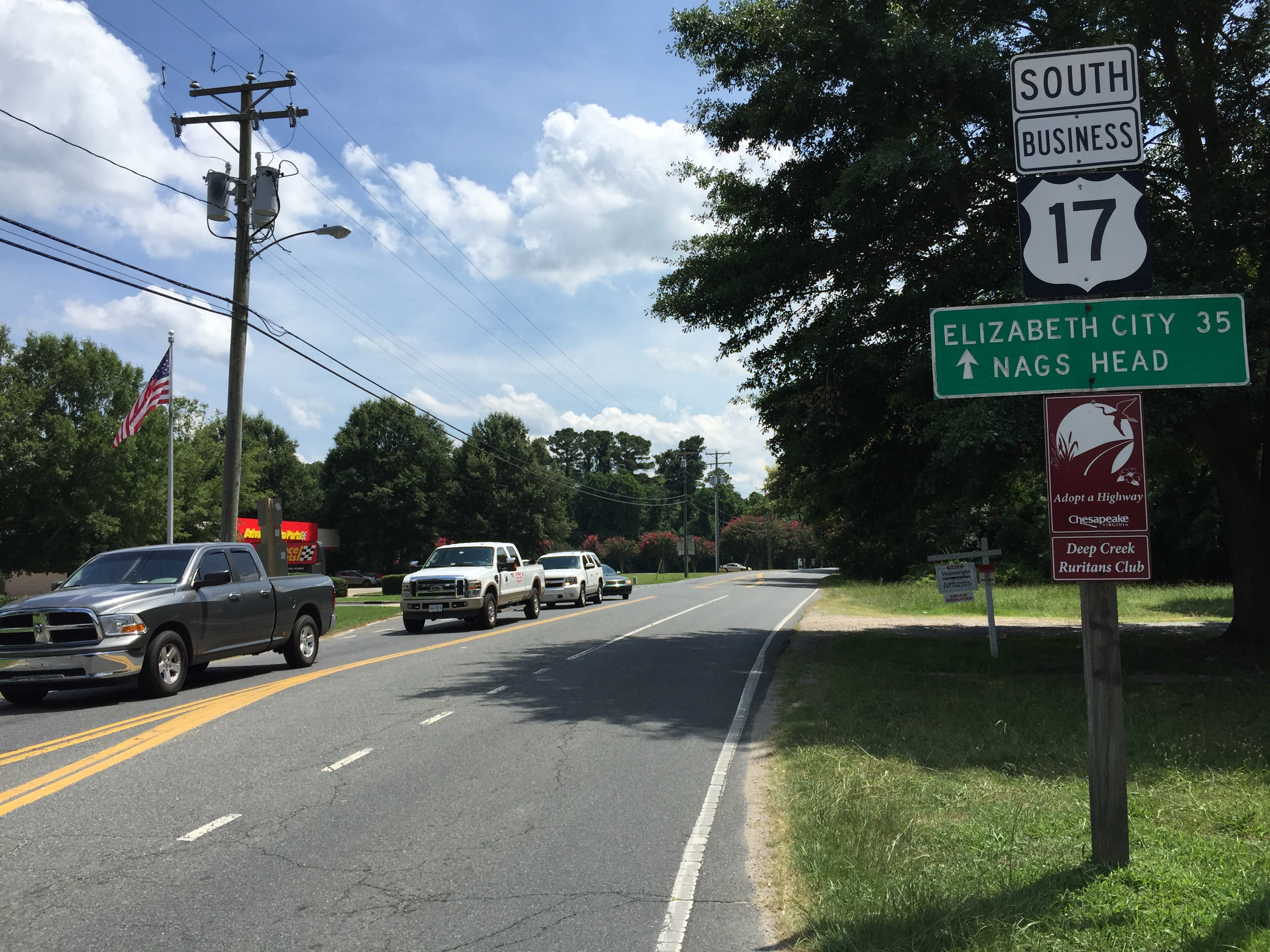
View south along US 17 Bus. at SR 165 in Chesapeake

U.S. Route 17 Business (US 17 Bus.) is an old alignment of US 17 along the Dismal Swamp Canal in Chesapeake, Virginia, that carries the US 17 Bus. designation north from the Dominion Boulevard intersection to Deep Creek, where US 17 Bus. crosses the canal on a small drawbridge, before proceeding north to rejoin US 17 at I-64 (exit 296).

=== Portsmouth business route ===
U.S. Route 17 Business
- Location: Portsmouth, Virginia

=== Gloucester Courthouse business loop ===
U.S. Route 17 Business
- Location: Gloucester Courthouse, Virginia

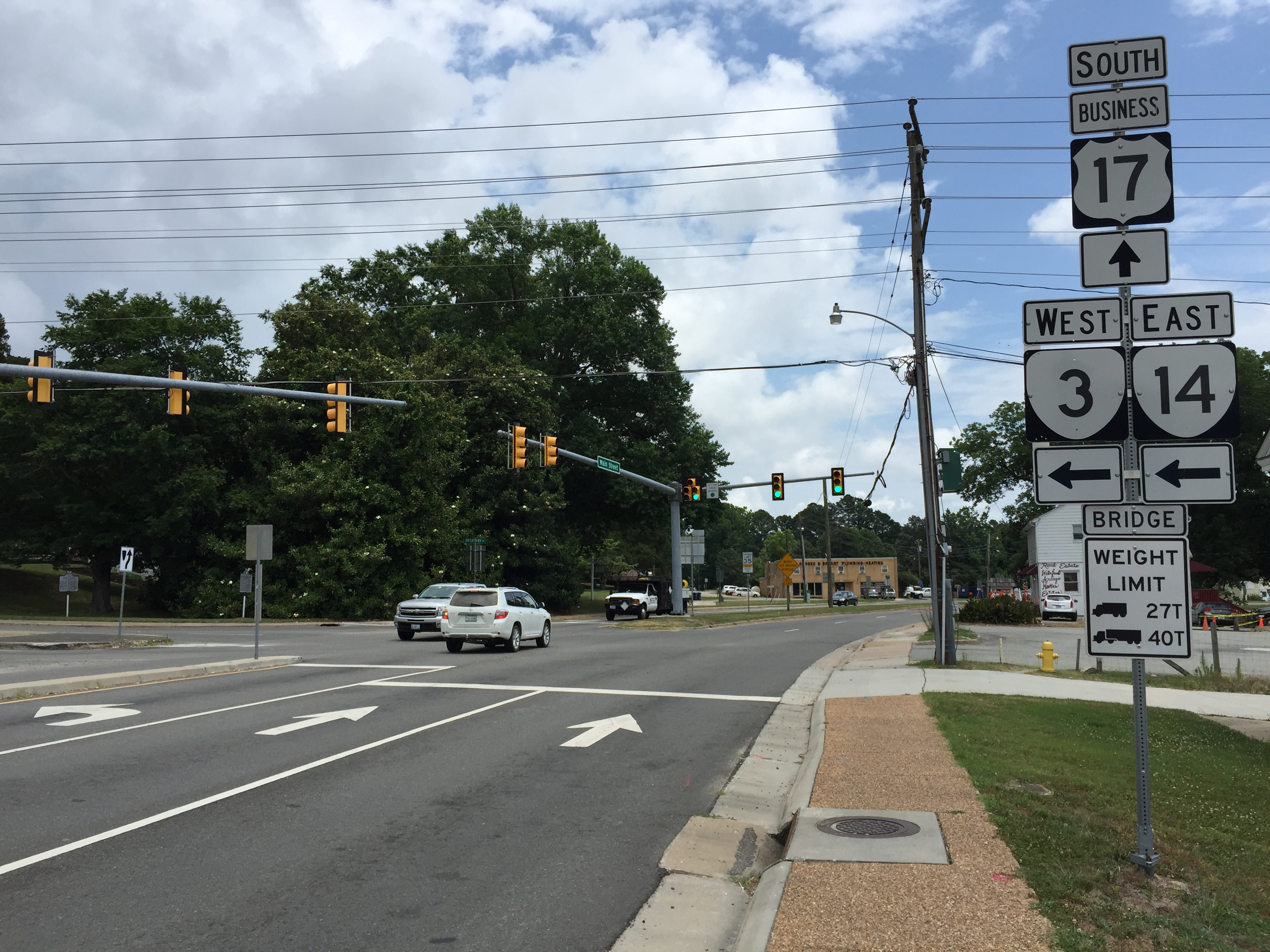
View south along US 17 Bus. at SR 3 and SR 14 in Gloucester Courthouse

U.S. Route 17 Business (US 17 Bus.) through Gloucester Courthouse, Virginia, consists of a 2.5-mile (4.0 km) loop, Main Street, that travels through the historic courthouse district, intersecting State Route 3 (SR 3) and SR 14. SR 14 multiplexes with US 17 Bus. on the northern leg back to US 17. Main Street is likely a former alignment of US 17, due to several US 17 shields on it that lack a business banner.

=== Saluda business loop ===
U.S. Route 17 Business
- Location: Saluda, Virginia

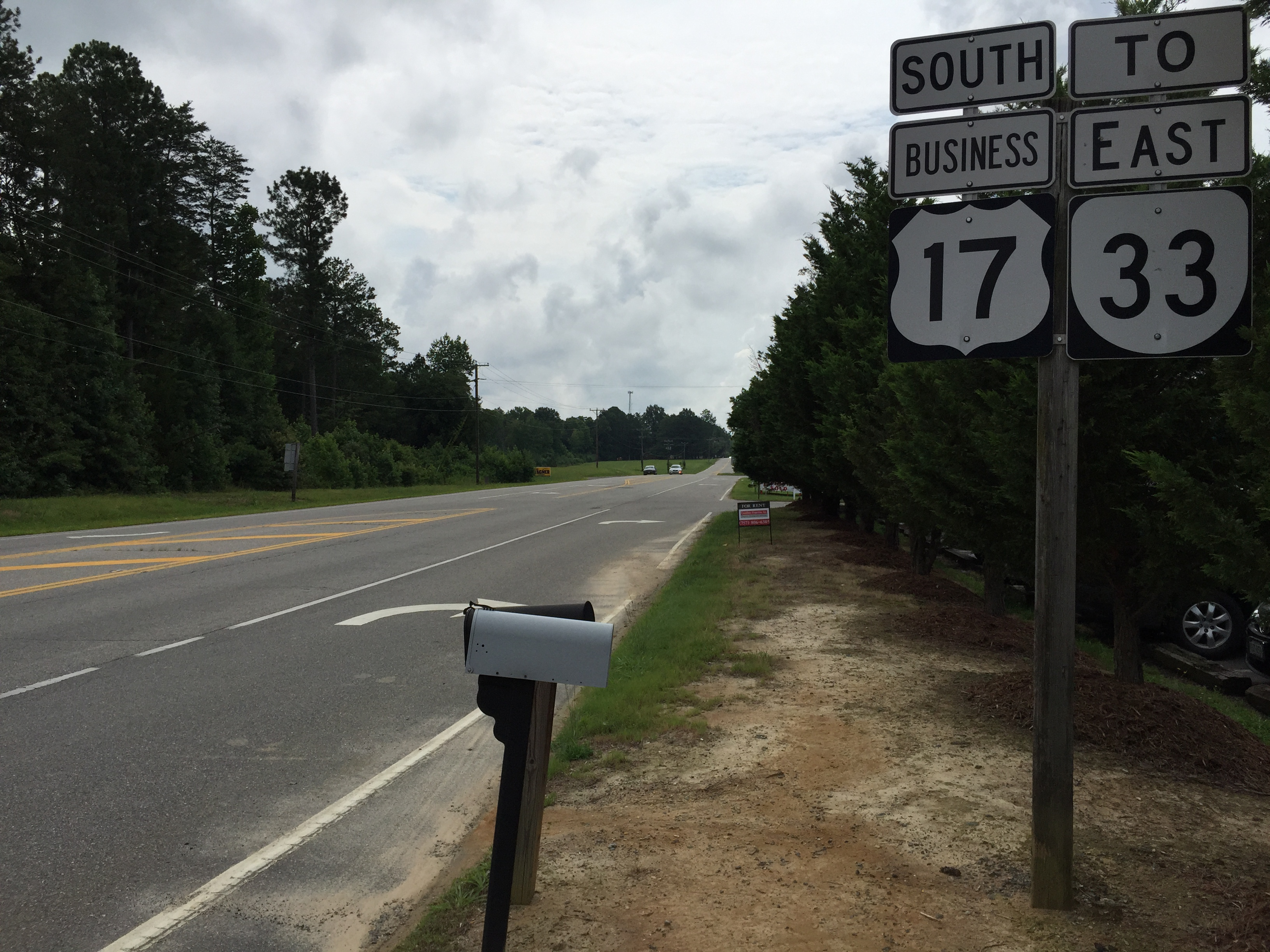
View south at the north end of US 17 Bus. at US 17 in Saluda

U.S. Route 17 Business (US 17 Bus.) in Saluda, Virginia, branches off of mainline US 17 (Tidewater Trail) to the northeast at Gloucester Road along with a concurrency with SR 33. One block after the wye, SR 618 joins the two routes from the intersection of Lovers Retreat Lane. At the intersection of General Puller Highway, SR 33 turns right as SR 618 continues north onto Oakes Landing Road and US 17 Bus. turns left. This segment also contains the name "School Street" and runs west until reaching mainline US 17 once again.

=== Fredericksburg business loop ===
U.S. Route 17 Business
- Location: Fredericksburg, Virginia

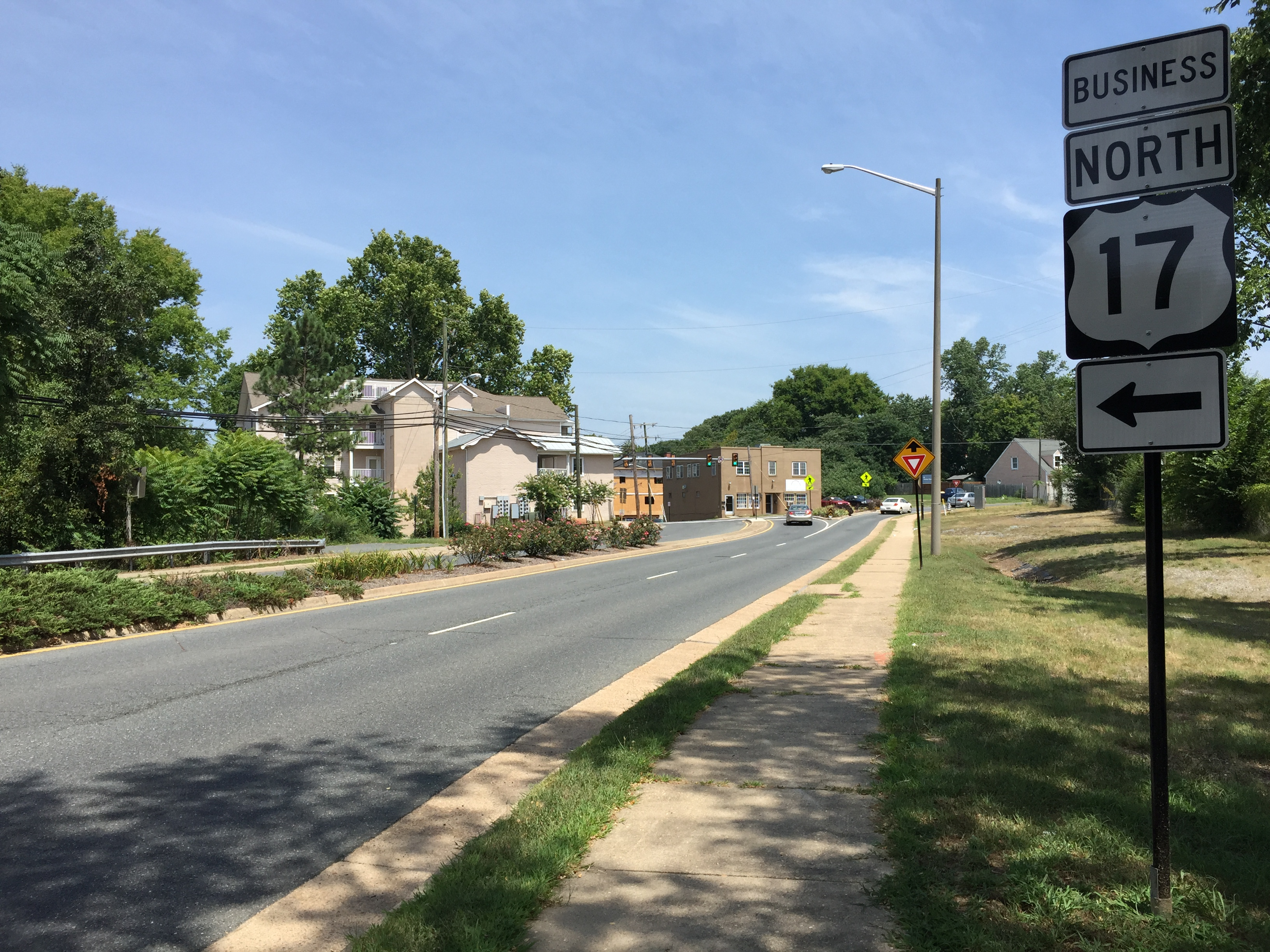
View north along US 17 Bus. and SR 2 north of SR 3 in Fredericksburg

U.S. Route 17 Business (US 17 Bus.) through the vicinity of Fredericksburg, Virginia, begins at the intersection of US 17 and SR 2 southeast of Fredericksburg, where they both become Tidewater Trail. From there, the road passes by Fredericksburg Country Club, Shannon Airport, and the Fredericksburg Agricultural Fairgrounds. Within the city limits, Tidewater Trail becomes Dixon Street and crosses under the Blue and Gray Parkway interchange, then curves right before splitting onto southbound Princess Anne Street and northbound Caroline Street. Both streets cross under Fredericksburg station, where US 1 Bus. joins US 17 Bus. along the same parallel one-way streets, until they reach Herndon Street and become a two-way street again at Princess Anne Street. US 1 Bus./US 17 Bus. continues to run northwest until it reaches US 1 where US 1 Bus. terminates, but US 17 Bus. joins and cross the Rappahannock River, and enters Falmouth. US 17 Bus. leaves US 1 at the west end of SR 218 where it runs northwest onto Warrenton Road before finally terminating at the north end of the I-95/US 17 multiplex at exit 133B.

=== Fredericksburg bypass route ===
U.S. Route 17 Bypass
- Location: Fredericksburg, Virginia

=== Warrenton business loop ===
U.S. Route 17 Business
- Location: Warrenton, Virginia

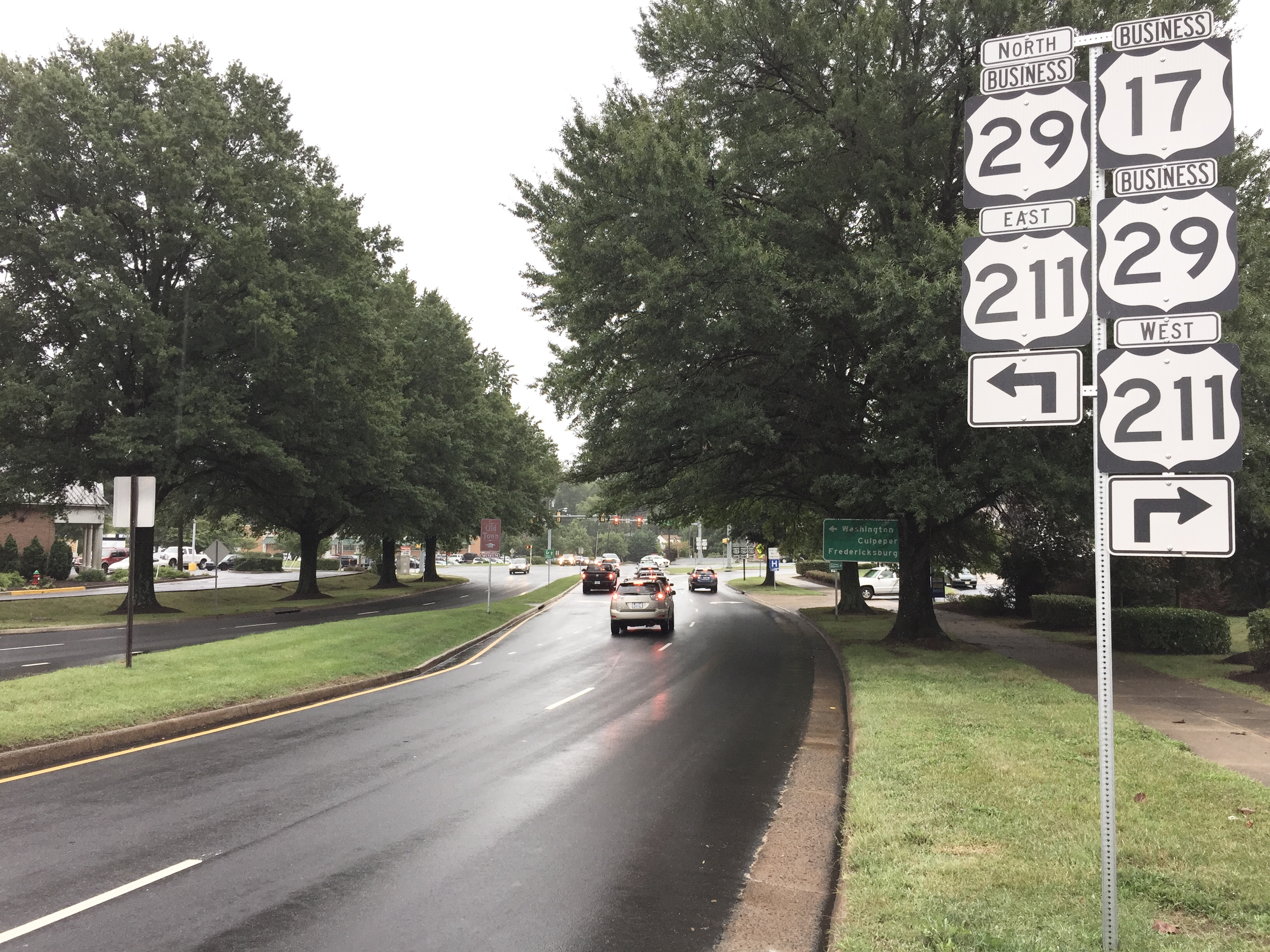
View south along US 17 Bus., just north of US 211 and US 29 Bus. in Warrenton

U.S. Route 17 Business (US 17 Bus.) in Warrenton, Virginia, is also multiplexed with US 15 Bus. and US 29 Bus., at least at the southern end. After James Madison Highway becomes Shirley Avenue, US 15 Bus. leaves this concurrency at Falmouth Street. US 211 joins the two business routes as US 211 Bus. runs east along Waterloo Street, and US 211/US 17 Bus./US 29 Bus. becomes Broadview Avenue. As the triplex curves right, and intersects Roebling Street, it becomes Lee Highway, and US 17 Bus. makes a left turn onto Broadview Avenue, a name it will keep until the intersection of Foxcroft Road and becomes the James Madison Highway before terminating at the interchange with mainline US 17.

=== Marshall business loop ===
U.S. Route 17 Business
- Location: Marshall, Virginia

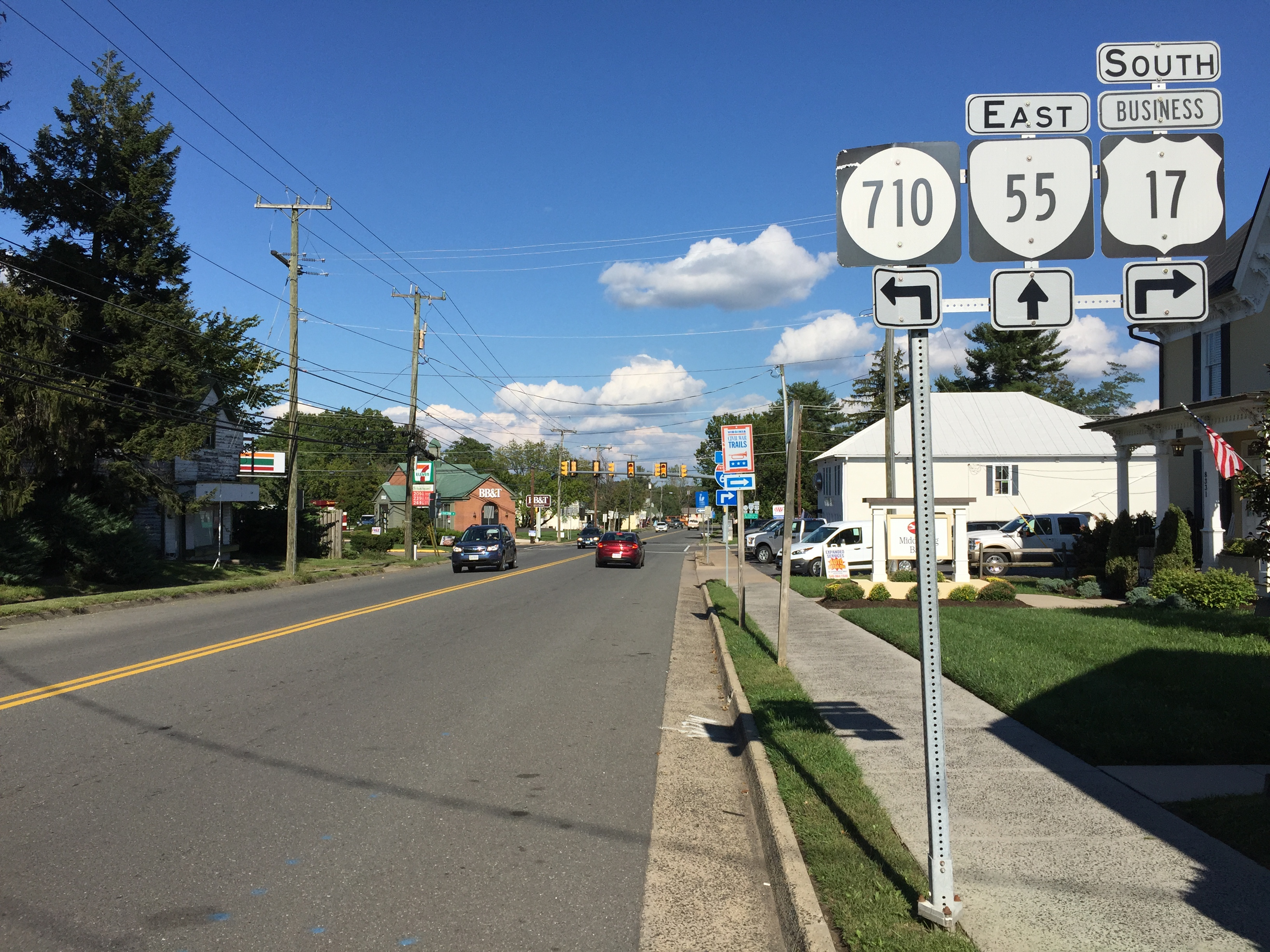
View south along US 17 Bus. at SR 710 in Marshall

U.S. Route 17 Business (US 17 Bus.) through the vicinity of Marshall, Virginia, runs northeast from exit 27 on I-66, partially along SR 55 (Free State Road and West Main Street), then turns southeast onto Winchester Road as it reunites with US 17 at exit 28 on I-66.

== See also ==
- List of special routes of the United States Numbered Highway System
