= Mintonsville, North Carolina =

- Unincorporated community
- Location within North Carolina Location within the United States
- Coordinates: 36°20′35″N 76°38′09″W
- Country: United States
- State: North Carolina
- County: Gates
- Elevation: 26 ft (7.9 m)
- Time zone: UTC-5 (Eastern (EST))
  - Summer (DST): UTC-4 (EDT)
- Area code: 252
- GNIS feature ID: 1021494

Mintonsville is an unincorporated community in Gates County, North Carolina, United States. Both North Carolina Highway 32 and North Carolina Highway 37 pass through the community, which is located approximately 8 miles (13 km) southeast of the county seat of Gatesville.
