= Sunbury High School =

Historic school building in North Carolina, United States

- U.S. National Register of Historic Places
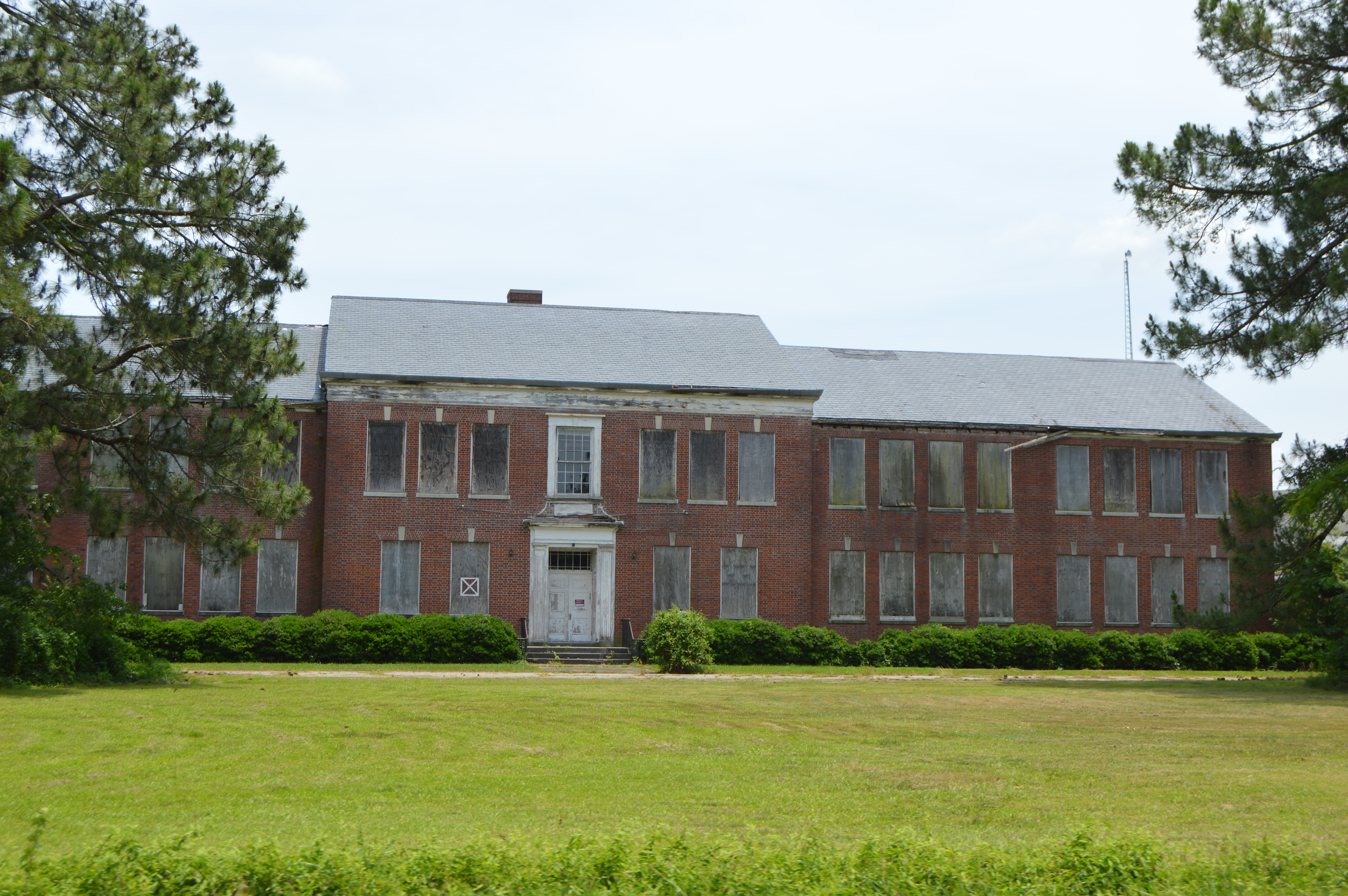
- Front

- Location within North Carolina Location within the United States
- Location: 101 NC 32 N., Sunbury, North Carolina
- Coordinates: 36°26′49″N 76°36′0″W
- Area: 7 acres (2.8 ha)
- Built: c. 1908, 1937, c. 1940, c. 1941, c. 1950
- Architectural style: Colonial Revival
- NRHP reference No.: 09000332
- Added to NRHP: May 12, 2009

Sunbury High School is a historic high school complex located at Sunbury, Gates County, North Carolina. The complex consists of five buildings built between 1908 and about 1950. The main building was built in 1937, and is a two-story, Colonial Revival-style brick building. It consists of a seven bay, side-gabled main block flanked by two, long, slightly lower two-story, side-gabled wings. Also on the property is a two-story, side-gable frame, Colonial Revival-style Teacherage, built about 1940; a one-story, six-bay, "T-shaped", Agricultural Building built about 1908; a Gymnasium built about 1950; and a Pump-House/Oil House, built about 1941. The complex served as a high school until 1962. It housed an elementary school until it closed in 1997.

It was listed on the National Register of Historic Places in 2009.
