= Mackeys Ferry, North Carolina =

- Unincorporated community
- Nickname: a.k.a. Mackeys
- Interactive map of Mackeys Ferry, North Carolina
- Coordinates: 35°56′01″N 76°36′40″W
- Country: United States
- State: North Carolina
- County: Washington
- Elevation: 10 ft (3.0 m)
- Time zone: UTC-5 (Eastern (EST))
  - Summer (DST): UTC-4 (EDT)
- ZIP code: 27970 (Roper, NC)
- Area code: 252
- GNIS feature ID: 989213

Mackeys Ferry, a.k.a. Mackeys, is an unincorporated community in Washington County, North Carolina, United States. Mackeys Ferry is located in North Carolina's Inner Banks region and is located at the mouth of the Mackeys Creek on the south side of the Albemarle Sound.

== Railroad history ==
The Norfolk Southern Railway ran through Mackeys Ferry since the turn of the 20th century. Branch lines ran from Mackeys Ferry to Columbia and to Belhaven. These branch lines connected to the main line that ran between Raleigh, via Plymouth, and Norfolk via Edenton and Elizabeth City.

Prior to the Albemarle Sound Trestle being built, trains used to cross to Edenton via a ferry. In 1910 the Norfolk Southern Railroad built a wooden trestle bridging the 5.05 mi from Mackeys to Edenton In the late 1980s Norfolk Southern discontinued use of the Albemarle Sound Trestle due to maintenance costs and subsequently dismantled it. This created a spur line from Plymouth to Mackeys. Agriculture products were loaded at the site where the Mackeys Ferry train station used to be until 2004 when the tracks were removed. Today the tracks only run a mile outside the Plymouth city limits to the east into the industrial park.
