= Pea Ridge, North Carolina =

Human settlement in North Carolina, United States

Coordinates: 35°57′29″N 76°28′43″W

Pea Ridge is an unincorporated community in Washington County, North Carolina, United States, on the south side of the Albemarle Sound near the Albemarle Sound Bridge.
