= Roper, North Carolina =

- Town
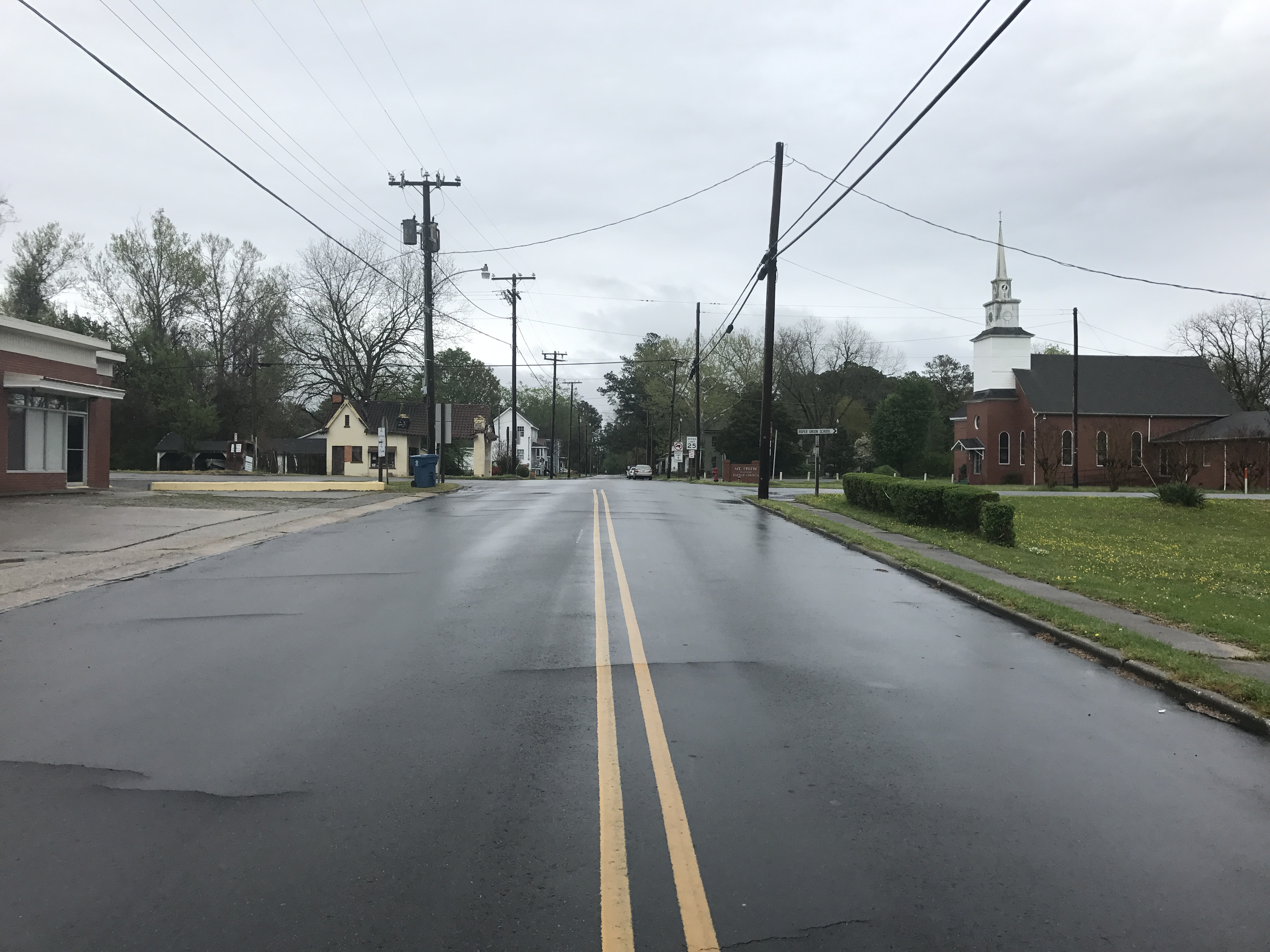

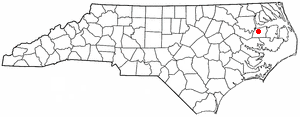
- Location of Roper, North Carolina
- Coordinates: 35°52′43″N 76°37′01″W
- Country: United States
- State: North Carolina
- County: Washington

Area
  - Total: 0.86 sq mi (2.22 km^{2})
  - Land: 0.86 sq mi (2.22 km^{2})
  - Water: 0 sq mi (0.00 km^{2})
- Elevation: 0 ft (0 m)

Population (2020)
  - Total: 485
  - Density: 566.3/sq mi (218.64/km^{2})
- Time zone: UTC-5 (Eastern (EST))
  - Summer (DST): UTC-4 (EDT)
- ZIP code: 27970
- Area code: 252
- FIPS code: 37-57740
- GNIS feature ID: 2407241
- Website: https://www.townofroper.com/

Roper is a town in Washington County, North Carolina, United States. The population was 485 at the 2020 Census. It was known as Lee's Mill (named for Thomas Lee) until 1890, when the John L. Roper Lumber Company was established in the town and its name changed to Roper.

== Geography ==
According to the United States Census Bureau, the town has a total area of 0.9 square miles (2.3 km^{2}), all land.

== Demographics ==
Historical population
| Census | Pop. | Note | %± |
|---|---|---|---|
| 1910 | 819 | | — |
| 1920 | 1,043 | | 27.4% |
| 1930 | 660 | | −36.7% |
| 1940 | 716 | | 8.5% |
| 1950 | 793 | | 10.8% |
| 1960 | 771 | | −2.8% |
| 1970 | 649 | | −15.8% |
| 1980 | 795 | | 22.5% |
| 1990 | 669 | | −15.8% |
| 2000 | 613 | | −8.4% |
| 2010 | 611 | | −0.3% |
| 2020 | 485 | | −20.6% |
U.S. Decennial Census

=== 2020 census ===
Roper town, North Carolina – Racial and ethnic composition Note: the US Census treats Hispanic/Latino as an ethnic category. This table excludes Latinos from the racial categories and assigns them to a separate category. Hispanics/Latinos may be of any race.
| Race / Ethnicity (NH = Non-Hispanic) | Pop 2000 | Pop 2010 | Pop 2020 | % 2000 | % 2010 | % 2020 |
|---|---|---|---|---|---|---|
| White alone (NH) | 121 | 111 | 70 | 19.74% | 18.17% | 14.43% |
| Black or African American alone (NH) | 458 | 479 | 390 | 74.71% | 78.40% | 80.41% |
| Native American or Alaska Native alone (NH) | 0 | 0 | 1 | 0.00% | 0.00% | 0.21% |
| Asian alone (NH) | 0 | 0 | 5 | 0.00% | 0.00% | 1.03% |
| Native Hawaiian or Pacific Islander alone (NH) | 0 | 0 | 0 | 0.00% | 0.00% | 0.00% |
| Other race alone (NH) | 0 | 0 | 0 | 0.00% | 0.00% | 0.00% |
| Mixed race or Multiracial (NH) | 3 | 3 | 10 | 0.49% | 0.49% | 2.06% |
| Hispanic or Latino (any race) | 31 | 18 | 9 | 5.06% | 2.95% | 1.86% |
| Total | 613 | 611 | 485 | 100.00% | 100.00% | 100.00% |

=== 2000 census ===
As of the census of 2020, there were 485 people, 238 households, residing in the town. The population density was 566.59 people per square mile (218.64 people per km^{2}). There were 268 housing units at an average density of 309.0 per square mile (119.3/km^{2}). The racial makeup of the town was 14.78% White, 78.95% African American, 4.25% from other races, and 0.82% from two or more races. Hispanic or Latino of any race were 1.82% of the population.

There were 238 households, of which 31.9% had children under the age of 18 living with them, 37.0% were married couples living together, 28.2% had a female householder with no husband present, and 30.3% were not families. About 29.4% of all households were made up of individuals, and 17.6% had someone living alone who was 65 years of age or older. The average household size was 2.58 and the average family size was 3.16.

In the town, the population was distributed as 35.4% under the age of 19, 3.1% from 20 to 24, 22.2% from 25 to 44, 21.6% from 45 to 64, and 17.7% who were 65 years of age or older. The median age was 37.4 years. For every 100 females, there were 75.6 males.

The median income for a household in the town was $19,536, and the median income for a family was $29,457. About 52.2% of the population were below the poverty line, including 72.1% of those under age 18 and 6.1% of those age 65 or over.
