= Sunbury, North Carolina =

- Census-designated place
- Location within North Carolina Location within the United States
- Coordinates: 36°26′49″N 76°36′46″W
- Country: United States
- State: North Carolina
- County: Gates
- Named after: Sunbury, Pennsylvania

Area
  - Total: 2.45 sq mi (6.35 km^{2})
  - Land: 2.45 sq mi (6.35 km^{2})
  - Water: 0 sq mi (0.00 km^{2})
- Elevation: 33 ft (10 m)

Population (2020)
  - Total: 276
  - Density: 112.6/sq mi (43.49/km^{2})
- Time zone: UTC-5 (Eastern (EST))
  - Summer (DST): UTC-4 (EDT)
- ZIP code: 27979
- Area code: 252
- GNIS feature ID: 2628658
- FIPS code: 37-65700

Sunbury is a census-designated place (CDP) and unincorporated community in Gates County, North Carolina, United States. As of the 2020 census, Sunbury had a population of 276.

Sunbury is located at the junction of U.S. Route 158 and North Carolina Highway 32, 10 miles (16 km) east-northeast of Gatesville, the Gates County seat. Sunbury has a post office with ZIP code 27979.

Sunbury High School was listed on the National Register of Historic Places in 2009.

== Demographics ==
Historical population
Census	Pop.	Note	%±
2010	289		—
2020	276		−4.5%
U.S. Decennial Census

=== 2020 census ===
Sunbury racial composition
Race	Number	Percentage
White (non-Hispanic)	199	72.1%
Black or African American (non-Hispanic)	50	18.12%
Native American	1	0.36%
Pacific Islander	1	0.36%
Other/Mixed	11	3.99%
Hispanic or Latino	14	5.07%

As of the 2020 United States census, there were 276 people, 164 households, and 115 families residing in the CDP.
