= Columbia, North Carolina =

- Town
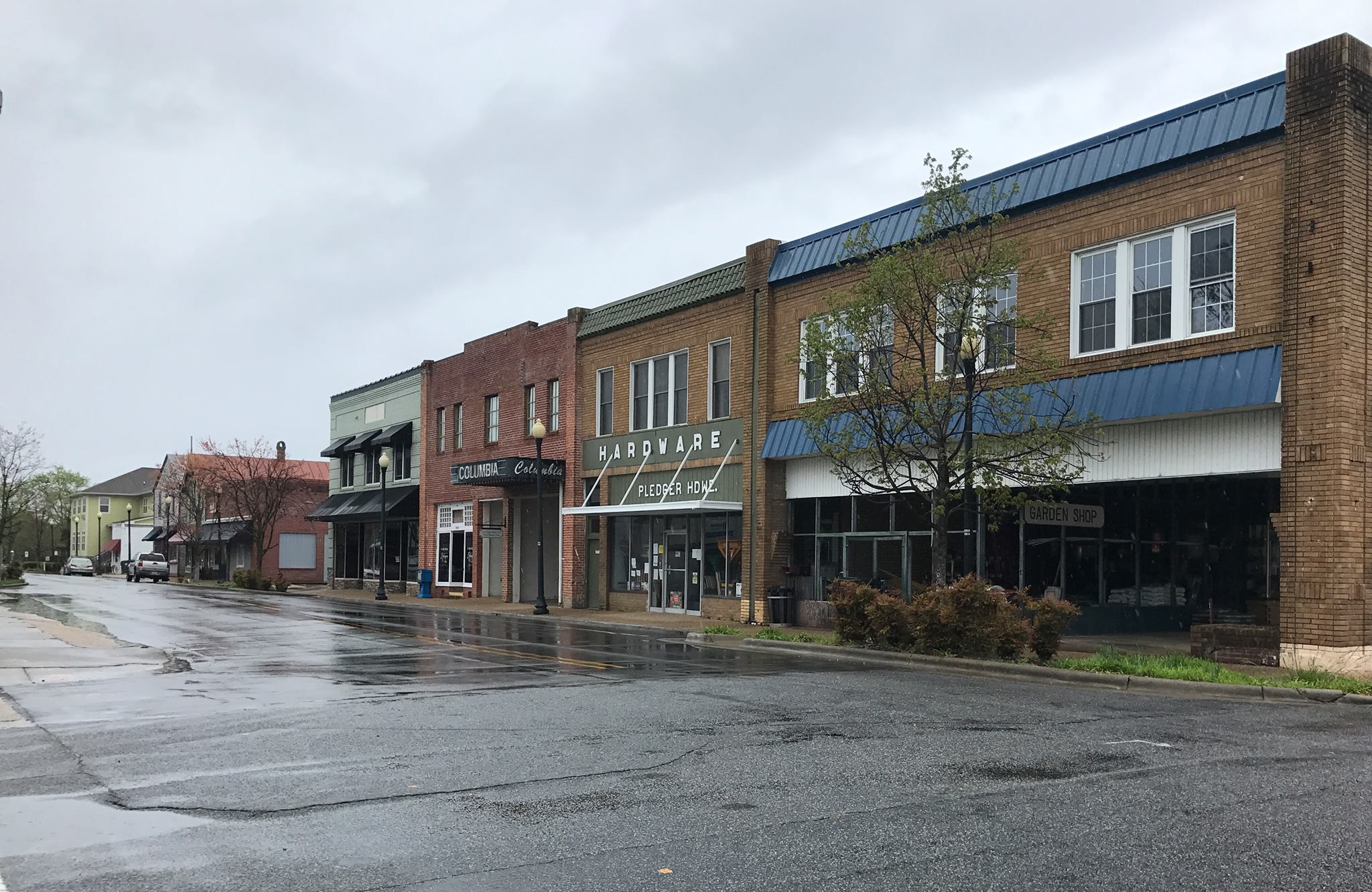
- Main Street in Columbia

- Seal

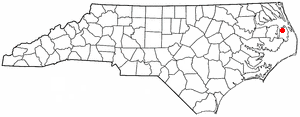
- Location of Columbia, North Carolina

- Location in the United States
- Coordinates: 35°55′12″N 76°14′32″W
- Country: United States
- State: North Carolina
- County: Tyrrell

Area
  - Total: 1.25 sq mi (3.23 km^{2})
  - Land: 1.23 sq mi (3.18 km^{2})
  - Water: 0.019 sq mi (0.05 km^{2})
- Elevation: 3 ft (0.91 m)

Population (2020)
  - Total: 610
  - Density: 496.6/sq mi (191.75/km^{2})
- Time zone: UTC-5 (Eastern (EST))
  - Summer (DST): UTC-4 (EDT)
- ZIP code: 27925
- Area code: 252
- FIPS code: 37-13940
- GNIS feature ID: 2406300
- Website: www.townofcolumbianc.com

Columbia is a town in Tyrrell County, North Carolina, United States. The population was 610 at the 2020 census. It is the county seat of Tyrrell County.

== Geography ==
The Albemarle-Pamlico Peninsula is located in northeastern North Carolina, inshore of Nags Head and the Outer Banks in the Inner Banks region. The peninsula is framed by Albemarle Sound to the north, Alligator River to the east, and the Scuppernong River to the west.

According to the United States Census Bureau, the town has a total area of 0.5 square miles (1.3 km^{2}), all land.

== History ==
Tyrrell County was Named for Sir John Tyrrell, one of the Lords Proprietors of the Carolina colony. Tyrrell County's boundaries originally stretched westward from Roanoke Island to near present-day Tarboro. In 1870, the territory was divided and resulted in what is now known as Tyrrell, Martin, Washington, and Dare counties. Elizabethtown, later renamed Columbia, was established on the banks of the Scuppernong River in 1793, and became the Tyrrell County seat in 1799.

Somerset Place State Historic Site, a representative antebellum plantation dating from 1785, is located near Columbia. Beginning in 1829, this was home to two generations of the Collins family-Josiah Collins III, his wife Mary, and their six sons. It was also home to more than 300 enslaved men, women, and children of African descent whose lives and work are interpreted here as well. Somerset Place offers an insightful view of plantation life during the antebellum period.

The earliest newspaper in Columbia is known as the Eagle and its last known issue is from April 1, 1943.

Columbia's archaeology and National Register of Historic Places.

== Demographics ==
Historical population
Census	Pop.	Note	%±
1880	166		—
1890	209		25.9%
1900	382		82.8%
1910	848		122.0%
1920	738		−13.0%
1930	864		17.1%
1940	1,090		26.2%
1950	1,161		6.5%
1960	1,099		−5.3%
1970	902		−17.9%
1980	758		−16.0%
1990	836		10.3%
2000	819		−2.0%
2010	891		8.8%
2020	610		−31.5%
U.S. Decennial Census

=== Racial and ethnic composition ===
Columbia, North Carolina – Racial and ethnic composition Note: the US Census treats Hispanic/Latino as an ethnic category. This table excludes Latinos from the racial categories and assigns them to a separate category. Hispanics/Latinos may be of any race.
Race / Ethnicity (NH = Non-Hispanic)	Pop 2000	Pop 2010	Pop 2020	% 2000	% 2010	% 2020
White alone (NH)	312	327	192	38.10%	36.70%	31.48%
Black or African American alone (NH)	426	384	248	52.01%	43.10%	40.66%
Native American or Alaska Native alone (NH)	1	1	0	0.12%	0.11%	0.00%
Asian alone (NH)	12	29	3	1.47%	3.25%	0.49%
Native Hawaiian or Pacific Islander alone (NH)	0	0	0	0.00%	0.00%	0.00%
Other race alone (NH)	0	0	1	0.00%	0.00%	0.16%
Mixed race or Multiracial (NH)	8	5	16	0.98%	0.56%	2.62%
Hispanic or Latino (any race)	60	145	150	7.33%	16.27%	24.59%
Total	819	891	610	100.00%	100.00%	100.00%

=== 2020 census ===
As of the 2020 United States census, there were 610 people, 338 households, and 197 families residing in the town.

=== 2000 census ===
As of the census of 2000, there were 819 people, 341 households, and 221 families residing in the town. The population density was 1,756.7 inhabitants per square mile (678.3/km^{2}). There were 411 housing units at an average density of 881.6 per square mile (340.4/km^{2}). The racial makeup of the town was 39.19% White, 52.26% African American, 0.12% Native American, 1.47% Asian, 5.13% from other races, and 1.83% from two or more races. Hispanic or Latino of any race were 7.33% of the population.

There were 341 households, out of which 26.4% had children under the age of 18 living with them, 30.8% were married couples living together, 28.7% had a female householder with no husband present, and 34.9% were non-families. 31.4% of all households were made up of individuals, and 17.9% had someone living alone who was 65 years of age or older. The average household size was 2.37 and the average family size was 2.93.

In the town, the population was spread out, with 26.6% under the age of 18, 9.4% from 18 to 24, 23.9% from 25 to 44, 20.5% from 45 to 64, and 19.5% who were 65 years of age or older. The median age was 39 years. For every 100 females, there were 85.3 males. For every 100 females age 18 and over, there were 73.2 males.

The median income for a household in the town was $20,588, and the median income for a family was $21,563. Males had a median income of $19,821 versus $17,361 for females. The per capita income for the town was $12,216. About 27.9% of families and 33.7% of the population were below the poverty line, including 53.6% of those under age 18 and 13.5% of those age 65 or over.

Due to Columbia's proximity to the Outer Banks, land and property value have increased dramatically since 2000 and with that the local demographics have also changed. .

== Notable persons ==
- Brian Rowsom, former NBA player
