= North Carolina Highway 21 =

Former state highway in North Carolina, United States

North Carolina Highway 21

Route information
- Length: 160.1 mi (257.7 km)
- Existed: 1921–1934

Major junctions
- South end: US 17 / NC 20 near Delco
- North end: US 15 / NC 75 in Creedmoor

Location
- Country: United States
- State: North Carolina

Highway system
- North Carolina Highway System; Interstate; US; State; Scenic
← US 21	→ NC 22

North Carolina Highway 21 (NC 21) was a primary state highway in the U.S. state of North Carolina. Originally, NC 21 began at the South Carolina state line west of Fair Bluff. The highway travelled north connecting Lumberton, Fayetteville, and Lillington before ending in Raleigh. By 1926, the highway was realigned south of Fayetteville, beginning in Whiteville and running north through Elizabethtown and Dublin before reaching Fayetteville. The highway was realigned once again in 1929, replacing NC 231 from Elizabethtown to U.S. Route 17/NC 20 near Delco and being routed north of Raleigh to US 15/NC 75 Creedmoor.

== Route description ==
NC 21 began at US 17/NC 20 east of Delco. The highway ran 33 miles (53 km) to the northwest to Elizabethtown, largely paralleling the Cape Fear River north of Acme. NC 21 intersected US 701/NC 23 in Elizabethtown. From Elizabethtown, NC 21 ran west through Dublin, intersecting NC 201 northwest of the town. From NC 201, the highway continued north for 30 miles (48 km) through Tarheel to Fayetteville. In Fayetteville, NC 21 began a concurrency with US 401 to Raleigh. NC 21 also ran concurrently with US 421, NC 60, and NC 210 for 1 mile (1.6 km) northeast of Lillington. The US 401/US 421/NC 21/NC 60/NC 210 concurrency crossed the Cape Fear River and the highways split at an intersection north of the bridge. From the intersection US 401/NC 21 continued north, entering Wake County near Fuquay Springs. US 401 ended in Raleigh, and NC 21 traveled north for 27 miles (43 km) from Raleigh to US 15/NC 56/NC 75 in Creedmoor.

== History ==
NC 21 was established in 1921 as an original North Carolina state highway. At the time of establishment, the highway ran from South Carolina Highway 47 (SC 47) to NC 10 in Raleigh. The highway traveled through Lumberton, Fayetteville, and Lillington between its termini.

By 1926, NC 21 was rerouted south of Fayetteville. The southern terminus was moved to NC 20 in Whiteville. NC 21 traveled north through Clarkton to Elizabethtown, where it turned to the northwest toward Fayetteville. The NC 21 realignment largely replaced NC 22 south of Fayetteville. The former alignment of NC 21 between South Carolina and Fayetteville became part of NC 22. The southern terminus was moved to the east by 1929, instead ending at US 74/NC 20 near Delco. The highway replaced 33 miles (53 km) of NC 231 between Delco and Elizabethtown. The former routing of NC 21 between Whiteville and Elizabethtown was renumbered as part of NC 23.

By 1935, NC 21 was completely decommissioned. The route between Delco and Fayetteville became NC 28. The NC 21 was removed from the US 401 concurrency between Fayetteville and Raleigh, and NC 13 was signed between Raleigh and Creedmoor.

== Junction list ==
County	Location	mi	km	Destinations	Notes
Columbus		0.00	0.00	US 17 / NC 20 – Whiteville, Wilmington	Southern terminus
Bladen	Elizabethtown	33.00	53.11	US 701 / NC 23 – Clarkton, Clinton	
Bladen	Dublin	42.00	67.59	NC 201 west – Lumberton	
Bladen		54.00	86.90	NC 220 west – St. Pauls	
Cumberland		71.4	114.9	NC 22 south – St. Pauls, Lumberton	Southern end of the NC 22 overlap
Cumberland	Fayetteville	72.4	116.5	US 401 / NC 22 / NC 24 / NC 53 – Raeford, Clinton, Sanford	Southern end of the US 401 overlap; Northern end of the NC 22 overlap
Cumberland		88.4	142.3	NC 217 east – Erwin	
Harnett	Lillington	99.4	160.0	US 421 north / NC 60 west / NC 210 south – Sanford	Northern end of the US 421 overlap; Southern end of the NC 210 overlap; Western end of the NC 60 overlap
Harnett		101	163	US 421 south / NC 60 east / NC 210 north – Erwin, Smithfield	Southern end of the US 421 overlap; Northern end of the NC 210 overlap;Eastern end of the NC 60 overlap
Wake	Varina	115	185	NC 55 north – Apex	Northern end of the NC 55 overlap
Wake		117	188	NC 55 south – Erwin	Southern end of the NC 55 overlap
Wake	Raleigh	132	212	US 70 / NC 10 – Garner, Morrisville	
Wake	Raleigh	132.8	213.7	US 1 south / US 64 west / NC 90 west – Cary, Apex	Southern end of the US 1 overlap; Western end of the US 64/NC 90 overlap
Wake	Raleigh	132.9	213.9	US 1 north / US 64 east / US 401 end / NC 90 east – Wendell, Wake Forest	Northern end of the US 1/US 401 overlap; Eastern end of the US 64/NC 90 overlap
Wake		138.9	223.5	NC 9 – Durham	
Wake		149.9	241.2	NC 91 – Durham, Wake Forest	
Granville	Creedmoor	159.9	257.3	NC 56 east – Wilton, Franklinton	Eastern end of the NC 56 overlap
Granville	Creedmoor	160.1	257.7	US 15 / NC 56 end / NC 75 – Durham, Oxford	Northern terminus; Western end of the NC 56 overlap
1.000 mi = 1.609 km; 1.000 km = 0.621 mi: Concurrency terminus
