= North Carolina Highway 53 =

State highway in North Carolina, US

North Carolina Highway 53

Route information
- Maintained by NCDOT
- Length: 126.5 mi (203.6 km)
- Existed: 1923–present

Major junctions
- West end: NC 24 / NC 210 in Fayetteville
- I-95 in Fayetteville; US 701 in White Lake; US 421 in Currie; US 117 in Burgaw; I-40 in Burgaw
- East end: Gum Branch Road in Jacksonville

Location
- Country: United States
- State: North Carolina
- Counties: Cumberland, Bladen, Pender, Onslow

Highway system
- North Carolina Highway System; Interstate; US; State; Scenic
← US 52	→ NC 54

North Carolina Highway 53 (NC 53) is a 126-mile-long (203 km) primary state highway in the U.S. state of North Carolina that mainly runs west–east in the eastern part of the state.

== Route description ==
The highway begins near Fayetteville in Cumberland County. It runs through mostly rural areas in Bladen County, Pender County, and Onslow County before emerging near Jacksonville.

The NCDOT extended the highway in August 2010 along the NC 24 bypass around the southern side of the city, then continuing onto Western Boulevard. This thoroughfare consists of the most commercially used area in the city. It was done to facilitate ease of obtaining future funding to maintain the roadway there.

== History ==
NC 53 was created in 1923 as a new state route. It ran from NC 50 (where the old US 1, US 15/US 501/NC 87 split is) to Pittsboro. In 1924 NC 53 was extended to Sanford then replaced NC 241 then went down current NC 24 into Fayetteville. In 1928 NC 53 was truncated to Sanford. In 1933 NC 53 was extended to US 701, NC 41, NC 201 in Elizabethtown. In 1934 NC 53 was extended along the entire routing of NC 201 to Jacksonville. Also in 1934 NC 53 was truncated to NC 24 in Fayetteville. In 2010 NC 53 was extended around the NC 24 bypass in Jacksonville to Gum Branch Road where its current terminus is.

=== North Carolina Highway 601 ===
North Carolina Highway 601
- Location: Jacksonville–Atkinson
- Existed: 1929–1932

NC 601 originally ran from NC 60 (current US 421) to NC 40 in Burgaw. In 1930 NC 601 was extended west to Atkinson. The same year NC 601 was extended to NC 24 in Jacksonville. In 1932 NC 601 was renumbered as part of NC 201. Today it is part of NC 53.

== Major intersections ==
County	Location	mi	km	Destinations	Notes
Cumberland	Fayetteville	0.0	0.0	NC 24 / NC 210 north (Grove Street)	Western end of NC 210 concurrency
Cumberland	Fayetteville	3.5– 3.7	5.6– 6.0	I-95 – Lumberton, Benson	Exit 49 (I-95)
Cumberland		6.7	10.8	NC 210 south – Moores Creek	Eastern end of NC 210 concurrency
Bladen		34.5	55.5	NC 242 north – Jones Lake State Park	Western end of NC 242 concurrency
Bladen	Sutton's Corner	34.6	55.7	US 701 south / NC 41 south / NC 242 south – Elizabethtown	Eastern end of NC 242 concurrency; Western end of US 701 / NC 41 concurrency
Bladen	White Lake	38.6	62.1	US 701 north / NC 41 north – White Lake	Eastern end of US 701 / NC 41 concurrency
Bladen		60.0	96.6	NC 210 north – Fayetteville	Western end of NC 210 concurrency
Bladen	Colly	60.7	97.7	NC 210 south – Moores Creek, Hampstead, Acme	Eastern end of NC 210 concurrency
Bladen		64.3	103.5	NC 11 south – Freeman	Western end of NC 11 concurrency
Pender	Ward's Corner	74.5	119.9	US 421 / NC 11 north – Wilmington, Clinton	Eastern end of NC 11 concurrency
Pender	Burgaw	83.1	133.7	US 117 Bus. south (Walker Street) / Wilmington Street	Western end of US 117 Bus. concurrency
Pender	Burgaw	83.5	134.4	US 117 Bus. north (Timerly Lane)	Eastern end of US 117 Bus. concurrency
Pender	Burgaw	83.8	134.9	US 117 – Wallace, Wilmington	
Pender		85.3– 85.5	137.3– 137.6	I-40 – Wilmington, Benson	Exit 398 (I-40)
Pender	Maple Hill	98.6	158.7	NC 50 – Chinquapin, Holly Ridge, Topsail Island	
Onslow		114.0	183.5	US 258 / NC 24 west / NC 24 Bus. east (Richlands Highway) – Richlands, Kinston, Jacksonville	Western end of NC 24 concurrency; Western terminus of NC 24 Bus.
Onslow	Jacksonville	114.7– 115.1	184.6– 185.2	US 17 Bus. (Wilmington Highway) to US 17 south – Jacksonville, Wilmington	Interchange
Onslow	Jacksonville	115.6	186.0	US 17 south – Wilmington	Interchange; Western end of US 17 concurrency; eastbound entrance / westbound exit only
Onslow	Jacksonville	118.3	190.4	Montford Point Road	Interchange; eastbound exit / westbound entrance only
Onslow	Jacksonville	118.7	191.0	US 17 north – New Bern	Interchange; Eastern end of US 17 concurrency; eastbound exit / westbound entrance only
Onslow	Jacksonville	119.3– 119.6	192.0– 192.5	NC 24 Bus. west (Lejeune Boulevard) to US 17 north – New Bern, Jacksonville	Interchange; Eastern terminus of NC 24 Bus.; eastbound entrance / westbound exit only
Onslow	Jacksonville	119.7– 120.0	192.6– 193.1	Camp Lejeune	Interchange with Wilson Blvd
Onslow	Jacksonville	120.6	194.1	NC 24 east (Lejeune Boulevard) / Tarawa Boulevard – Morehead City, Camp Lejeune	Eastern end of NC 24 concurrency
Onslow	Jacksonville	123.1	198.1	US 17 (Marine Boulevard) – Wilmington, New Bern	
Onslow	Jacksonville	126.5	203.6	Gum Branch Road / Western Boulevard	
1.000 mi = 1.609 km; 1.000 km = 0.621 mi: Concurrency terminus; Incomplete access

== See also ==
- North Carolina Bicycle Route 5 - Concurrent with NC 53 from Sweet Home Church Road near White Lake to Natmore Road in Kelly
