= North Carolina Highway 24 =

State highway in North Carolina, US

North Carolina Highway 24
- NC 24 in red, business routes in blue

Route information
- Maintained by NCDOT
- Length: 279.4 mi (449.7 km)
- Existed: 1921–present
- Tourist routes: Pee Dee Valley Drive; Sandhills Scenic Drive

Major junctions
- West end: I-485 in Charlotte
- I-77 in Charlotte; I-85 in Charlotte; US 52 / NC 73 in Albemarle; I-73 / I-74 / US 220 in Biscoe; US 1 near Cameron; I-295 in Fayetteville; I-95 BL / US 301 in Fayetteville; I-95 near Fayetteville; I-40 in Warsaw; US 17 in Jacksonville
- East end: US 70 in Morehead City

Location
- Country: United States
- State: North Carolina
- Counties: Mecklenburg, Cabarrus, Stanly, Montgomery, Moore, Harnett, Cumberland, Sampson, Duplin, Onslow, Carteret

Highway system
- North Carolina Highway System; Interstate; US; State; Scenic
← US 23	→ US 25

North Carolina Highway 24 (NC 24) is the longest primary state highway in the U.S. state of North Carolina. It travels east–west between the Charlotte metropolitan area and the Crystal Coast, connecting the cities of Charlotte, Fayetteville, Jacksonville and Morehead City.

== Route description ==
Prior to the western terminus of NC 24 at Interstate 485 (I-485), the road begins as an unmarked street named W.T. Harris Boulevard at Mount Holly-Huntersville Road. The road was named for William Thomas Harris, better known as one of the founders of Harris Teeter. Along the way NC 24 provides access to I-77, U.S. Route 21 (US 21), NC 115, I-85, US 29, and NC 49. At NC 27 (Albemarle Road) NC 24 makes a sharp left turn and joins that route in a concurrency, while W.T. Harris Boulevard continues further south unmarked towards US 74.

NC 24 is both one of the longest and most concurrent routes in the state. Besides the approximately 100-mile (160 km) concurrency with NC 27 between Johnsonville and Charlotte, this route also shares long stretches of pavement with:

- US 258 between Richlands and Jacksonville (16.5 miles)
- NC 50 between Kenansville and Warsaw (7.5 miles)
- NC 87 between Fayetteville and Spout Springs (18 miles)
- Shorter concurrencies with I-40, NC 903, US 421, US 701, US 17, NC 210 (twice), NC 22, NC 109, and NC 73. It also runs briefly concurrent with US 15/US 501 in Carthage.

All told, about half of the total length of NC 24 runs concurrent with other routes.

As a route, it is designated as a "High Priority Corridor" for North Carolina, and much of it is highly traveled, providing the most direct access between Charlotte, Fayetteville and Jacksonville. It passes near or through three major Military installations (Fort Bragg, Pope Field, and Camp Lejeune), as well as Morrow Mountain State Park, Lake Tillery and the Uwharrie National Forest. Most of the route east of I-40 is at least four lanes, with sections at or near freeway grade.

Along its eastern portions, NC 24 is known as Lejeune Boulevard thru Jacksonville, Freedom Way from the Camp Lejeune Main Gate to Swansboro, Corbett Avenue through Swansboro, Cedar Point Boulevard through Cedar Point, the W. B. McLean Highway through much of central Carteret County from JCT NC 58 to its terminus in Mansfield at US 70.

== History ==
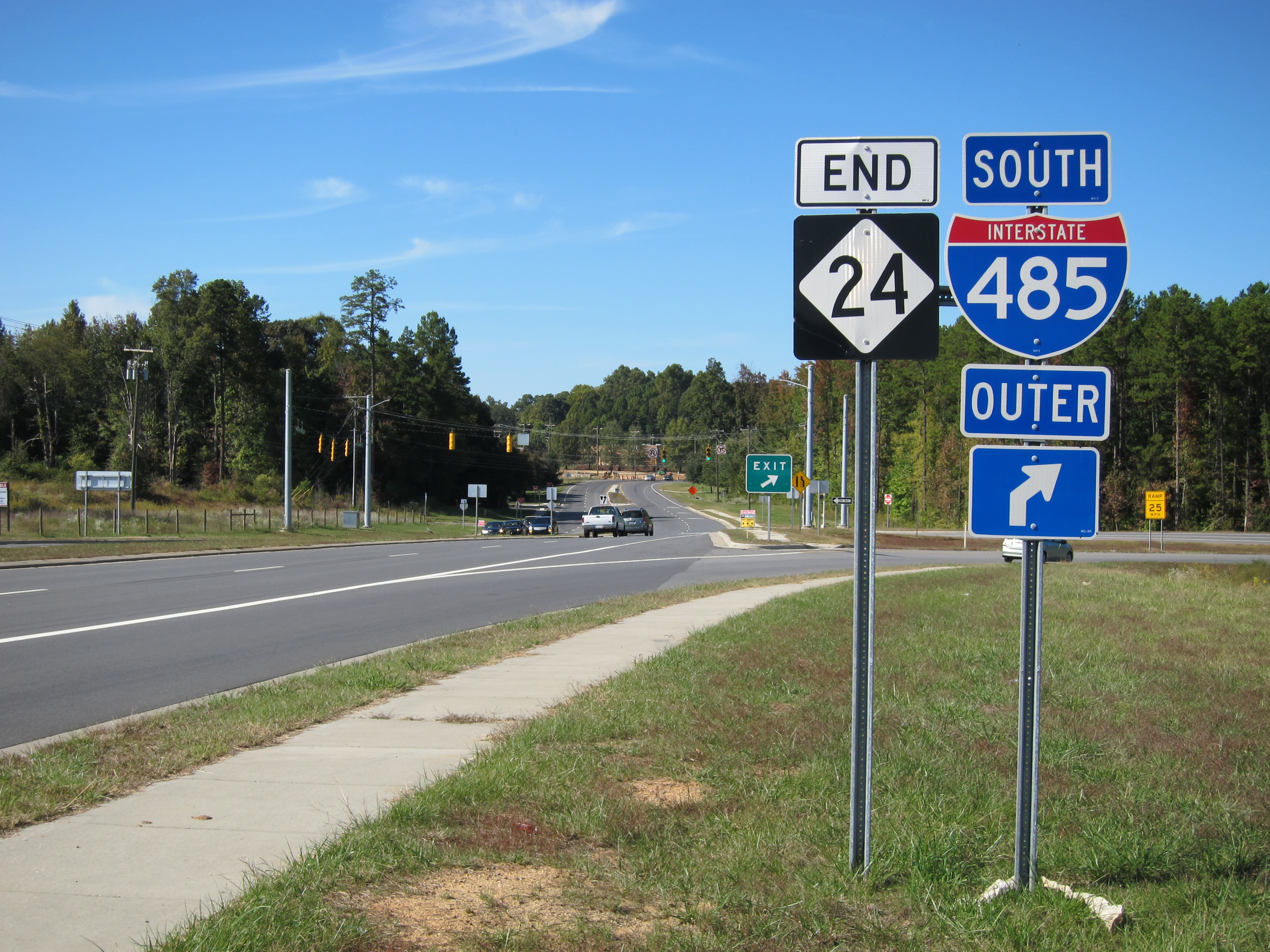
NC 24 western terminus at I-485 in Charlotte

- 1922: NC 24 runs from Warsaw to Laurinburg, through Fayetteville. Most of this routing west of Fayetteville is now US 401.
- 1925: NC 24's western terminus is extended to the South Carolina line and its eastern terminus is extended to Kenansville.
- 1930: The route is extended east to Swansboro, using part of US 17. Also, NC 24 is rerouted through Kenansville, Beaulaville, Richlands, and Jacksonville; NC 24 still uses most of this route today. Furthermore, NC 24 is given a more direct route from Laurinburg to Wagram.
- 1930s: NC 24 is rerouted numerous times after the introduction of new U.S. Highways to North Carolina.
- 1941: NC 24 west of Fayetteville is truncated; NC 87 and NC 78 take control of the truncated route.
- 1963: The western terminus of NC 24 is moved and extended to Charlotte; this produced the 106-mile (171 km) concurrency with NC 27.
- Mid 1960s: NC 24 is routed around Clinton and its routing through Fayetteville changed.
- Early 1970s: The construction of the Cape Fear River bridge at Fayetteville removed many zigzags of NC 24 in Fayetteville.
- 1982: NC 24 is routed along a four-lane bypass around Vander to access the newly built I-95.
- 2000: NC 24 is routed onto I-40 for a segment between exits 364 and 373 and onto NC 11 around Kenansville and Warsaw. The old route was signed as Business NC 24.
- 2003: NC 24 splits from NC 27 in eastern Charlotte to follow Harris Boulevard to a new western terminus at I-77.
- 2006: NC 24 is rerouted onto the Jacksonville Bypass US 17 for 4 miles (6.4 km). The old route is signed as Business Route 24.
- 2008: NC 24 western terminus is extended from I-77 to I-485 on December 8, 2008. The extension added 1 mile (1.6 km) to the route.
- 2015: NC 24 was removed with NC 87 from Bragg Blvd from the city of Spring Lake, south to the I-295, instead it was placed onto I-295 over to NC 210 then follows NC 210 north to Spring Lake.
- 2017: NC 24 was placed on a bypass of Stedman leaving behind Clinton Rd through town.
- 2018: NC 24 was placed on bypasses of Autryville and Roseboro, leaving behind NC 24 business routes.
- 2019: NC 24 was placed on a bypass around Troy, leaving behind NC 24-27 business routes.

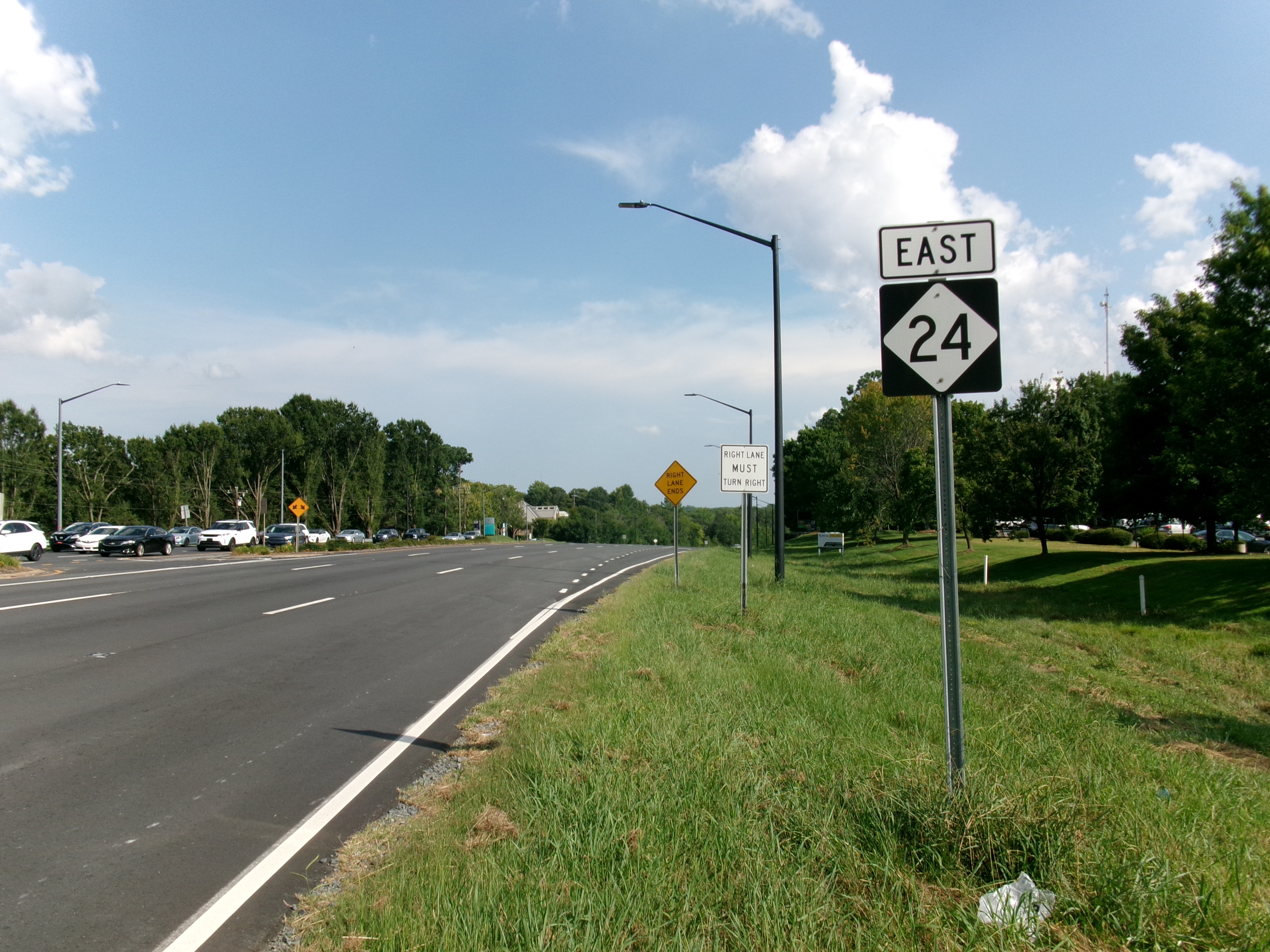
View east along NC 24 past the US 29 junction in northeast Charlotte

=== Termini ===
In March 2003, The state DOT rerouted the west end of NC 24 from US 74 to I-77 (Exit 18). This was facilitated by following Harris Boulevard in east Charlotte instead of following NC 27. This added nearly 15 miles (24 km) onto the highway's length. On December 8, 2008, Interstate 485 opened in Northwest Mecklenburg County; at that same time NC 24 was extended again by 1 mile (1.6 km) to the new freeway (Exit 21) along West WT Harris Boulevard.

Before this rerouting, NC 24 was extraneous west of Johnsonville. It was concurrent with NC 27 over its entire length to its terminus at US 74, at which point NC 27 continued while NC 24 did not.

NC 24's eastern terminus is at US 70 in Morehead City. This eastern segment leading to the terminus provides access to communities on the mainland side of the Bogue Sound.

=== North Carolina Highway 243 ===
North Carolina Highway 243
- Location: Hubert–Swansboro
- Length: 6.5 mi (10.5 km)
- Existed: 1931–1934

North Carolina Highway 243 (NC 243) appeared in 1931 as a renumbering of NC 24 from Hubert to Swansboro; which NC 24 went northeast to Stella then east towards Morehead City. In 1934, NC 243 was reverted to NC 24 when the White Oak River bridge was completed in Swansboro.

=== North Carolina Highway 605 ===
North Carolina Highway 605
- Location: Tramway–Jonesboro
- Length: 4.0 mi (6.4 km)
- Existed: 1932–1936

North Carolina Highway 605 (NC 605) was established in 1932 as a new primary route between US 1/US 15/NC 50/NC 75, in Tramway, and US 421/NC 60, in Jonesboro. In 1936, NC 24 was extended northwest from Fayetteville to Tramway, replacing NC 605.

== Major intersections ==
County	Location	mi	km	Destinations	Notes
Mecklenburg	Charlotte	0.0	0.0	I-485 – Pineville, Huntersville	Western terminus; Exit 21 on I-485
Mecklenburg	Charlotte	1.1	1.8	I-77 – Charlotte, Statesville	Exit 18 on I-77
Mecklenburg	Charlotte	1.5	2.4	US 21 (Statesville Road)	
Mecklenburg	Charlotte	2.8	4.5	NC 115 (Old Statesville Road)	
Mecklenburg	Charlotte	7.3	11.7	I-85 – Charlotte, Concord	Exit 45 (I-85)
Mecklenburg	Charlotte	8.0	12.9	US 29 (North Tryon Street)	
Mecklenburg	Charlotte	8.6	13.8	NC 49 (University City Boulevard)	To UNC Charlotte
Mecklenburg	Charlotte	9.6	15.4	Old Concord Road	
Mecklenburg	Charlotte	16.3	26.2	NC 27 west (Albemarle Road)	West end of NC 27 overlap
Mecklenburg	Mint Hill	21.1	34.0	I-485 – Pineville, Huntersville	Exit 41 (I-485)
Mecklenburg	Mint Hill	22.3	35.9	NC 51 south (Blair Road)	
Cabarrus	Midland	30.2	48.6	US 601 – Monroe, Concord	
Stanly	Locust	34.6	55.7	NC 200 – Stanfield, Monroe, Concord	
Stanly	Red Cross	38.8	62.4	NC 205 south – Oakboro	
Stanly	Albemarle	49.4	79.5	US 52 / NC 73 west (Aquadale Road) to NC 138 – Wadesboro, Salisbury	West end of NC 73 overlap
Stanly	Albemarle	49.6	79.8	US 52 Bus. (Second Street)	
Stanly	Albemarle	51.5	82.9	NC 740 north – Badin	
Stanly	Pee Dee River	57.5	92.5	James B. Garrison Bridge	
Montgomery		57.7	92.9	NC 73 east – Mount Gilead	East end of NC 73 overlap
Montgomery		65.7	105.7	NC 109 south – Mount Gilead	South end of NC 109 overlap
Montgomery	Troy	69.1	111.2	NC 109 north / NC 109 Bus. begin – Denton	North end of NC 109 and south end of NC 109 Bus overlap
Montgomery	Troy	69.6	112.0	NC 134 / NC 109 Bus. north (Main Street)	North end of NC 109 Bus overlap
Montgomery	Biscoe	76.2	122.6	US 220 Alt. (Main Street)	
Montgomery	Biscoe	77.0	123.9	I-73 / I-74 / US 220 – Rockingham, Asheboro	Exit 49 (I-73)
Moore		88.8	142.9	NC 705 – Robbins	
Moore		94.0	151.3	NC 22 north – Ramseur, Greensboro	North end of NC 22 overlap
Moore	Carthage	99.0	159.3	NC 22 south (McNeill Street)	South end of NC 22 overlap
Moore	Carthage	100.1	161.1	US 15 / US 501 south – Pinehurst, Aberdeen	South end of US 15/US 501 overlap
Moore		102.1	164.3	US 15 / US 501 north – Sanford	North end of US 15/US 501 overlap
Moore	Cameron	108.7	174.9	US 1 Bus.	
Moore		110.5	177.8	US 1 – Southern Pines, Sanford	
Harnett	Johnsonville	118.9	191.4	NC 27 east – Lillington	East end of NC 27 overlap
Harnett	Spout Springs	122.0	196.3	NC 87 north – Sanford	North end of NC 87 overlap
Cumberland	Spring Lake	128.6	207.0	NC 690 west (Vass Road) – Vass	
Cumberland	Spring Lake	130.8	210.5	NC 210 north (Lillington Highway) – Lillington	North end of NC 210 overlap
Cumberland	Spring Lake	131.3	211.3	Bragg Boulevard – Fort Bragg	Civilian traffic to close May 2016
Cumberland	Fayetteville	132.9	213.9	Honeycutt Road – Simmons AAF	
Cumberland	Fayetteville	134.7	216.8	I-295 begin (Murchison Road) / NC 210 south	North end of I-295 and south end of NC 210 overlap; exit 23 (I-295)
Cumberland	Fayetteville	136.0	218.9	I-295 end / Bragg Boulevard – Fort Bragg	South end of I-295 overlap; exit 21C (I-295)
Cumberland	Fayetteville	138.4	222.7	US 401 (Skibo Road / Pamalee Drive) – Raeford, Lillington	
Cumberland	Fayetteville	142.2	228.8	US 401 Bus. / NC 87 south (MLK Jr. Highway)	South end of NC 87 overlap
Cumberland	Fayetteville	142.6	229.5	NC 210 north (Murchison Road)	Eastbound exit and westbound entrance; north end of NC 210 overlap
Cumberland	Fayetteville	143.9	231.6	I-95 BL / US 301 (Eastern Boulevard)	
Cumberland	Fayetteville	144.6	232.7	NC 53 east / NC 210 south (Ceder Creek Road) – White Lake	South end of NC 210 overlap
Cumberland	Vander	147.4	237.2	I-95 – Lumberton, Benson	Exit 52AB (I-95); cloverleaf interchange with collector/distributor lanes
Sampson	Roseboro	165.4	266.2	NC 242 (East Street) – Elizabethtown, Salemburg	
Sampson	Clinton	176.1	283.4	US 421 / US 701 north (Faircloth Freeway) – Dunn, Newton Grove	North end of US 421 / US 701 overlap
Sampson	Clinton	177.0	284.9	US 421 / US 701 south (Faircloth Freeway) – Wilmington, Elizabethtown	South end of US 421 / US 701 overlap
Sampson	Clinton	178.1	286.6	US 701 Bus. south (Southeast Boulevard)	South end of US 701 Bus overlap
Sampson	Clinton	178.5	287.3	US 701 Bus. north (Southeast Boulevard)	North end of US 701 Bus overlap
Duplin	Warsaw	188.7	303.7	I-40 west / NC 24 Bus. east – Benson, Warsaw	West end of I-40 overlap; exit 364 (I-40)
Duplin		193.7	311.7	US 117 – Warsaw	Exit 369 (I-40)
Duplin		197.1	317.2	I-40 east / NC 903 south – Wilmington, Magnolia	East end of I-40 and south end of NC 903 overlap; exit 373 (I-40)
Duplin		200.0	321.9	NC 11 – Kenansville	
Duplin	Kenansville	202.2	325.4	NC 50 – Kenansville, Chinquapin	
Duplin	Kenansville	203.1	326.9	NC 903 north / NC 24 Bus. east – Pink Hill, Benson, Kenansville	North end of NC 903 overlap
Duplin	Beulaville	213.1	343.0	NC 41 / NC 111 (Jackson Street) – Trenton, Wallace	
Onslow		223.7	360.0	US 258 north (Kinston Highway) – Kinston	North end of US 258 overlap
Onslow	Catherine Lake	232.3	373.9	NC 111 north (Catherine Lake Road) – Chinquapin, Wallace	Southern terminus of NC 111
Onslow	Jacksonville	237.3	381.9	US 258 south (NC 24 Bus.) / NC 53 west – Burgaw, Jacksonville Downtown	South end of US 258 and west end of NC 53 (hidden) overlap
Onslow	Jacksonville	238.4	383.7	US 17 south (US 17 Bus.) – Wilmington	South end of US 17 overlap
Onslow	Jacksonville	241.9	389.3	Montford Landing Road	Eastbound entrance and westbound exit
Onslow	Jacksonville	242.5	390.3	US 17 north (NC 24 Bus.) – New Bern, Jacksonville Downtown	North end of US 17 overlap
Onslow	Jacksonville	243.2	391.4	Wilson Boulevard – Camp Lejeune	
Onslow	Jacksonville	233.9	376.4	NC 53 east (Western Boulevard)	East end of NC 53 (hidden) overlap
Onslow	Jacksonville	246.2	396.2	Camp Lejeune Main Gate	
Onslow	Hubert	252.8	406.8	NC 172 south	Northern terminus of NC 172
Carteret	Cape Carteret	263.2	423.6	NC 58 – Emerald Isle, Trenton	
Carteret	Morehead City	279.4	449.7	US 70 (Arendell Street) – Havelock, Beaufort	Eastern terminus
1.000 mi = 1.609 km; 1.000 km = 0.621 mi: Concurrency terminus; Incomplete access

== Special routes ==
=== Troy business loop ===
North Carolina Highway 24 Business
- Location: Troy
- Length: 3.7 mi (6.0 km)
- Existed: 2019–present

North Carolina Highway 24 Business (NC 24 Bus) was established in 2019 when mainline NC 24, along with NC 27, was rerouted onto new routing bypassing south of Troy.

=== Autryville business loop ===
North Carolina Highway 24 Business
- Location: Autryville
- Length: 1.7 mi (2.7 km)
- Existed: 2018–present

North Carolina Highway 24 Business (NC 24 Bus) was established in 2018 when mainline NC 24 was rerouted onto new routing bypassing north of Autryville. The 1.7-mile (2.7 km) business route follows the original alignment of NC 24 along Clinton Road, Williams Street, and Autry Highway.

=== Warsaw–Kenansville business loop ===
North Carolina Highway 24 Business
- Location: Warsaw–Kenansville
- Length: 11.8 mi (19.0 km)
- Existed: 1999–present

North Carolina Highway 24 Business (NC 24 Bus) was established in March, 1999 when mainline NC 24 was rerouted overlapping I-40 and NC 903 (Kenansville Bypass); the old alignment through downtown Warsaw and Kenansville was redesignated as a business loop.

=== Jacksonville business loop ===
North Carolina Highway 24 Business
- Location: Jacksonville
- Length: 4.3 mi (6.9 km)
- Existed: 2006–present

North Carolina Highway 24 Business (NC 24 Bus) was established in January 2008 when mainline NC 24 was placed on new bypass south of Jacksonville. The business loop follows the old alignment through downtown Jacksonville, via Richlands Highway (in concurrency with US 258), Marine Boulevard (in concurrency with US 17 Business), Johnson Boulevard and Lejeune Boulevard.

== See also ==
- North Carolina Bicycle Route 6 - Concurrent with NC 24 briefly east and west of Albemarle
