= Bradham =

Bradham is a surname. Notable people with the surname include:

- Caleb Bradham (1867–1934), American pharmacist and founder of PepsiCo
- Nigel Bradham (born 1989), American football player

== See also ==
- Slover-Bradham House
