= North Carolina Highway 50 =

State highway in North Carolina, US

North Carolina Highway 50

- Route of NC 50 highlighted in red

Route information
- Maintained by NCDOT
- Length: 164.2 mi (264.3 km)
- Existed: 1935–present

Major junctions
- South end: Florida Avenue in Topsail Beach
- US 17 in Holly Ridge; US 117 in Warsaw; US 13 / US 701 in Newton Grove; I-40 in Newton Grove; I-95 / NC 242 in Benson; US 301 / NC 27 / NC 242 in Benson; US 70 / US 401 in Garner; I-40 / US 64 in Raleigh; I-440 / US 1 in Raleigh; I-540 near Raleigh
- North end: US 15 / NC 56 in Creedmoor

Location
- Country: United States
- State: North Carolina
- Counties: Pender, Onslow, Duplin, Wayne, Sampson, Johnston, Wake, Granville

Highway system
- North Carolina Highway System; Interstate; US; State; Scenic
← NC 49	→ NC 51

North Carolina Highway 50 (NC 50) is a primary state highway in the U.S. state of North Carolina. It goes from Topsail Beach in the south to Creedmoor in the north, connecting the cities of Warsaw, Newton Grove, Benson, and Raleigh.

== Route description ==
From the Coast to the Triangle area, NC 50 serves to directly link several cities in the Cape Fear region to the Research Triangle and North Carolina State Capitol. However, because it parallels I-40 along the majority of its route, the highway is typically relegated to local traffic except at its southern end.

=== Cape Fear region ===
The highway begins at Florida Avenue (SR 1555), in Topsail Beach, and goes northeast through the southern half of Topsail Island to Surf City, where it crosses over the Intracoastal Waterway and onto the mainland, in concurrency with NC 210. Entering Onslow County, it connects with US 17 at Holly Ridge. Entering back into Pender County, it crosses NC 53 at Maple Hill and skirts nearby Angola Bay State Game Land. In an event of emergency, NC 50 is designated and signed as an evacuation route for the coastal area. On Topsail Island, the highway is flanked predominantly by houses, with some view to Onslow Bay. Bicycle lanes also flank the highway in and around Surf City. North of Holly Ridge, the highway traverses through the Holly Shelter Swamp, Great Sandy Run Pocosin and Angola Swamp; most of which drains into the Cape Fear River.

With a brief overlap with NC 41 at Chinquapin, NC 50 goes northwest to Kenansville, where it overlaps with NC 24 Business and begins its parallel with I-40. Continuing northwest, it connects with Warsaw and switches concurrency with US 117 to Faison. Continuing solo till Dobbersville, where it overlaps with NC 55, it goes west into Newton Grove then splits with NC 55 after crossing I-40 to go northwest again. At Benson, it overlaps briefly with both NC 242 and NC 27. Taking a more northerly direction now, it eventually enters Wake County, having an interchange with NC 540 before passing by Lake Benson and into Garner, where it begins its overlap with US 70.

The route is predominantly surrounded by farmland with the occasional city, where farmers bring their products to market. At McGee Crossroads and continuing northward, the farmland gives way to sleeper communities for the Raleigh area.

=== Raleigh vicinity ===
The majority of the highway's route is concurrent with US 70 and to a lesser extent with US 401. At Garner, the highway continues northwest to Fayetteville Road (US 401), then goes north as Wilmington Street and later Saunders Street before crossing the Raleigh Beltline (I-40/US 64). As it nears Martin Luther King Jr. Boulevard, the highway splits into northbound McDowell and southbound Dawson streets. At the city center, is passes by the Raleigh Convention Center, Depot Historic District, Nash Square, and a block from the State Capital, Legislative Building and the North Carolina Museum of Natural Sciences.

Leaving north from the city center, the highway's north and southbound lanes merge back together forming Capital Boulevard, which is squeezed between two rail-yards. Exiting from Capital Boulevard (US 401), it briefly overlaps Wade Avenue before connecting onto Glenwood Avenue. Continuing northwest again, it crosses the Raleigh Beltline (I-440/US 1) and enters Midtown Raleigh area. Near the Crabtree Valley Mall, NC 50 splits from US 70 and continues north along Creedmoor Road.

After crossing the Northern Wake Expressway (I-540), NC 50 leaves the Raleigh city limits. Crossing over the Neuse River, inside the Falls Lake State Recreation Area, it soon enters rural Granville County. At Creedmoor, NC 50 goes through the city center and connects with NC 56, before promptly ending .2 miles (0.32 km) later at US 15.

The highway throughout this area is typically four or more lanes with mostly commercial sites along its route.

=== Dedicated and memorial names ===
NC 50 features at least one dedicated or memorialized stretch along its route.

- Earl "Easy" Creech, Jr. BridgeOfficial North Carolina name of bridge over Interstate 95.

== History ==
Established in 1935 as a renumbering of NC 221, the second and current NC 50 traversed from Newton Grove to Coats, through Benson. In 1937, NC 50 was rerouted on new primary routing north from Benson to US 70, in Garner; its old alignment to Coats was replaced by NC 40.

In 1952, NC 50 was extended through Newton Grove to Dobbersville, overlapping with NC 55, then going southeast on a new primary routing to Faison. In 1953, its northern terminus was clipped .3 miles (0.48 km) from Garner Road (SR 1004) to a new routing of US 70. Between 1956-1958, NC 50 was extended south to its current southern terminus in Topsail Beach; extending south along US 117 to Warsaw, then along NC 24 to Kenansville, then on new primary routing southeast to the coast, with short overlaps with NC 41 and NC 210. In 1957, NC 50 was extended north to its current northern terminus in Creedmoor; overlapping west along US 70 through Raleigh, then replacing US 15A north to Creedmoor.

In 1967, northbound US 70/US 401/NC 50 was adjusted around Wilmington Street and South Street, in downtown Raleigh. In 1972, US 70/NC 50 was rerouted from Glenwood Avenue (downgraded to secondary road) to stay along Capital Boulevard then go west along the Raleigh Beltway back to Glenwood Avenue. In 1984, US 70/US 401/NC 50 were taken off downtown Raleigh streets and was rerouted going counter-clockwise along the Raleigh Beltway. In 1991, NC 50, and US 70/US 401, returned to downtown Raleigh; routed along Saunders Street, Dawson/McDowell Streets and Connector, Capital Boulevard, Wade Avenue and finally Glenwood Avenue.

The first NC 50 was an original state highway that ran from the South Carolina state line north through Rockingham, Aberdeen, Southern Pines, Sanford, Raleigh, Wake Forest, Henderson, Warrenton and finally Roanoke Rapids, ending at NC 4] (Weldon Road). In 1923, the section between Norlina and Roanoke Rapids was renumbered to NC 48; NC 50 was then rerouted north to Virginia. In 1925, NC 50 replaced part of NC 204 at Marston. In 1926, US 1 was established through the state and was routed entirely along NC 50. In 1934, NC 50 was decommissioned in favor of US 1.

=== North Carolina Highway 13 (1934–1935) ===
North Carolina Highway 13
- Location: Raleigh–Creedmoor
- Length: 24 mi (39 km)
- Existed: 1934–1935

North Carolina Highway 13 (NC 13) was a short primary state highway in the U.S. state of North Carolina. it ran from Raleigh to US 15 in Creedmoor. In 1934 the entirety of NC 21 was renumbered to avoid confusion with US 21 to the west. NC 13 is shown on the 1935 state highway map running north from Raleigh to NC 9 southeast of Leesville. The highway then traveled north intersecting NC 91 and crossing the Neuse River before ending at US 15/NC 56 in Creedmoor. The 1936 state highway map shows NC 13 completely renumbered as US 15A.

=== North Carolina Highway 221 ===
North Carolina Highway 221
- Location: Newton Grove–Coats
- Length: 21.2 mi (34.1 km)
- Existed: 1934–1935

North Carolina Highway 221 (NC 221) was established as a new primary routing from NC 102/NC 117, in Newton Grove, through Benson, to NC 55, in Coats. By the end of 1934 or early 1935, NC 221 was quickly renumbered as NC 50.

== Major intersections ==
County	Location	mi	km	Destinations	Notes
Pender	Topsail Beach	0.0	0.0	Florida Avenue	
Pender	Surf City	7.6	12.2	NC 210 east (New River Drive) – North Topsail Beach	East end of NC 210 overlap
Pender	Surf City	9.5	15.3	NC 210 west – Hampstead	West end of NC 210 overlap
Onslow	Holly Ridge	12.8	20.6	US 17 – Wilmington, Jacksonville	
Pender	Maple Hill	31.3	50.4	NC 53 – Burgaw, Jacksonville	
Duplin	Chinquapin	44.9	72.3	NC 41 east – Beulaville	East end of NC 41 overlap
Duplin		46.8	75.3	NC 41 west – Wallace	West end of NC 41 overlap
Duplin	Kenansville	58.1	93.5	NC 24 / NC 903 (Kenansville Bypass) – Magnolia, La Grange	
Duplin	Kenansville	59.1	95.1	NC 11 north (Main Street) / NC 24 Bus. east – Kinston, Jacksonville	North end of NC 11, East end of NC 24 Bus overlap
Duplin	Kenansville	59.6	95.9	NC 11 south (Magnolia Extension) – Wallace	South end of NC 11 overlap
Duplin	Warsaw	66.7	107.3	NC 24 Bus. west (College Street) – Clinton	West end of NC 24 Bus overlap
Duplin	Warsaw	67.5	108.6	US 117 south (Pine Street) – Wallace	South end of US 117 overlap
Duplin	Faison	75.5	121.5	US 117 north (Center Street) / NC 403 north (Main Street) – Goldsboro	North end of US-117 overlap, East end of NC 403 overlap
Duplin	Faison	76.2	122.6	NC 403 south – Clinton	West end of NC 403 overlap
Duplin		77.1	124.1	US 117 Conn. – Clinton, Mount Olive, Goldsboro	
Wayne	Dobbersville	86.6	139.4	NC 55 east – Mount Olive	East end of NC 55 overlap
Sampson	Newton Grove	93.2	150.0	US 13 (Fayetteville Highway) / US 701 (Main/Clinton Streets) – Goldsboro, Smithfield, Fayetteville, Clinton	Roundabout
Sampson	Newton Grove	94.5	152.1	I-40 – Benson, Wilmington	I-40 exit 341, Diamond interchange
Sampson	Newton Grove	94.8	152.6	NC 55 west (Harnett-Dunn Highway) – Dunn	West end of NC 55 overlap
Johnston	Peacocks Crossroads	101.5	163.3	NC 96 – Smithfield	
Johnston	Benson	107.8	173.5	NC 242 south (Walton Avenue) – Salemburg	South end of NC 242 overlap
Johnston	Benson	107.9	173.6	I-95 – Smithfield, Dunn	I-95 exit 79, Diamond Interchange
Johnston	Benson	108.5	174.6	US 301 / NC 27 / NC 242 north (Wall Street) – Dunn, Four Oaks	Eastern Terminus of NC 27, East end of NC 27, North end of NC 242 overlap
Johnston	Benson	109.1	175.6	NC 27 west (Main Street) – Coats	West end of NC 27 overlap
Johnston	McGee Crossroads	118.7	191.0	NC 210 – Angier, Smithfield	
Johnston		124.4	200.2	NC 36 east / NC 42 west – Fuquay-Varina, Clayton	
Wake		126.6	203.7	NC 540 Toll	Interchange
Wake	Garner	132.7	213.6	US 70 east – Clayton	East end of US 70 overlap, Interchange
Wake	Garner	133.3	214.5	Vandora Springs Road	Interchange
Wake	Garner	135.3	217.7	US 401 south – Fuquay-Varina, Fayetteville	Interchange, Southbound Exit, Northbound Entrance, South end of US 401 overlap
Wake	Raleigh	136.3	219.4	Wilmington Street – Downtown Raleigh	Interchange, Northbound Exit, Southbound Entrance,
Wake	Raleigh	137.1	220.6	I-40 / US 64 – Cary, Chapel Hill, Benson	I-40 Exit 298, Interchange
Wake	Raleigh	138.2	222.4	Martin Luther King Jr Boulevard / Western Boulevard	Interchange
Wake	Raleigh	139.7	224.8	Peace Street	Interchange
Wake	Raleigh	140.2	225.6	US 401 north (Capital Boulevard) – Wake Forest, Louisburg	North end of US 401 overlap; Trumpet Interchange
Wake	Raleigh	140.5	226.1	Wade Avenue/Glenwood Avenue	Interchange
Wake	Raleigh	143.6	231.1	I-440 / US 1 – Sanford, Rocky Mount, Wake Forest, Wilson	I-440, exit 7; Interchange
Wake	Raleigh	144.5	232.6	US 70 west (Glenwood Avenue) – Durham	West end of US 70 overlap
Wake	Raleigh	149.4	240.4	I-540 – Wake Forest, Durham, RDU Airport	I-540, exit 9, Interchange
Wake		154.5	248.6	NC 98 (Durham Road) – Durham, Wake Forest	Interchange
Granville	Creedmoor	164.0	263.9	NC 56 east – Franklinton, Louisburg	East end of NC 56 overlap
Granville	Creedmoor	164.2	264.3	US 15 / NC 56 west (Durham Avenue) – Durham, Oxford	West end of NC 56 overlap
1.000 mi = 1.609 km; 1.000 km = 0.621 mi: Concurrency terminus; Incomplete access
