= North Carolina Highway 210 =

State highway in North Carolina, US

North Carolina Highway 210
- NC 210 highlighted in red

Route information
- Maintained by NCDOT
- Length: 191.8 mi (308.7 km)
- Existed: 1931–present

Major junctions
- From: US 17 near Sneads Ferry
- US 17 in Hampstead; I-40 near Burgaw; US 117 near St. Helena; US 421 near St. Helena; I-95 in Fayetteville; I-95 BL / US 301 in Fayetteville; I-295 in Fayetteville; US 401 / US 421 in Lillington; I-40 near Angier
- To: US 70 Bus. in Smithfield

Location
- Country: United States
- State: North Carolina
- Counties: Onslow, Pender, Bladen, Cumberland, Harnett, Johnston

Highway system
- North Carolina Highway System; Interstate; US; State; Scenic
← NC 209	→ NC 211

North Carolina Highway 210 (NC 210) is a 192-mile-long (309 km) primary state highway in the U.S. state of North Carolina that connects settlements in the Atlantic Coastal Plain region. Due to its meandering route NC 210 changes directional orientation twice, changing from east-west to north-south at Old Stage Road east of Angier, then changing from north-south to west-east at the Bladen–Pender county line. The route traverses through central Fayetteville and the Fort Bragg Army installation and crosses both Topsail Island access bridges over the Atlantic Intracoastal Waterway. Owing primarily to its meandering route, NC 210 is the sixth longest state highway in North Carolina.

== Route description ==
=== Sneads Ferry to Bladen County ===
NC 210 begins in Onslow County, northwest of the unincorporated community of Sneads Ferry, at US 17. Signed west here, the road actually heads in a southeasterly direction through a commercial district west of Sneads Ferry, crossing NC 172. The route become Island Drive as it crosses a bridge over the Atlantic Intracoastal Waterway and turns southwest along Topsail Island, forming the main road along the narrow barrier island and passing through several resort communities. In Surf City, it merges with NC 50 to cross the Intracoastal Waterway again, traveling northward though Surf City before splitting off to the west. Near the Holly Shelter Game Preserve it merges with US 17 and travels southwest towards the unincorporated community of Hampstead, where it leaves to the west and takes a winding path towards an interchange with I-40 in the Pender County community of Rocky Point. Following a winding path eastwards through several rural, unincorporated communities, it crosses US 421 and has a brief concurrency with NC 53 before turning due north and changing designations from east-west to north-south before entering Bladen County.

=== Bladen County to Johnston County ===
NC 210 continues as a primarily rural route northbound through Bladen County, turning to the northwest as it enters Sampson County near the unincorporated community of Ivanhoe. After it crosses US 701 south of the town of Garland it passes to the east of Bladen Lakes State Forest and continues northwest towards Fayetteville, merging with NC 53 just outside of the unincorporated community of Judson. Upon entering Fayetteville, NC 53 ends, and NC 210 joins with NC 24 to form a concurrency along Grove Street. In Downtown Fayetteville, NC 210 leaves along Murchison Road to the northwest, merges again with NC 24 after crossing the NC 295 freeway, and the two routes continue on northwards into the town of Spring Lake along Bragg Boulevard. At the center of Spring Lake, NC 210 splits off to the northeast and crosses into Harnett County near the community of Anderson Creek. After merging with US 401 in the community of Shawtown, the two routes merge with US 421 to cross the Cape Fear River in Lillington. In the north of Lillington, both US routes leave in opposite directions and NC 210 continues northwards towards Angier. In Angier, the route turns again, this time changing designation to west-east.

=== Johnston County ===
Continuing into Johnston County heading eastbound, NC 210 forms the primary road through the community of McGee's Crossroads, located between NC 50 and I-40 along NC 210. After leaving the McGee's Crossroads area, the route continues eastbound through a mostly rural area, before reaching its terminus in West Smithfield at US 70 Business.

== History ==
=== Previous designations ===
North Carolina Highway 210
- Location: Paint Rock–Tennessee state line
- Existed: 1924–1926

NC 210 first appeared on North Carolina state transportation maps in 1924, running from NC 20 south of Paint Rock to the North Carolina-Tennessee state line. From NC 20, the highway continued to the northeast along modern-day Paint Rock Road, passing through the community. It crossed the French Broad River at Paint Rock and intersected another road on its northern bank. At the intersection, NC 210 turned to the northwest and followed the road to the Tennessee state line. For the duration of its existence, NC 210 was an unimproved road. The highway continued to appear on maps until 1926 when the designation was removed. The route continued as secondary roads, however, Paint Rock Road no longer crosses the French Broad River.

North Carolina Highway 210
- Location: Erwin–Cardenas, NC
- Length: 20 mi (32 km)
- Existed: 1929–1931

The second designation of NC 210 first appeared on North Carolina state transportation maps in 1929. NC 210 ran 20 miles (32 km) from NC 60 in Erwin to NC 21 in Cardenas. From its southern terminus, the highway ran in a northerly and northwesterly direction through Coats and Angier until reaching NC 21 in Cardenas, located northeast of Fuquay Varina. By 1931, NC 210 was renumbered as an extension of NC 55.

=== Current designation ===
The current designation of NC 210 first appeared on North Carolina state transportation maps in 1931, running 51 miles (82 km) from NC 53 in Manchester to US 70 west of Smithfield. NC 210 connected Fort Bragg to Lillington, Angier, and Smithfield in Cumberland County, Harnett County, and Johnston County. At the time of designation, the route between Manchester and the Harnett County-Johnston County line was a gravel, sand, or topsoil road. NC 210 in Johnston County was a graded road. By 1935, a section of NC 210 between Manchester and Angier was paved. The remaining route between Angier and US 70 was classified as a gravel, sand-clay, or topsoil road. A portion of the route in Johnston County, along the eastern segment of the highway was paved by 1936. The remaining route east of Angier was paved by 1940.

In 1942, NC 210 was extended south from Manchester to Fayetteville. The highway ran concurrently with NC 87 for 2 miles (3.2 km) before proceeding southeast toward Fayetteville. By 1946, NC 210 was routed south of Manchester along the modern-day Lillington Highway. The rerouted shortened the concurrency with NC 87 north of Fayetteville. The former route is now a secondary road known as Manchester Road. NC 210 was extended southeast from Fayetteville to US 421 near Currie in 1952. From Fayetteville, NC 210 ran concurrently with US 301/NC 24 to NC 53. NC 210 and NC 53 ran concurrently to the southeast for 9 miles (14 km) until diverged to the east along its own routing. The new routing closely followed the South River until once again reaching NC 53 east of Kelly. NC 210 and NC 53 followed a 1 mile (1.6 km) concurrency to the east, before NC 210 diverged to the southeast to US 421. US 421 was placed onto its current routing between NC 210 and Wilmington in 1954. NC 210 was extended to follow the former routing, extending the highway southeast to US 117 in Castle Hayne. By 1957, NC 210 was rerouted beginning at Bells Crossroads, following its current routing through Rocky Point to Hampstead. In Hampstead, NC 210 turned to run concurrently with US 17 for 9 miles (14 km) until turning to the southeast toward Surf City. NC 210 met NC 50 3 miles (4.8 km) to the southeast where it ran concurrently with NC 50 to Surf City. In Surf City, NC 210 was routed to run 13 miles (21 km) northeast to the New River inlet. In September 1969, NC 210 was rerouted 9 miles (14 km) north of Surf City to cross the Intracoastal Waterway and ran 8 miles (13 km) northwest to US 17 in Dixon.

NC 210 was placed along a realignment roadway near Anderson Creek in Harnett County in November 1971. The former alignment became Anderson Creek School Road. In 1975, NC 210 was rerouted in Fayetteville to continue along Grove Street along a new bridge crossing the Cape Fear River until reaching NC 53. The realignment ended the US 301 concurrency in Fayetteville. NC 210 was realigned near Currie on January 29, 1988, removing NC 210 from Brinson Road. NC 210 was extended northeast along Malpass Crossroads Road to an intersection with Bell Williams Road, where it turned to follow Bell Williams Road to the east.

== Junction list ==
County	Location	mi	km	Destinations	Notes
Johnston	Smithfield	0.0	0.0	US 70 Bus. (West Market Street) – Smithfield, Raleigh	
Johnston	McGee's Crossroads	12.3– 12.5	19.8– 20.1	I-40 – Raleigh, Benson	I-40 Exit 319
Johnston	McGee's Crossroads	13.7	22.0	NC 50 – Benson, Raleigh	
Harnett		20.1	32.3	Route transition from westbound to southbound at Old Stage Road	
Harnett	Angier	23.1	37.2	NC 55 (Raleigh Street) – Fuquay-Varina, Coats	
Harnett	Lillington	30.7	49.4	US 401 north / US 421 south / NC 27 east (Cornelius Harnett Boulevard) – Erwin, Dunn, Raleigh	North end of US 401, south end of US 421 and east end of NC 27 overlaps
Harnett	Lillington	32.2	51.8	US 421 north (West Front Street) – Sanford	North end of US 421 overlap
Harnett	Lillington	32.7	52.6	NC 27 west (West Old Street)	West end of NC 27 overlap
Harnett	Lillington	32.8	52.8	US 401 south – Fayetteville	South end of US 401 overlap
Cumberland	Spring Lake	50.8	81.8	NC 24 west / NC 87 north – Sanford	West end of NC 24 overlap, north end of NC 87 overlap
Cumberland	Spring Lake	51.5– 52.1	82.9– 83.8	Randolph Street / Butner Road – Pope AAF	Interchange
Cumberland		52.4– 53.3	84.3– 85.8	Honeycutt Road – Simmons AAF	Interchange
Cumberland		54.3– 54.9	87.4– 88.4	I-295 north / NC 24 east / NC 87 – Fort Bragg	East end of NC 24 overlap, south end of NC 87 overlap; I-295 exit 23
Cumberland	Fayetteville	56.9	91.6	US 401 (Country Club Drive / Pamalee Drive) – Raeford, Lillington	
Cumberland	Fayetteville	59.9	96.4	NC 24 west (Rowan Street)	West end of NC 24 overlap
Cumberland	Fayetteville	61.3	98.7	I-95 BL / US 301 (Eastern Boulevard) – Hope Mills, Benson	
Cumberland	Fayetteville	62.0	99.8	NC 24 east / NC 53 begins – Clinton	East end of NC 24 overlap; west end of NC 53 overlap
Cumberland	Fayetteville	65.5– 65.7	105.4– 105.7	I-95 – Smithfield, Lumberton	I-95 exit 49
Cumberland	Stedman	68.7	110.6	NC 53 east – White Lake	East end of NC 53 overlap
Cumberland		86.5	139.2	NC 242 – Roseboro, Elizabethtown	
Bladen		97.3	156.6	US 701 – Elizabethtown, Clinton	
Bladen		102.1	164.3	NC 41 – Wallace, Elizabethtown	
Bladen		121.9	196.2	NC 53 west – White Lake, Kelly	West end of NC 53 overlap
Bladen		122.6	197.3	NC 53 east – Burgaw	East end of NC 53 overlap
Bladen		125.6	202.1	NC 11 – Burgaw, Freeman	
Bladen–Pender county line		126.2	203.1	Route transition from southbound to eastbound at county line	
Pender	Currie	137.2	220.8	US 421 – Clinton, Wilmington	
Pender	Rocky Point	143.3	230.6	NC 133 south / Clarks Landing Loop Road – Wilmington	
Pender	Rocky Point	148.2	238.5	US 117 – Wilmington, Burgaw	
Pender	Rocky Point	148.5– 148.6	239.0– 239.1	I-40 – Benson, Wilmington	I-40 exit 408
Pender	Hampstead	161.8	260.4	US 17 south / Dan Owen Drive – Wilmington	South end of US 17 overlap
Pender	Surf City	170.5	274.4	US 17 north – Jacksonville	North end of US 17 overlap
Pender	Surf City	173.3	278.9	NC 50 north / Belt Road – Holly Ridge	North end of NC 50 overlap
Pender	Surf City	175.3– 175.4	282.1– 282.3	NC 50 south (South Topsail Drive) – Topsail Beach	South end of NC 50 overlap; roundabout
Onslow	Sneads Ferry	187.7	302.1	NC 172 – Sneads Ferry, Folkstone	
Onslow	Dixon	191.8	308.7	US 17 – Jacksonville, Wilmington	
1.000 mi = 1.609 km; 1.000 km = 0.621 mi: Concurrency terminus; Route transition

== See also ==
- North Carolina Bicycle Route 3 - Concurrent with NC 210 from Island Creek Road near Hampstead to Shaw Highway near Rocky Point
- North Carolina Bicycle Route 5 - Concurrent with NC 210 from Blueberry Road in Currie to Morgan Road in Still Bluff and again on its concurrency with NC 53
