= North Carolina Highway 201 =

Former state highway in North Carolina, United States

North Carolina Highway 201 (NC 201) was the designation for two former routes in North Carolina.

== First NC 201 ==
North Carolina Highway 201
- Location: Brunswick County, North Carolina
- Existed: ?–1928

The first NC 201 was one of the original NC state routes. It ran from Belville southwest to Supply along the current U.S. Route 17 (US 17). Then it went back east to Southport. In 1928 NC 201 was renumbered NC 30 from Belville to Supply and NC 130 from Supply to Southport.

== Second NC 201 ==
North Carolina Highway 201
- Location: Southeastern North Carolina
- Existed: 1928–1934

The second NC 201 was designated in 1928 US 217/NC 22 in Lumberton to NC 21 in Dublin. In 1931 NC 201 was extended to Atkinson. Then NC 201 replaced NC 601 to Jacksonville. In 1934 NC 201 was renumbered as NC 41 from Lumberton to White Lake. The rest of the routing was renumbered as NC 53.
