= WLSE =

WLSE may refer to:

- 103.3 WLSE (FM) Canton, Illinois — a radio station first licensed in 2013
- 1400 WLSE (AM) Wallace, North Carolina — a defunct radio station that operated from 1953 to 2003
- 94.3 WZKB Wallace, North Carolina — a radio station that had the call sign WLSE-FM until 1980
