= Vander =

Vander may refer to:

== Names ==
van der, a variant of van in Dutch names

== People ==
- Christian Vander (born 1948), French musician
- Musetta Vander (born 1969), South African actress and model
- Roberto Vander, Dutch-Mexican actor and singer
- Vander Blue, American basketball player
- Vander (footballer, born 1990), full name Vander Luiz Silva Souza, Brazilian football attacking midfielder
- Vander Vieira (born 1988), Brazilian football winger
- Vander Von Odd, drag performer and winner of The Boulet Brothers' Dragula (season 1)

== Places ==
- Vander, North Carolina
