= North Carolina Highway 27 =

State highway in North Carolina, US

North Carolina Highway 27

- Route of NC 27 highlighted in red

Route information
- Maintained by NCDOT
- Length: 198.0 mi (318.7 km)
- Existed: 1922–present
- Tourist routes: Pee Dee Valley Drive; Sandhills Scenic Drive

Major junctions
- West end: NC 10 near Toluca
- US 321 in Lincolnton; I-485 in Charlotte; I-85 in Charlotte; I-77 / I-277 / US 21 / US 74 in Charlotte; US 52 / NC 73 in Albemarle; I-73 / I-74 / US 220 in Biscoe; US 15 / US 501 in Carthage; US 1 in Cameron; US 401 / US 421 / NC 210 in Lillington
- East end: US 301 / NC 50 / NC 242 in Benson

Location
- Country: United States
- State: North Carolina
- Counties: Cleveland, Lincoln, Gaston, Mecklenburg, Cabarrus, Stanly, Montgomery, Moore, Harnett, Johnston

Highway system
- North Carolina Highway System; Interstate; US; State; Scenic
← I-26	→ NC 28

North Carolina Highway 27 (NC 27) is a primary state highway in the U.S. state of North Carolina. The route traverses 198 miles (319 km) through southern and central North Carolina, about 100 miles (160 km) of it as a concurrency with NC 24.

== Route description ==
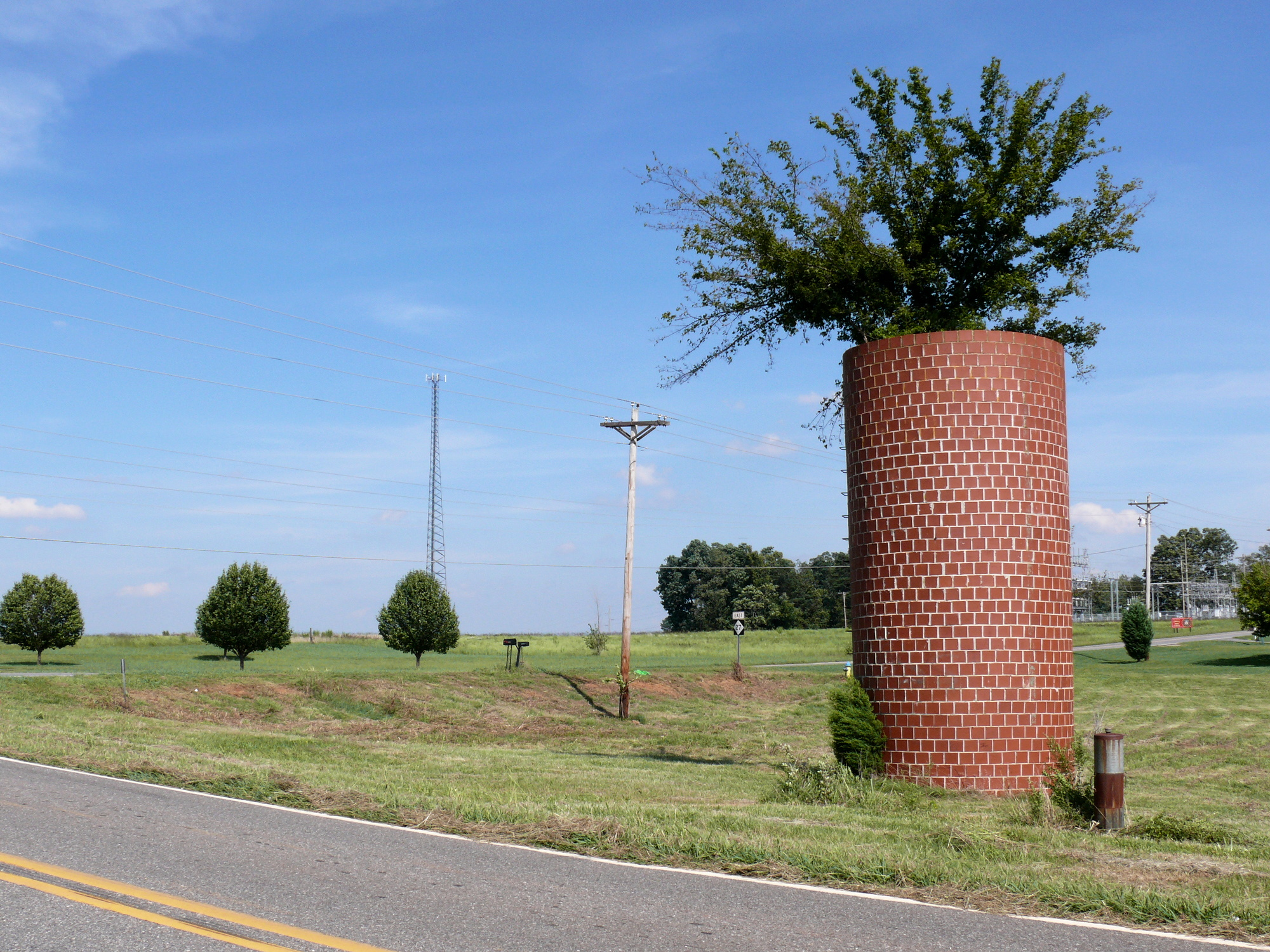
NC 27, west of Lincolnton.

NC 27 begins in Cleveland County near the unincorporated community of Toluca at a T-intersection with NC 10. From there it runs southeast to the city of Lincolnton. In Lincolnton, it serves as Main Street, and runs past the former Lincoln County courthouse. From Lincolnton, it runs southeast again to Stanley where it follows Main Street. It enters Charlotte along Mount Holly Road, and follows several major thoroughfares through Charlotte, including Freedom Drive, Morehead Street, and Independence Boulevard.

On the east side of Charlotte, it begins its 100-mile (160 km) long concurrency with NC 24, approximately 1/2 of its total length. The two highways leave the city along Albemarle Road and remain joined until the unincorporated community of Johnsonville. Along this segment, they pass through the cities of Midland, Locust, Albemarle, Troy, Biscoe, and Carthage. They share further concurrencies with NC 109, NC 22, and US 15.

From the split with NC 24, the road runs northeast to Lillington where it follows Main Street, and leaves town as a concurrency with US 421. It passes Campbell University in Buies Creek before entering Johnston County and ending in Benson just short of I-95. NC 50 continues east of NC 27's terminus at US 301.

== History ==
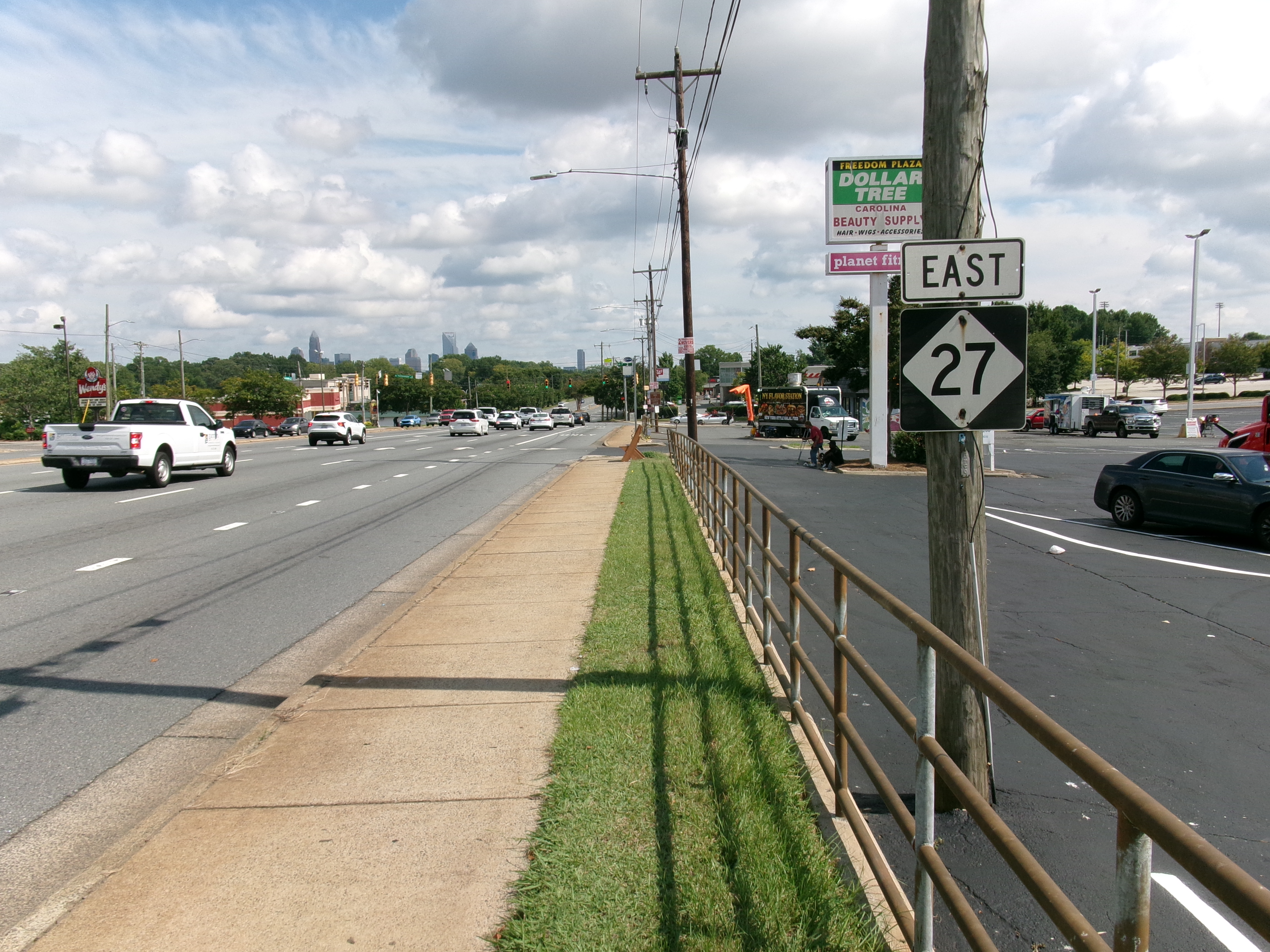
View east along NC 27 past the I-85 interchange in Charlotte

NC 27 is one of North Carolina's original state highways. Its original routing connected Charlotte to Lincolnton. It used several streets through Charlotte, but followed roughly the same route. The road was extended several times:

- 1923: east to Albemarle
- 1928: west to Toluca (current terminus)
- 1934: east to Carthage (using the concurrency with NC 24)
- 1948-50: east to Cameron
- 1958: east to Benson (current terminus)

NC 27 has had a tumultuous history through Charlotte. It has always served as a major east–west route through the city, but it has been rerouted numerous times on different city streets as traffic patterns changed. All of the following roads have carried NC 27 at one time or another:

- Rozelles Ferry Rd. (1923–1936)
- Mount Holly Road (1923–present)
- Trade St.(1923-?)
- Hawthorne Lane(1924–1936)
- Central Ave.(1924–1955)
- Albemarle Rd.(1924–present)
- Mint St.(1936–1946)
- Morehead St. (1936–present)
- Thrift Rd.(1936–1946)
- McDowell St. (1946–1955)
- Independence Blvd. (1955–present)
- Freedom Dr. (1958–Present)

== Major intersections ==
County	Location	mi	km	Destinations	Notes
Cleveland	Toluca	0.0	0.0	NC 10 (Casar Road)	Western terminus
Lincoln	Toluca	0.7	1.1	NC 18 (Fallston Road) – Shelby, Morganton	
Lincoln	Hulls Crossroads	4.1	6.6	NC 274 south – Cherryville	Northern terminus of NC 274
Lincoln		15.0	24.1	NC 182 west – Fallston, Lawndale	Eastern terminus of NC 182
Lincoln	Lincolnton	15.3	24.6	To NC 150 west (West Highway 150)	
Lincoln	Lincolnton	17.2	27.7	US 321 Bus. / NC 150 west (Generals Boulevard) – Cherryville, Gastonia, Shelby, Maiden	West end of NC 150 overlap
Lincoln	Lincolnton	17.8	28.6	US 321 – Dallas, Gastonia, Hickory	
Lincoln	Boger City	19.3	31.1	NC 150 east – Mooresville	East end of NC 150 overlap
Lincoln		21.0	33.8	NC 73 east – Lowesville	Western terminus of NC 73
Gaston	Stanley	30.5	49.1	NC 275 west (Chestnut Street) – Dallas	Eastern terminus of NC 275
Gaston	Mount Holly	36.9	59.4	NC 273 (Highland Street) – Belmont	
Mecklenburg	Charlotte	40.0	64.4	I-485 – Pineville, Huntersville	I-485 exit 14
Mecklenburg	Charlotte	45.0	72.4	I-85 – Spartanburg, Concord	I-85 exit 34
Mecklenburg	Charlotte	47.2	76.0	US 29 south (Morehead Street) / Freedom Drive	South end of US 29 overlap
Mecklenburg	Charlotte	47.5	76.4	I-77 / US 21 north – Statesville	I-77 exit 10A
Mecklenburg	Charlotte	48.1	77.4	US 29 / NC 49 north (Mint Street)	North end of US 29/NC 49 overlap
Mecklenburg	Charlotte	48.3	77.7	NC 49 south (South Tryon Street)	South end of NC 49 overlap
Mecklenburg	Charlotte	50.5	81.3	US 74 west (Independence Freeway) to I-277 / NC 16	West end of US 74 overlap US 74 exit 243; eastbound entrance and westbound exit
Mecklenburg	Charlotte	52.2	84.0	Briar Creek Road – Bojangles' Coliseum	US 74 exit 244; to Ovens Auditorium
Mecklenburg	Charlotte	53.0	85.3	Wendover Road/Eastway Drive	US 74 exit 245; signed as exits 245A (Wendover) and 245B (Eastway)
Mecklenburg	Charlotte	53.8	86.6	US 74 east (Independence Boulevard) – Monroe	East end of US 74 overlap US 74 exit 246; eastbound exit and westbound entrance
Mecklenburg	Charlotte	56.5	90.9	NC 24 west (WT Harris Boulevard)	West end of NC 24 overlap
Mecklenburg	Mint Hill	61.3	98.7	I-485 – Pineville, Huntersville	I-485 exit 41
Mecklenburg	Mint Hill	62.5	100.6	NC 51 south (Blair Road)	
Cabarrus	Midland	70.3	113.1	US 601 – Monroe, Concord	
Stanly	Locust	74.8	120.4	NC 200 (Central Avenue) – Stanfield, Monroe, Concord	
Stanly	Red Cross	79.0	127.1	NC 205 south – Oakboro	
Stanly	Albemarle	89.6	144.2	US 52 / NC 73 west (Aquadale Road) to NC 138 – Wadesboro, Salisbury	West end of NC 73 overlap
Stanly	Albemarle	89.9	144.7	US 52 Bus. (Second Street)	
Stanly	Albemarle	91.7	147.6	NC 740 north – Badin	Southern terminus of NC 740
Stanly	Pee Dee River	97.7	157.2	James B. Garrison Bridge	
Montgomery		97.9	157.6	NC 73 east – Mount Gilead	East end of NC 73 overlap
Montgomery		106.0	170.6	NC 109 south – Mount Gilead	South end of NC 109 overlap
Montgomery	Troy	109.4	176.1	NC 109 north (Bilhen Street) / NC 109 Bus. begin – Denton	North end of NC 109 and south end of NC 109 Bus. overlap
Montgomery	Troy	109.9	176.9	NC 134 / NC 109 Bus. north (Main Street)	North end of NC 109 Bus. overlap
Montgomery	Biscoe	116.5	187.5	US 220 Alt. (Main Street)	
Montgomery	Biscoe	117.3	188.8	I-73 / I-74 / US 220 – Rockingham, Asheboro	I-73 exit 49
Moore	Robbins	129.1	207.8	NC 705 (Pottery Highway) – Eagle Springs, Robbins	
Moore		134.2	216.0	NC 22 north – Ramseur, Greensboro	North end of NC 22 overlap
Moore	Carthage	139.3	224.2	NC 22 south (McNeill Street)	South end of NC 22 overlap
Moore	Carthage	140.3	225.8	US 15 / US 501 south – Pinehurst, Aberdeen	South end of US 15/US 501 overlap
Moore		142.3	229.0	US 15 / US 501 north – Sanford	North end of US 15/US 501 overlap
Moore	Cameron	149.0	239.8	US 1 Bus. – Vass	
Moore		150.7	242.5	US 1 – Southern Pines, Sanford	
Harnett	Johnsonville	159.1	256.0	NC 24 east – Fayetteville	East end of NC 24 overlap
Harnett	Pineview	161.4	259.7	NC 87 – Fayetteville, Sanford	
Harnett	Lillington	178.8	287.8	US 401 / NC 210 south (Main Street) – Fayetteville	South end of US 401/NC 210 overlap
Harnett	Lillington	179.2	288.4	US 421 north (Front Street) – Sanford	North end of US 421 overlap
Harnett	Lillington	180.8	291.0	US 401 north (Cornelius Harnett Boulevard) / NC 210 north (Main Street) – Fuquay-Varina	North end of US 401/NC 210 overlap
Harnett		185.8	299.0	US 421 south (Paul Green Memorial Highway) – Dunn	South end of US 421 overlap; Harnett County Airport at intersection
Harnett	Coats	190.0	305.8	NC 55 (McKinley Street) – Erwin, Angier	
Johnston	Benson	196.9	316.9	NC 50 north – Garner	North end of NC 50 overlap
Johnston	Benson	197.5	317.8	US 301 (Wall Street) / NC 50 south / NC 242 south (Main Street) – Dunn, Smithfield	Eastern terminus, South end of NC 50 overlap
1.000 mi = 1.609 km; 1.000 km = 0.621 mi: Concurrency terminus

== Special routes ==
=== Lincolnton truck route ===
North Carolina Highway 27 Truck
- Location: Lincolnton, North Carolina
- Length: 6.0 mi (9.7 km)

North Carolina Highway 27 Truck (NC 27 Truck) is a 6.0-mile (9.7 km) route that takes truck traffic south around downtown Lincolnton, via West Highway 150 and NC 150. Signage along the route only appears at key intersections.

=== Thrift–Charlotte alternate route ===
North Carolina Highway 27A
- Location: Thrift–Charlotte, NC
- Length: 8.6 mi (13.8 km)
- Existed: 1932–1936

North Carolina Highway 27A (NC 27A) was established as a renumbering of NC 271. Starting at the former community of Thrift (located in present-day Paw Creek neighborhood), it went south from Mount Holly Road, entering Charlotte along Tuckaseegee/Thrift Roads. It then overlapped with US 29/US 74/NC 20 on Morehead Street and US 74 on McDowell Street, before reconnecting with mainline NC 27 at 7th Street. In 1936, NC 27A was replaced by mainline NC 27.

=== Pee Dee–Wadeville alternate route ===
North Carolina Highway 27A
- Location: Pee Dee–Wadeville, NC
- Length: 12.1 mi (19.5 km)
- Existed: 1960–1967

North Carolina Highway 27A (NC 27A) was established when mainline NC 27 was rerouted on a more direct route between Lake Tillery and Troy, in Montgomery County. NC 27A follows NC 73 east, through Pee Dee, then continues straight along Pee Dee Road, connecting with NC 109, in Wadeville. Going back north, it reconnected with NC 27 west from Troy. In 1967, NC 27A was decommissioned, with Pee Dee Road only section to drop to a secondary road. From Lake Tillery to Wadeville, NC 27A formed the southern edge of the Uwharrie National Forest.

== See also ==
- North Carolina Bicycle Route 5 - concurrent with NC 27 near Buies Creek
- North Carolina Bicycle Route 6 - concurrent with NC 27 from Lincolnton to NC 73
