= Johnsonville, North Carolina =

Unincorporated community in North Carolina, US

Coordinates: 35°16′59″N 79°06′26″W

Johnsonville is an unincorporated community located in Johnsonville Township, Harnett County, North Carolina, United States. It is located at the intersection of NC 24 and NC 27. It is a part of the Dunn Micropolitan Area, which is also a part of the greater Research Triangle of Raleigh–Durham–Cary-Chapel Hill Combined Statistical Area as defined by the United States Census Bureau.

Residences in the community typically have a Cameron or Sanford, North Carolina address.
