= Johnsonville Township, Harnett County, North Carolina =

Township in Harnett County, North Carolina, U.S.

Coordinates: 35.2722146°N 79.1322744°W

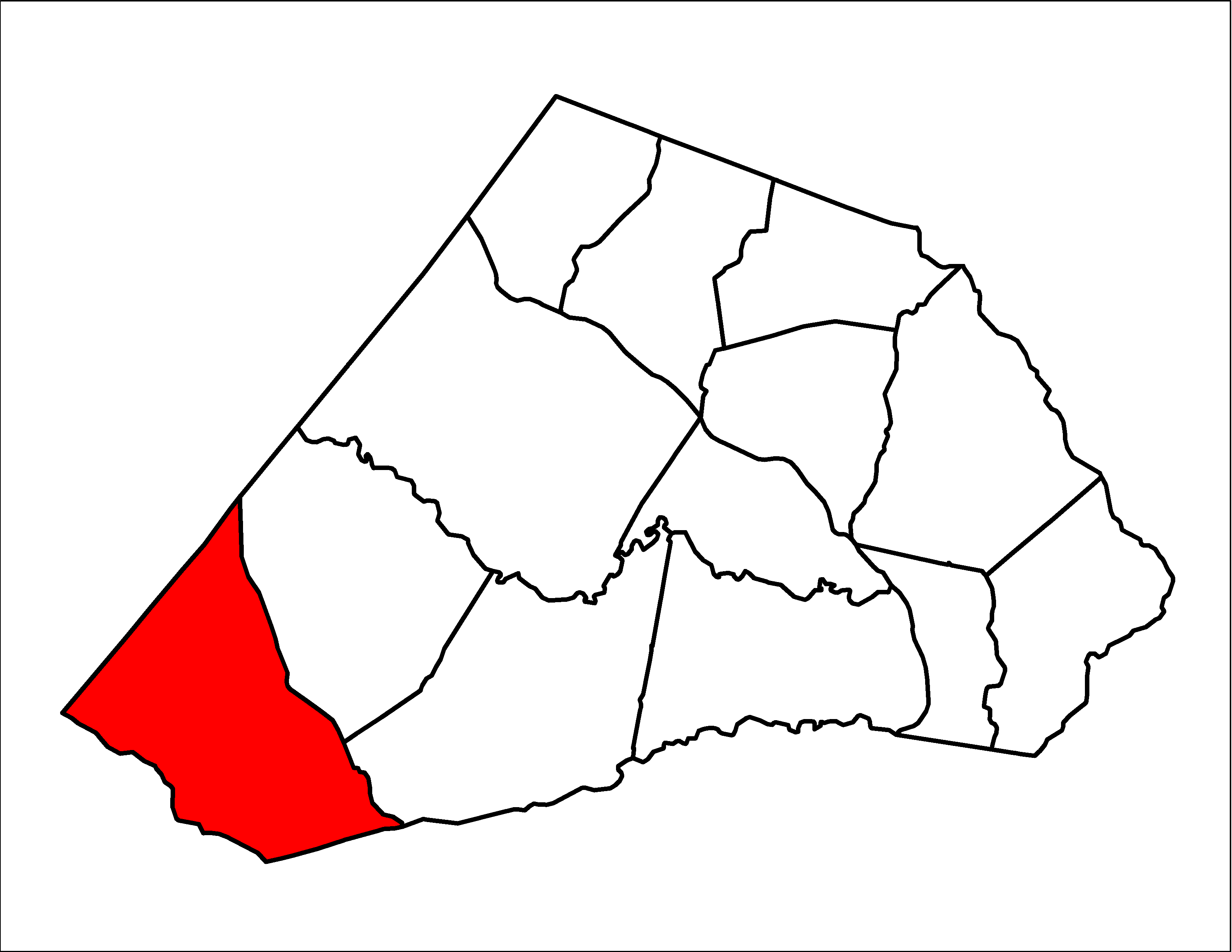
Location of Johnsonville Township in Harnett County, N.C.

Johnsonville Township is one of thirteen townships in Harnett County, North Carolina, United States. The township had a population of 6,927 according to the 2000 census. It is a part of the Dunn Micropolitan Area, which is also a part of the greater Raleigh–Durham–Cary Combined Statistical Area (CSA) as defined by the United States Census Bureau.

Geographically, Johnsonville Township occupies 65.17 square miles (168.8 km^{2}) in southwestern Harnett County. There are no incorporated municipalities located in Johnsonville Township, however, there are several unincorporated communities located here, including the communities of Johnsonville and Spout Springs.
