= James B. Garrison Bridge =

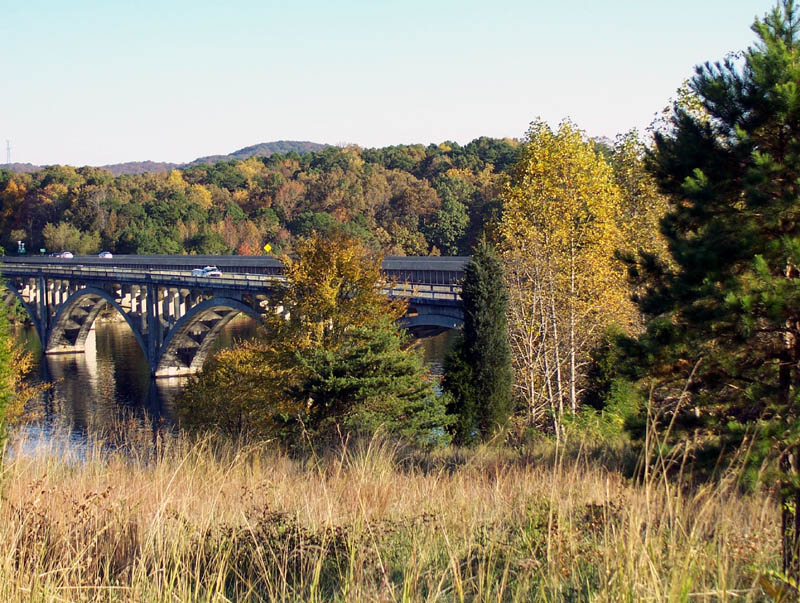
- Coordinates: 35.30826°N 80.07948°W
- Carries: 3 lanes of NC 24 / NC 27 / NC 73
- Crosses: Pee Dee River/Lake Tillery
- Locale: Stanly and Montgomery Counties
- Other name(s): Lake Tillery Bridge; Swift Island Ferry Bridge
- Owner: NCDOT
- Maintained by: NCDOT

Characteristics
- Design: Arch bridge (westbound); Steel stringer (eastbound)
- Material: Concrete (westbound); Steel (eastbound)
- Total length: 1,060.1 feet (323.1 m) (westbound); 1,140.1 feet (347.5 m) (eastbound)
- Width: 24.0 feet (7.3 m) (westbound); 43.0 feet (13.1 m) (eastbound)

History
- Opened: 1927 (westbound); 1979 (eastbound)

Statistics
- Daily traffic: 5,000 (as of 2011)

Location
- Interactive map of James B. Garrison Bridge

The James B. Garrison Bridge are two automobile bridges spanning the Pee Dee River/Lake Tillery, between Stanly and Montgomery Counties. The bridges carry NC 24/NC 27/NC 73.

== History ==
=== Swift Island Ferry Bridge I ===
The first bridge was opened on December 28, 1922, entirely in reinforced concrete; it was 1,068.7 feet (325.7 m) in length and 18.0 feet (5.5 m) in width. The bridge consisted of three 146.2-foot (44.6 m) arches and was built at a cost of approximately $186 thousand, it replaced the Swift's Island Ferry service, which the bridge was named after. In 1926, Carolina Power & Light began construction of the Tillery Hydroelectric Plant; the dam built in conjunction with the plant would establish a new lake (Lake Tillery), but would also submerge the bridge. As a result, Carolina Power & Light funded the construction of a new bridge that was overseen by the state. When the new bridge opened in 1927, the original bridge was closed and slated to be razed. In what became known as the "Battle of Swift Island Bridge," the US Army made several different attempts to destroy the bridge: first by overloading with weight, second by aerial bombing and third by artillery. The fourth attempt was finally successful after placing 2,000 pounds (910 kg) of explosives, placed at the bases of the structure, detonating the bridge. In 1928 the lake formed, submerging what little remained of the first bridge.

=== Swift Island Ferry Bridge II ===
The second and current westbound bridge opened in 1927, replacing the first Swift Island Ferry Bridge. Built entirely in reinforced concrete; the bridge consist of four 210.0-foot (64.0 m) arches, at 1,060.1 feet (323.1 m) long and 24.0 feet (7.3 m) wide. The bridge originally served NC 74 till 1934, when it was replaced by NC 27/NC 73. In 1963-1964, NC 24 was added to the bridge. In 1979, after the completion of a second parallel bridge, the Swift Island Ferry Bridge was renamed, with the new bridge, as the James B. Garrison Bridge, serving two-lanes of westbound NC 24/NC 27/NC 73.

=== James B. Garrison Bridge ===
On July 13, 1979, the older 1927 bridge and new 1979 bridge were dedicated to former North Carolina State Senator James B. Garrison. Between 1979-2003, both bridges provided four-lanes of traffic. In 2005, the older 1927 bridge was refurbished and was reduced to a single lane for westbound traffic. As part of the widening of N.C. 24-27, PCL Civil Constructors was awarded a $20.1 million contract in November 2018 to improve the bridges. The older bridge is being widened from 23 feet to 39 feet. All of the work was originally scheduled to be completed by December 2020. The project was not finished until 2022.
