= McGee's Crossroads, North Carolina =

Coordinates: 35°31′02″N 78°34′45″W

- Unincorporated community
- McGee's Crossroads Water Tower
- Interactive map of McGee's Crossroads, North Carolina
- Country: United States
- State: North Carolina
- County: Johnston
- Time zone: Eastern (EST)
  - Summer (DST): EDT

McGee's Crossroads is an unincorporated community in Johnston County, North Carolina, United States, situated at the intersection of North Carolina Highway 50, and North Carolina Highway 210. It lies at an elevation of 292 feet (89 m).

The community of McGee's Crossroads extends to the intersection of I-40 and Hwy. 210, west to the town of Angier, and the intersection of Hwy. 50 and Hwy. 42.

The area is also known as "50-210", a reference to the intersection of Hwy 50 and Hwy 210, as is the local fire department.

The area is also known as Black Creek, for a local water feature and church.

Schools in this area include McGee's Crossroads Elementary and McGee's Crossroads Middle.
