= Vander, North Carolina =

- Census-designated place
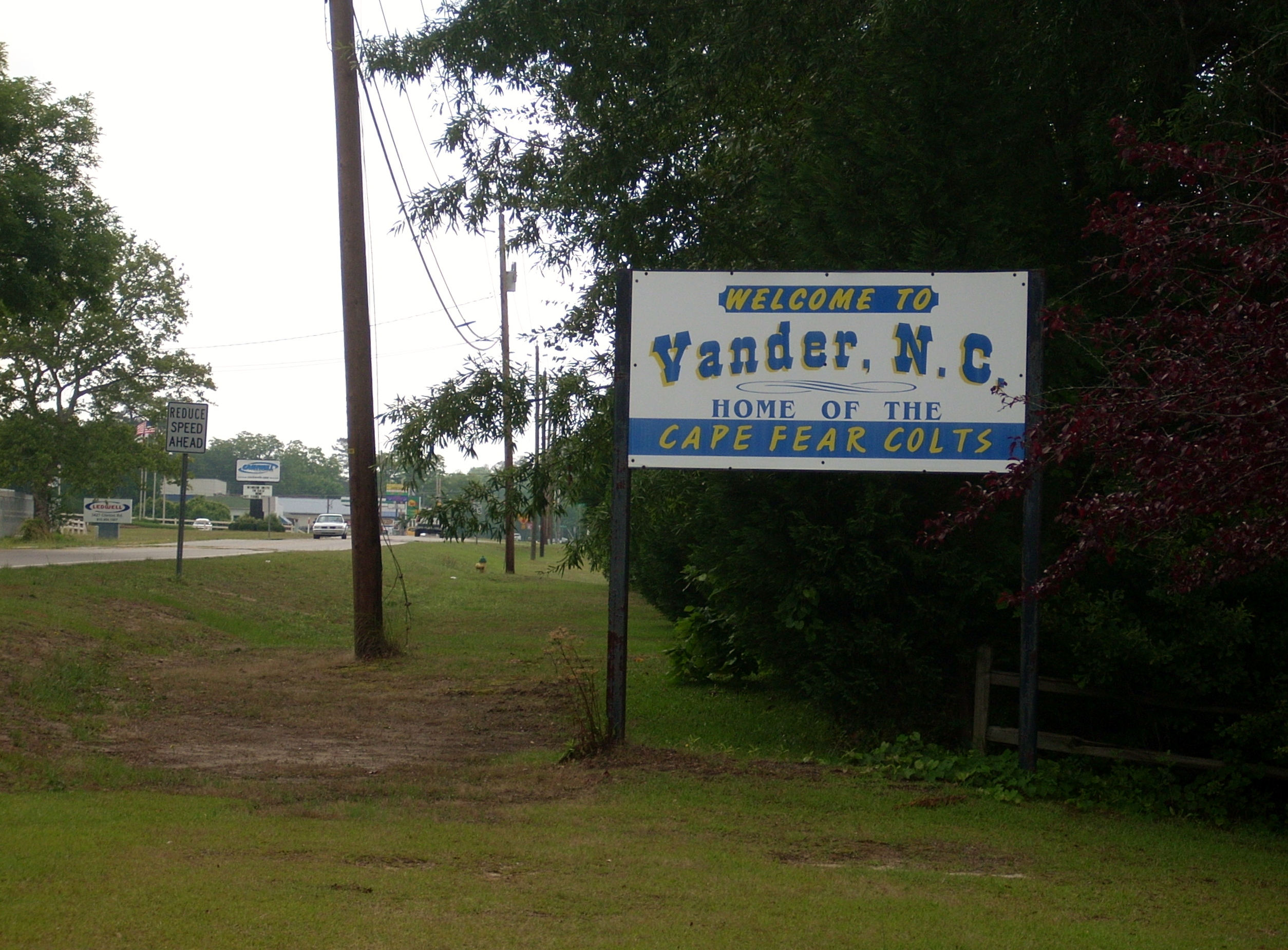
- The welcome sign for Vander

- Location in Cumberland County and the state of North Carolina.
- Coordinates: 35°02′05″N 78°47′19″W
- Country: United States
- State: North Carolina
- County: Cumberland

Area
  - Total: 3.72 sq mi (9.63 km^{2})
  - Land: 3.71 sq mi (9.61 km^{2})
  - Water: 0.0077 sq mi (0.02 km^{2})
- Elevation: 128 ft (39 m)

Population (2020)
  - Total: 1,388
  - Density: 374.2/sq mi (144.49/km^{2})
- Time zone: UTC-5 (Eastern (EST))
  - Summer (DST): UTC-4 (EDT)
- ZIP code: 28301
- Area codes: 910, 472
- FIPS code: 37-69740
- GNIS feature ID: 2402962

Vander is an unincorporated community and census-designated place (CDP) in Cumberland County, North Carolina, United States. The population was 1,388 at the 2020 census.

== Geography ==
Vander is located near the geographic center of Cumberland County. It is located just east of the city of Fayetteville (the Cumberland County seat) and just south of the town of Eastover. Interstate 95 forms the western edge of Vander; it intersects North Carolina Highway 24 at Exit 52 at the northwestern corner of the community, but there is no direct access to Vander, as Highway 24 is a limited-access highway at this point.

According to the United States Census Bureau, the CDP has a total area of 3.7 square miles (9.7 km^{2}), of which 0.01 square miles (0.02 km^{2}), or 0.21%, is water.

== Demographics ==
Historical population
Census	Pop.	Note	%±
2020	1,388		—
U.S. Decennial Census

As of the 2000 census, there were 1,204 people, 479 households, and 348 families residing in the CDP. The population density was 315.8 inhabitants per square mile (121.9/km^{2}). There were 527 housing units at an average density of 138.2 per square mile (53.4/km^{2}). The racial makeup of the CDP was 69.44% White, 24.92% African American, 2.08% Native American, 1.00% Asian, 0.08% Pacific Islander, 0.58% from other races, and 1.91% from two or more races. Hispanic or Latino of any race were 1.83% of the population.

There were 479 households, out of which 29.6% had children under the age of 18 living with them, 53.2% were married couples living together, 13.4% had a female householder with no husband present, and 27.3% were non-families. 24.2% of all households were made up of individuals, and 9.4% had someone living alone who was 65 years of age or older. The average household size was 2.51 and the average family size was 2.95.

In the CDP, the population was spread out, with 25.2% under the age of 18, 8.3% from 18 to 24, 30.7% from 25 to 44, 23.9% from 45 to 64, and 11.9% who were 65 years of age or older. The median age was 36 years. For every 100 females, there were 96.4 males. For every 100 females age 18 and over, there were 90.9 males.

The median income for a household in the CDP was $40,260, and the median income for a family was $44,167. Males had a median income of $32,750 versus $23,250 for females. The per capita income for the CDP was $19,059. About 8.7% of families and 9.1% of the population were below the poverty line, including 12.1% of those under age 18 and 13.2% of those age 65 or over.
