= Slover-Bradham House =

Historic house in North Carolina, United States

- U.S. National Register of Historic Places
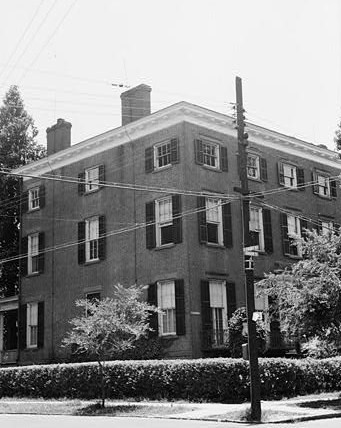
- Slover House, HABS Photo, 1937

- Location within North Carolina Location within the United States
- Location: 201 Johnson St., New Bern, North Carolina
- Coordinates: 35°6′39″N 77°2′13″W
- Area: 0.8 acres (0.32 ha)
- Built: 1848
- Architectural style: Renaissance
- NRHP reference No.: 73001327
- Added to NRHP: April 11, 1973

Slover-Bradham House is a historic house located at New Bern, Craven County, North Carolina. It was built about 1848, and is a three-story, Renaissance Revival-style brick dwelling with a low hipped roof. The brickwork is laid in Flemish bond. During the American Civil War, under the direction of General Ambrose Burnside it served as headquarters of the Eighteenth Army Corps and the Department of North Carolina. Pepsi Cola inventor Caleb Bradham owned the house from 1908 until 1934.

It was listed on the National Register of Historic Places in 1973.
