= WZKB =

- Wallace, North Carolina; United States
- Frequency: 94.3 MHz
- Branding: Mía 94.3

Programming
- Language: Spanish
- Format: Contemporary hit radio

Ownership
- Owner: Jose Enrique Coello & Vilma S Valladares Coello; (Carolina's Christian Broadcasting, Inc.)

History
- First air date: June 20, 1972
- Former call signs: WLSE-FM (1972–1980)

Technical information
- Licensing authority: FCC
- Facility ID: 31119
- Class: A
- ERP: 6,000 watts
- HAAT: 100 meters (330 ft)
- Transmitter coordinates: 34°45′30.6″N 77°59′50.9″W

Links
- Public license information: Public file; LMS
- Webcast: Listen live
- Website: mia943fm.com

WZKB (94.3 FM) is a radio station broadcasting a Spanish contemporary hit radio format. WZKB is licensed for Wallace, North Carolina.

== History ==
WLSE on 1400 kHz, and WLSE-FM on 94.3 MHz, were sister stations, both licensed for Wallace, North Carolina. WLSE (AM) started broadcasting on May 13, 1953, and broadcast on 1400 kHz. WLSE-FM started broadcasting on June 20, 1972 and changed its callsign to WZKB on July 14, 1980.

WZKB 94.3 FM and WLSE 1400AM back in the 80s were rock music and country music, respectively. The studio was divided in half. The FM studio consisted of two Harris turntables, a Harris 7 pot broadcast board and a boom broadcasting mic by Seinheiser. Both sides were manned by DJs from 6:00am to 12:00am seven days a week. After the station changed hands and went to Rick Goines, the station became automated with reel to reels and cart machines. The FM side, though, still was manned everyday. Local football games were announced on Friday nights by remote. Joseph Brennan was general manager.

The stations were later purchased later by Mack Jones: They were sold by Richard V. Goines (RVG Broadcasting Inc.) to JG&J Broadcasting Inc., headed by Mack Edmonson Jones, for $230,000; control was handed over on October 23, 1991. At the time, the AM station was operating with 1 kilowatt of power, and the FM was broadcasting 3 kilowatts.

The license for 1400 WLSE (AM) expired on December 1, 2003 without being renewed.

WZKB was sold to Christian Listening Network in 2003, and became a religious format until 2008, when it was sold to Carolina's Christian Broadcasting, Inc. dba Progress Media. WZKB then became a Spanish religious format for a time, then offered Spanish programming under LMA until late 2011, when WZKB became a simulcast of WTIK La Mega 1310 AM in Durham, North Carolina with a Regional Mexican format. In December 2014, WZKB ended its simulcast agreement with WTIK, and rebranded as Poder 94.3. In May 2015, WZKB rebranded as "Mía 94.3".
