= Caleb Bradham =

American pharmacist and founder of PepsiCo

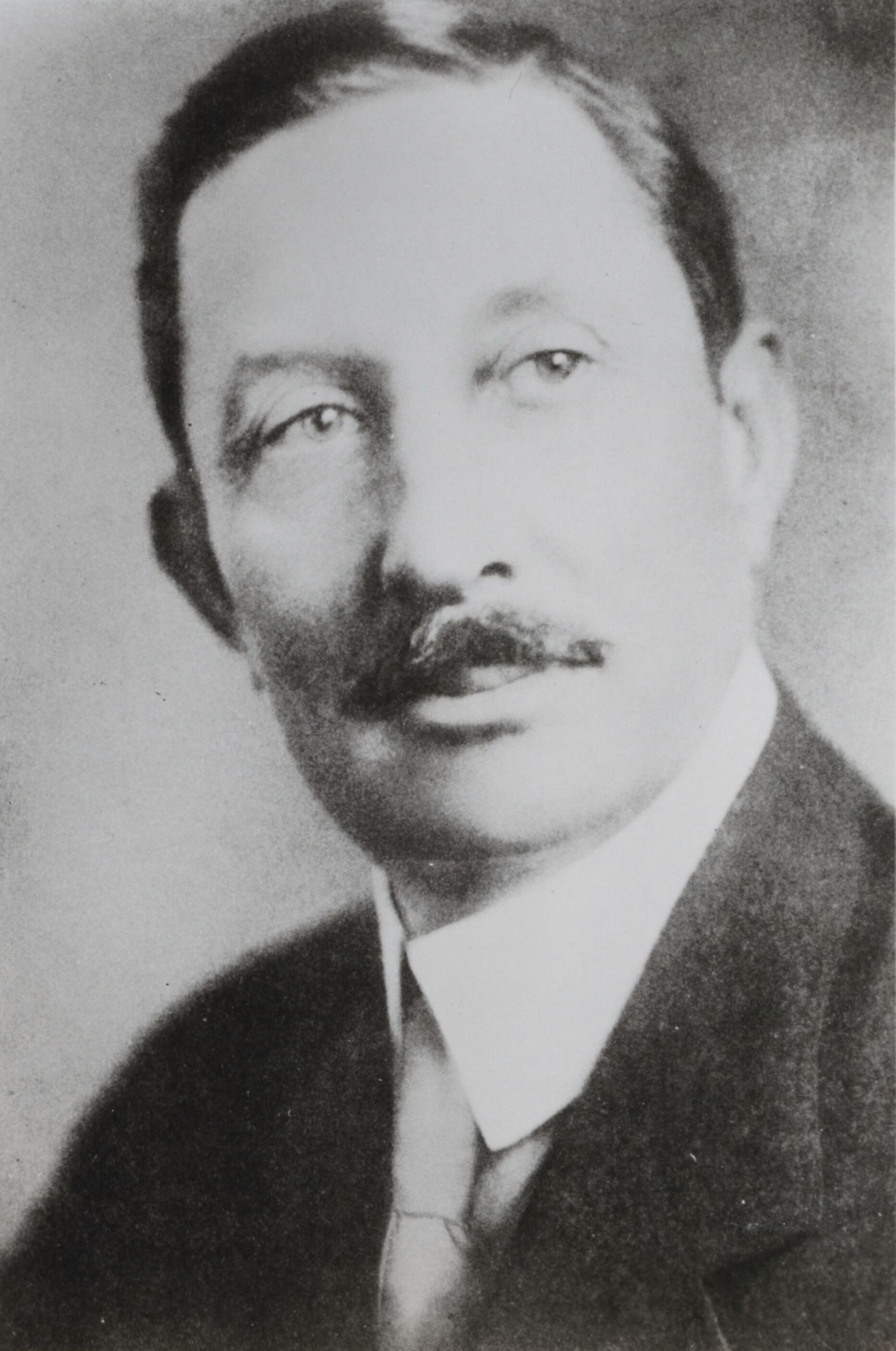
- Bradham, c. 1900
- Born: Caleb Eldsworth Bradham; May 27, 1867; Chinquapin, North Carolina, U.S.
- Died: February 19, 1934 (aged 66); New Bern, North Carolina, U.S.
- Education: University of North Carolina at Chapel Hill; University of Maryland, Baltimore
- Occupations: Pharmacist; inventor; company founder
- Known for: Inventor of Pepsi and Pepsi-Cola Company

Signature
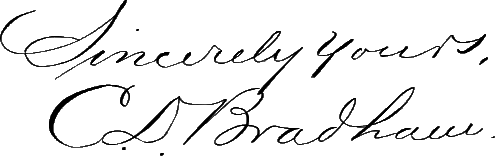

Caleb Davis Bradham (May 27, 1867 – February 19, 1934) was an American pharmacist who invented the soft drink Pepsi.

== Early life ==
Bradham was born Caleb Davis Bradham on May 27, 1867, in Chinquapin, North Carolina, to George Washington Bradham and Julia McCann Bradham. Bradham was of English and Scots-Irish descent.

He graduated from the University of North Carolina at Chapel Hill, where he was a member of the Philanthropic Society, and attended the University of Maryland School of Medicine.

== Bradham Drug Store Company ==
Circa 1890, he dropped out of the University of Maryland School of Medicine, owing to his father's business going bankrupt. After returning to North Carolina, he was a public school teacher for about a year and soon thereafter opened a drug store in New Bern named the "Bradham Drug Company" that, like many other drug stores of the time, also housed a soda fountain. Middle Street and Pollock Street in downtown New Bern is where Bradham, in 1893, invented the recipe—a blend of kola nut extract, vanilla, and "rare oils"—for what was initially known as "Brad's Drink," but on August 28, 1898, was renamed Pepsi-Cola. Bradham named his drink after a combination of the terms "dyspepsia" and "cola", intending to market his drink as having digestive benefits. His assistant James Henry King was the first to taste the new drink.

=== Pepsi-Cola ===
On December 24, 1902, the Pepsi-Cola Company was incorporated in North Carolina, with Bradham as the president, and on June 16, 1903, the first Pepsi-Cola trademark was registered. Also in 1903, he moved his Pepsi-Cola production out of his drug store and into a rented building nearby. In 1905, Bradham began selling Pepsi-Cola in six-ounce bottles (up until this time he sold Pepsi-Cola as a syrup only) and awarded two franchises to North Carolina bottlers.

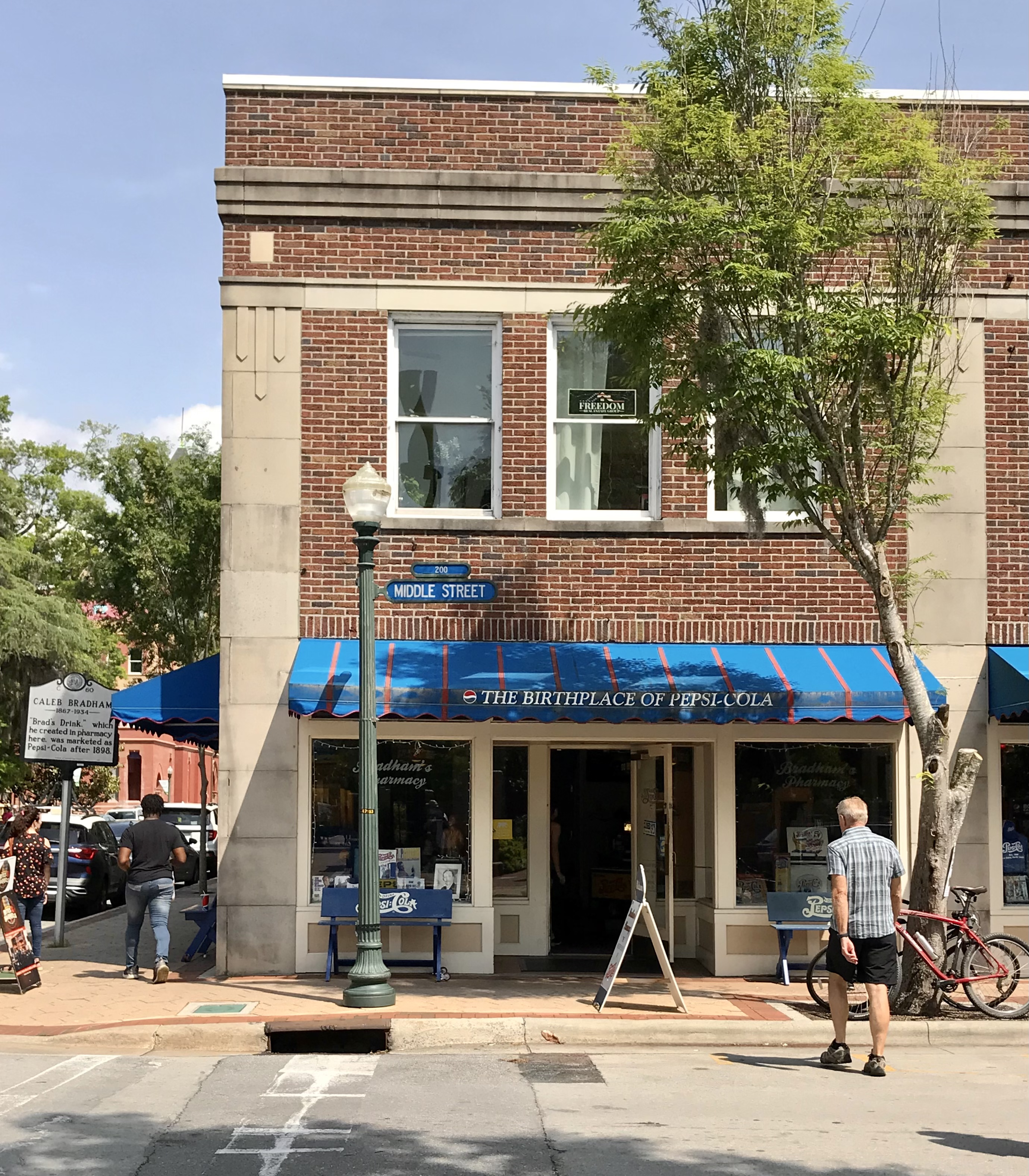
Bradham's Pharmacy in New Bern, North Carolina

== Naval reserve ==
In addition to running his drug store, he served as the president of the People's Bank of New Bern and was a chairman of the Craven County Board of Commissioners. At one point he was even suggested as a candidate for governor of North Carolina. He also served as an officer in the naval reserve for 25 years; he was named a lieutenant in the North Carolina Naval Militia, was promoted to commander in 1904, and to captain in 1913. He retired as a rear admiral. Additionally, in 1914, he was appointed by Secretary of the Navy Josephus Daniels to the General Naval Militia Board.

== Success and buy out ==
At the peak of success, Bradham had authorized Pepsi-Cola franchises in over 24 states; however, on May 31, 1923, Bradham and his Pepsi-Cola Company declared bankruptcy. The major factor for Bradham's business failure was the price of sugar immediately following World War I, when prices went up to 28 cents per pound (it was three cents per pound pre-war), and Bradham had purchased a large amount of sugar at that price but the price of sugar nosedived soon after he purchased it. The assets of his company were sold to the Craven Holding Company for $30,000. After declaring bankruptcy, Bradham returned to operating his drug store.

== Personal life ==
On January 4, 1901, Bradham married Charity Credle in New Bern, North Carolina. He owned the Slover-Bradham House from 1908 to 1934. The house was listed on the National Register of Historic Places in 1973.

He died on February 19, 1934, at New Bern, Craven County, North Carolina.
