= Spout Springs, North Carolina =

- Census-designated place
- Location within North Carolina Location within the United States
- Coordinates: 35°16′21″N 79°01′59″W
- Country: United States
- State: North Carolina
- County: Harnett

Area
  - Total: 9.06 sq mi (23.46 km^{2})
  - Land: 8.58 sq mi (22.22 km^{2})
  - Water: 0.48 sq mi (1.24 km^{2})
- Elevation: 230 ft (70 m)

Population (2020)
  - Total: 11,040
  - Density: 1,286.9/sq mi (496.89/km^{2})
- Time zone: UTC-5 (Eastern (EST))
  - Summer (DST): UTC-4 (EDT)
- GNIS feature ID: 2805284

Spout Springs is a Census-designated place in Johnsonville Township of Harnett County, North Carolina, United States. It was first listed as a CDP in the 2020 census with a population of 11,040.

It is a part of the Dunn Micropolitan Area, which is also a part of the greater Raleigh–Durham–Cary Combined Statistical Area (CSA) as defined by the United States Census Bureau.

Spout Springs formerly produced lumber and naval stores.

The area population has increased greatly in the 21st century due to the expansion of nearby Ft. Bragg.

== Demographics ==
Historical population
Census	Pop.	Note	%±
2020	11,040		—
U.S. Decennial Census; 2020

=== 2020 census ===
As of the 2020 census, the CDP had a population of 11,040. The median age was 30.6 years. 32.9% of residents were under the age of 18 and 6.2% of residents were 65 years of age or older. For every 100 females there were 97.7 males, and for every 100 females age 18 and over there were 94.0 males age 18 and over.

98.4% of residents lived in urban areas, while 1.6% lived in rural areas.

There were 3,533 households in the CDP, of which 50.9% had children under the age of 18 living in them. Of all households, 67.9% were married-couple households, 11.7% were households with a male householder and no spouse or partner present, and 15.6% were households with a female householder and no spouse or partner present. About 13.5% of all households were made up of individuals and 3.8% had someone living alone who was 65 years of age or older.

There were 3,819 housing units, of which 7.5% were vacant. The homeowner vacancy rate was 2.7% and the rental vacancy rate was 7.0%.

Stout Springs CDP, North Carolina – Demographic Profile (NH = Non-Hispanic)
Race / Ethnicity	Pop 2020	% 2020
White alone (NH)	5,735	51.95%
Black or African American alone (NH)	2,374	21.50%
Native American or Alaska Native alone (NH)	69	0.63%
Asian alone (NH)	305	2.76%
Pacific Islander alone (NH)	37	0.34%
Some Other Race alone (NH)	68	0.62%
Mixed Race/Multi-Racial (NH)	780	7.07%
Hispanic or Latino (any race)	1,672	15.14%
Total	11,040	100.00%

Note: the US Census treats Hispanic/Latino as an ethnic category. This table excludes Latinos from the racial categories and assigns them to a separate category. Hispanics/Latinos can be of any race.
