= Acme, North Carolina =

Acme
- Unincorporated community
- Location in North Carolina Acme (the United States)
- Coordinates: 34°19′33″N 78°12′17″W
- Country: United States
- State: North Carolina
- County: Columbus
- Elevation: 46 ft (14 m)
- Time zone: UTC-5 (Eastern (EST))
  - Summer (DST): UTC-4 (EDT)
- Area codes: 910, 472

Acme is an unincorporated community in Columbus County, in the U.S. state of North Carolina.

== History ==
A post office called Acme was established in 1911, and remained in operation until it was discontinued in 1963. The community took its name from the local Acme Manufacturing Company.
