= Maple Hill, North Carolina =

Unincorporated community in North Carolina, U.S.

Maple Hill
- Unincorporated community
- Location within North Carolina
- Coordinates: 34.66°N 77.69°W
- Country: United States
- State: North Carolina
- Counties: Onslow, Pender
- Named for: Maple grove on a nearby hill
- Elevation: 33 ft (10 m)

Population (2020)
  - Total: 3,175
- Time zone: UTC-5 (EST)
  - Summer (DST): UTC-4 (EDT)
- Postal code: 28452
- Area codes: 910, 472

Maple Hill is an unincorporated community located in Onslow and Pender counties, North Carolina, United States. The population was 3,175 at the 2020 census.

== Geography ==
Maple Hill is located in northeastern Pender County and southwestern Onslow County. The elevation of the community is 33 feet (10 m).

The ZIP Code for Maple Hill is 28452.
