= Chinquapin, North Carolina =

- Census-designated place
- Location within the state of North Carolina Chinquapin (the United States)
- Coordinates: 34°49′54″N 77°49′15″W
- Country: United States
- State: North Carolina
- County: Duplin
- Established: 1884

Area
  - Total: 1.39 sq mi (3.60 km^{2})
  - Land: 1.39 sq mi (3.60 km^{2})
  - Water: 0 sq mi (0.00 km^{2})
- Elevation: 36 ft (11 m)

Population (2020)
  - Total: 86
  - Density: 62/sq mi (23.9/km^{2})
- Time zone: UTC-5 (Eastern (EST))
  - Summer (DST): UTC-4 (EDT)
- ZIP code: 28521
- Area codes: 910, 472
- FIPS code: 37-12520
- GNIS feature ID: 2812791

Chinquapin is an unincorporated community and census-designated place (CDP) located adjacent to the Northeast Cape Fear River in Duplin County, North Carolina, United States. It was first listed as a CDP in the 2020 census with a population of 86.

== History ==
The roots of Chinquapin, North Carolina lie largely with the Thigpen family, who migrated to the area from Perquimans Precinct in the 1730s. James Thigpen, the first of the Duplin County Thigpens, obtained a patent for land bordering the Northeast Cape Fear River, establishing a plantation he called "Chinquapen Orchard." James and his kin named many of the creeks around their new home after those in Perquimans – Cypress Creek, Muddy Creek, even Chinquapin itself. An Algonquian word, chinquapin, or "chinkapin," is Castanea pumila, a diminutive cousin of the American chestnut that is abundant along creeks and rivers of the Southeastern United States. According to Bible records, James Thigpen died at Chinquapen Orchard in 1737. His son, Dr. James Thigpen IV, purchased the land from his mother (she had remarried) for his son Job, holding it in trust until he reached maturity. When Job and his wife Annie began running the plantation in 1754, they dropped the latter part of the name, simply calling their home Chinquapin.

During this period significant numbers of Scotch-Irish immigrants began arriving to the Cape Fear region, settling on land purchased from a London merchant named Henry McCulloch, who had obtained 71,160 acres along the river from the British Crown. There was extensive mingling between these newer inhabitants and those inhabitants who had been in the area for some time, such as the Thigpens, as marriage records substantiate.

In 1780 Chinquapin was burned by Tories, likely in retaliation for Job's service in the N.C. militia. As Job did not survive the war, it was left to his eldest son, Joab, to rebuild the plantation. Chinquapin has always been a predominantly agrarian community focused around the cultivation of corn and (to a lesser extent now) tobacco. Raising livestock and harvesting timber/naval stores has also been an essential component of the local economy for centuries. Before the railroad, the only feasible method for these commodities to reach the market (namely that of Wilmington) was via river. Ideally located near the N.E. Cape Fear, Chinquapin was oftentimes the port of departure for produce in eastern Duplin County, especially at times of low water levels when sites further upriver were not accessible. Throughout the early 19th century, the plantation at Chinquapin grew from a homestead with a handful of slaves to a community of several dozen people.

In 1865, towards the end of the Civil War, Union troops captured a small steamer named the A. P. Hurt at Fayetteville. They appointed a former slave named Dan Buxton its pilot and sent it to operate at Chinquapin. After the war, Buxton tracked down the businessmen who had originally owned the vessel and informed them that he considered the A.P. Hurt to still be their property. Buxton promised to return her if they kept him as pilot for life. When she sank in 1923, he was still on the job after sixty years. Together with P.D. Robbins, who operated a steamer in the nearby community of Hallsville (just above Chinquapin), the duo represent a rich, often overlooked, history of African American river boating in Duplin County.

In 1884, a post office was built in Chinquapin; the first postmaster was local farmer and storekeeper William Herring Sloan. Beginning in 1890, a project was funded by the state for the clearing of the river for small steamers to Hallsville, 88 miles above the mouth of the Northeast Cape Fear River, and for pole boats to Kornegay's Bridge, 103 miles above the mouth. The project lasted until roughly 1913, by which time $33,738.86 had been spent on improvements to and maintenance of the channel. River commerce remained steady until lumber companies began laying rail throughout the county.

A railroad depot was constructed in Chinquapin around 1916. The Atlantic & Carolina Railroad ran from the Atlantic Coast Line Railroad (just north of the station at Warsaw) through Kenansville to Chinquapin. North of Chinquapin, across Muddy Creek, the A & C, the Kinston Carolina RR (Rowland Lumber Company), and Ropper Lumber Company laid secondary tracks near Chinquapin to facilitate the harvesting of longleaf pine forests around that section of the county. Local photographs from this period are notable in that there are no significant groupings of trees visible in them. Despite the initial economic boom resulting from the presence of the railroad, which was dismantled during the Great Depression, and the widespread clear-cut logging that it allowed for, Chinquapin has grown very little since the early 20th century. The majority of the area's population growth has actually taken place in the countryside surrounding the community and in the nearby towns of Wallace and Beulaville. Several small businesses still call Chinquapin home, however, and the community is still served by a post office and an elementary school.

== Education ==
In the early 1900s, Booker T. Washington and a philanthropist named Julius Rosenwald helped set up schools for children in rural black communities. One such "Rosenwald School" operated in Chinquapin as late as the 1930s. Chinquapin High School was built in 1925 and first accredited in 1926 – its first principal was Arthur Ranes. The building was two stories and of wood framed/brick veneer construction. A two-story attached classroom wing and detached cafeteria, both of masonry construction, were added in the 1950s. In 2010, the county demolished the structure through a controlled burn.

== Demographics ==
Historical population
Census	Pop.	Note	%±
2020	86		—
U.S. Decennial Census; 2020

=== 2020 census ===
Chinquapin CDP, North Carolina – Racial and ethnic composition Note: the US Census treats Hispanic/Latino as an ethnic category. This table excludes Latinos from the racial categories and assigns them to a separate category. Hispanics/Latinos may be of any race.
Race / Ethnicity (NH = Non-Hispanic)	Pop 2020	% 2020
White alone (NH)	53	61.63%
Black or African American alone (NH)	8	9.30%
Native American or Alaska Native alone (NH)	0	0.00%
Asian alone (NH)	1	1.16%
Pacific Islander alone (NH)	0	0.00%
Some Other Race alone (NH)	2	2.33%
Mixed Race or Multi-Racial (NH)	5	5.81%
Hispanic or Latino (any race)	17	19.77%
Total	86	100.00%

== Churches ==
- Chinquapin Presbyterian Church
- St. Lewis Missionary Baptist Church
- Shiloh Baptist Church
- Sharon Baptist Church
- Bethlehem Church
- First Missionary Baptist Church
- The Mount Church
- The Church of Jesus Christ of Latter-day Saints

== Notable people ==
- Caleb Bradham (1867–1934), inventor of Pepsi-Cola
- Randall Kenan (1963–2020), American author of fiction and non-fiction
- Jamie Pickett (born 1988), UFC fighter
