= White Lake, North Carolina =

- Town
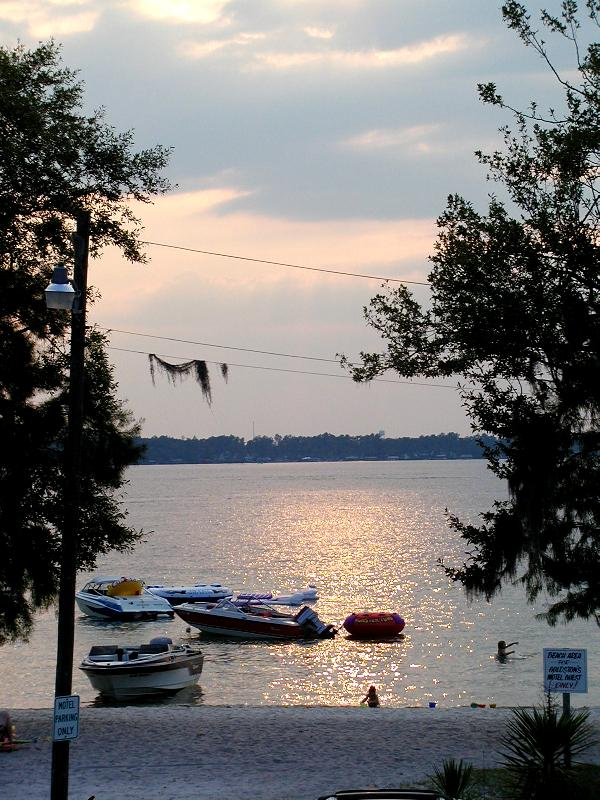
- White Lake at dusk

- Seal

- Location in Bladen County and the state of North Carolina.
- Coordinates: 34°38′30″N 78°29′49″W
- Country: United States
- State: North Carolina
- County: Bladen

Government
  - Mayor: H. Goldston Womble, Jr.

Area
  - Total: 2.66 sq mi (6.89 km^{2})
  - Land: 1.02 sq mi (2.65 km^{2})
  - Water: 1.63 sq mi (4.23 km^{2})
- Elevation: 66 ft (20 m)

Population (2020)
  - Total: 843
  - Density: 822.9/sq mi (317.74/km^{2})
- Time zone: UTC-5 (Eastern (EST))
  - Summer (DST): UTC-4 (EDT)
- ZIP code: 28337
- Area codes: 910, 472
- FIPS code: 37-73300
- GNIS feature ID: 2406878
- Website: www.whitelakenc.org

White Lake is a shallow, natural clear water lake and a popular resort town near Elizabethtown in Bladen County, North Carolina, United States. At the 2020 census, the population was 843.

Each summer around 200,000 visitors travel to White Lake, as the lake's shore is deemed one of the safest beaches in the country since it has no currents or tides. It has white sand and pristine clear water originated from a combination of rainfall and subterranean springs.

== Geography ==
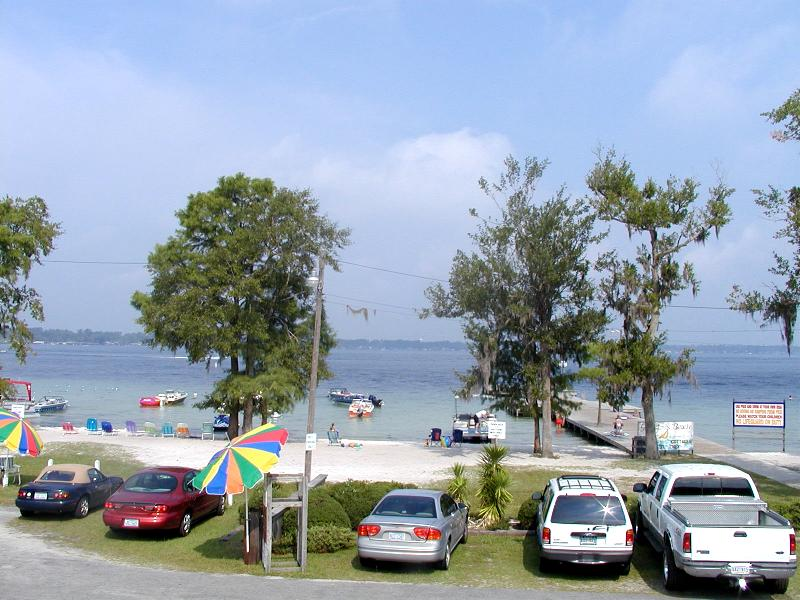
White Lake

According to the United States Census Bureau, the town has a total area of 2.6 square miles (6.8 km^{2}), of which 0.97 square miles (2.5 km^{2}) is land and 1.6 square miles (4.2 km^{2}), or 62.51%, is water, consisting of the freshwater lake for which the town is named.

== Demographics ==
Historical population
Census	Pop.	Note	%±
1960	130		—
1970	232		78.5%
1980	968		317.2%
1990	390		−59.7%
2000	529		35.6%
2010	802		51.6%
2020	843		5.1%
U.S. Decennial Census

At the 2000 census there were 529 people, 238 households, and 149 families in the town. The population density was 593.1 inhabitants per square mile (229.0/km^{2}). There were 1,060 housing units at an average density of 1,188.5 per square mile (458.9/km^{2}). The racial makeup of the town was 92.25% White, 3.59% African American, 0.57% Asian, 3.01% from other races, and 0.57% from two or more races. Hispanic or Latino of any race were 3.40%.

Of the 238 households 23.9% had children under the age of 18 living with them, 50.4% were married couples living together, 9.7% had a female householder with no husband present, and 37.0% were non-families. 32.8% of households were one person and 10.9% were one person aged 65 or older. The average household size was 2.22 and the average family size was 2.83.

The age distribution was 20.8% under the age of 18, 7.0% from 18 to 24, 27.6% from 25 to 44, 30.8% from 45 to 64, and 13.8% 65 or older. The median age was 42 years. For every 100 females, there were 94.5 males. For every 100 females age 18 and over, there were 91.3 males.

The median household income was $35,375 and the median family income was $45,625. Males had a median income of $36,875 versus $25,000 for females. The per capita income for the town was $22,446. About 9.9% of families and 14.2% of the population were below the poverty line, including 30.4% of those under age 18 and 11.0% of those age 65 or over.
