= Wallace, North Carolina =

- Town
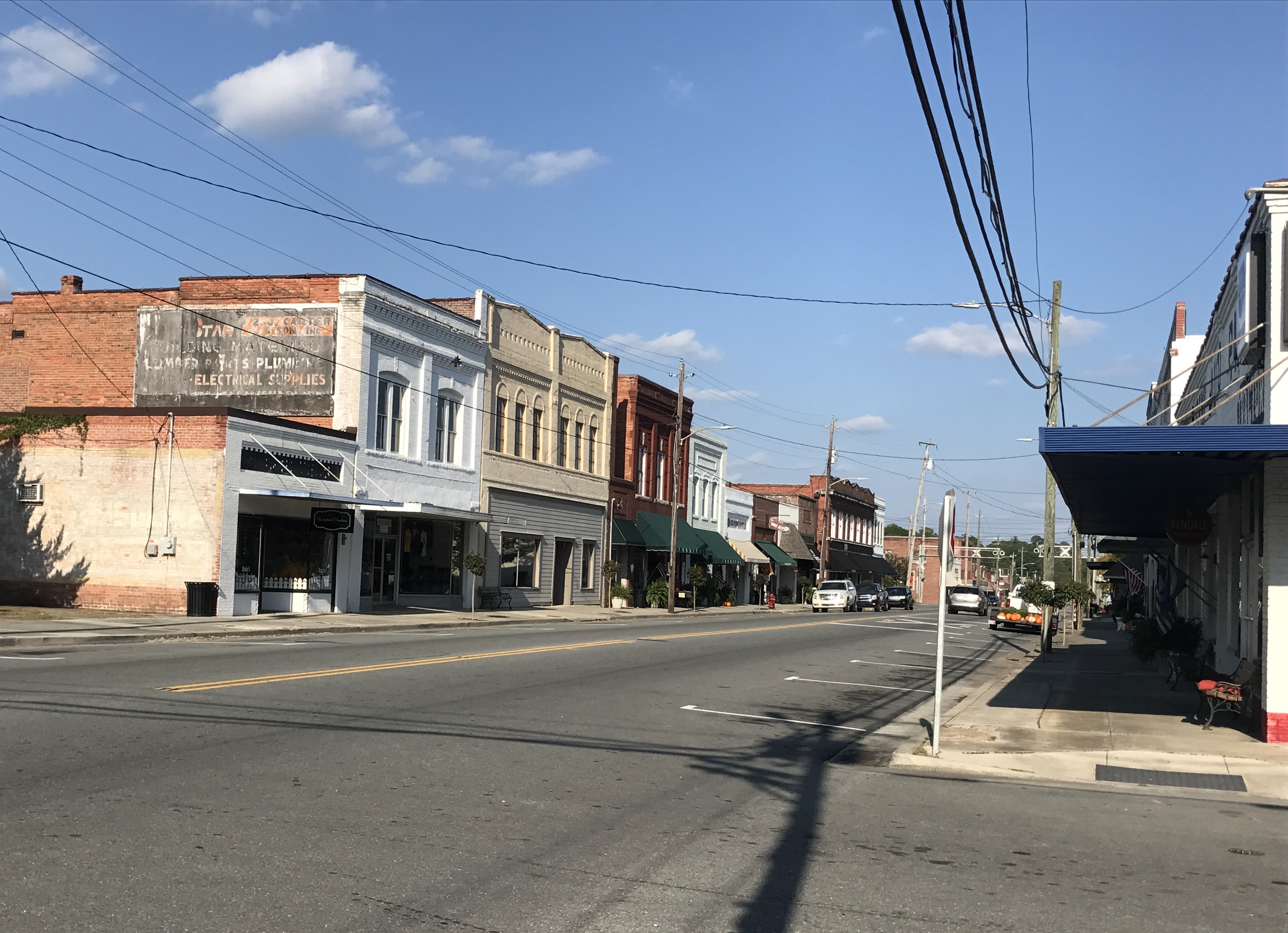

- Seal
- Motto: "Pleasant...Progressive...Prosperous"
- Location within the state of North Carolina
- Coordinates: 34°44′16″N 77°59′26″W
- Country: United States
- State: North Carolina
- Counties: Duplin, Pender

Area
  - Total: 3.19 sq mi (8.27 km^{2})
  - Land: 3.19 sq mi (8.27 km^{2})
  - Water: 0 sq mi (0.00 km^{2})
- Elevation: 52 ft (16 m)

Population (2020)
  - Total: 3,413
  - Density: 1,068.7/sq mi (412.64/km^{2})
- Time zone: UTC−5 (Eastern (EST))
  - Summer (DST): UTC−4 (EDT)
- ZIP code: 28466
- Area codes: 910, 472
- FIPS code: 37-70720
- GNIS feature ID: 2406822
- Website: www.wallacenc.gov

Wallace is a town in Duplin and Pender counties in the U.S. state of North Carolina. The population was 3,883 at the 2020 census. The Pender County portion of Wallace is part of the Wilmington Metropolitan Statistical Area. The town of Wallace was first known as Duplin Crossroads and was incorporated into existence in 1873. Later in 1899, the town fathers decided to adopt the new name, Wallace, to honor Stephen D. Wallace, an official of the Atlantic Coast Line Railroad. Wallace is Duplin County's largest population and retail trade center serving over 50,000 people in a surrounding three county area.

SouthPark, an industrial park, is open near I-40 in Wallace. Low tax rates are an incentive to industry and business considering the Wallace area.

The Wallace Airport, Henderson Field, serves to make Wallace more accessible. The airport offers a 4,000-foot paved and lighted runway with a navigational beacon.

== History ==
Wallace was settled by the Boney family in the early 19th century. The Wilmington and Weldon Railroad spurred the development and it helped Wallace’s development and growth. Gabriel Boney, a local entrepreneur, seized the opportunities provided by the railroad and by 1870, had established a cotton gin, turpentine distillery, and general store, laying the foundation for the town and introduce strawberries to the region and which became a vital industry for Wallace, earning it the title of the "World's Largest Strawberry Exchange . In 1873 and the town was incorporated as Duplin Roads and it was named after Stephen D. Wallace, President of the Atlantic Coast Line Railroad

== Geography ==
Wallace is located in southern Duplin County and the town limits extend south into Pender County.

U.S. Route 117 passes through the center of town, leading north 19 miles (31 km) to Warsaw and south 15 miles (24 km) to Burgaw. North Carolina Highway 41 crosses US 117 in the center of Wallace, and leads northeast 14 miles (23 km) to Chinquapin and west 14 miles (23 km) to Harrells. Interstate 40 passes east of Wallace, with access from Exit 390 (US 117 4 miles (6 km) south of town) and Exit 385 (NC 41 3 miles (5 km) east of town). I-40 leads south 44 miles (71 km) to Wilmington and north 89 miles (143 km) to Raleigh.

According to the United States Census Bureau, the town has a total area of 3.1 square miles (7.9 km^{2}), all land.

== Demographics ==
Historical population
Census	Pop.	Note	%±
1890	119		—
1900	218		83.2%
1910	444		103.7%
1920	648		45.9%
1930	734		13.3%
1940	1,050		43.1%
1950	1,622		54.5%
1960	2,285		40.9%
1970	2,905		27.1%
1980	2,903		−0.1%
1990	2,939		1.2%
2000	3,344		13.8%
2010	3,880		16.0%
2020	3,413		−12.0%
U.S. Decennial Census

=== 2020 census ===
As of the 2020 census, Wallace had a population of 3,413. The median age was 40.5 years. 25.1% of residents were under the age of 18 and 22.1% of residents were 65 years of age or older. For every 100 females there were 87.2 males, and for every 100 females age 18 and over there were 81.5 males age 18 and over.

0.0% of residents lived in urban areas, while 100.0% lived in rural areas.

Wallace racial composition
Race	Number	Percentage
White (non-Hispanic)	1,426	41.78%
Black or African American (non-Hispanic)	835	24.47%
Native American	20	0.59%
Asian	14	0.41%
Other/Mixed	76	2.23%
Hispanic or Latino	1,042	30.53%

There were 1,328 households in Wallace, including 833 family households, and 33.7% had children under the age of 18 living in them. Of all households, 38.1% were married-couple households, 18.9% were households with a male householder and no spouse or partner present, and 37.9% were households with a female householder and no spouse or partner present. About 32.7% of all households were made up of individuals and 18.7% had someone living alone who was 65 years of age or older.

There were 1,597 housing units, of which 16.8% were vacant. The homeowner vacancy rate was 0.5% and the rental vacancy rate was 6.4%.

=== 2000 census ===
As of the census of 2000, there were 3,344 people, 1,329 households, and 862 families residing in the town. The population density was 1,299.5 inhabitants per square mile (501.7/km^{2}). There were 1,440 housing units at an average density of 559.6 units per square mile (216.1 units/km^{2}). The racial makeup of the town was 55.65% White, 28.26% African American, 0.06% Native American, 0.24% Asian, 14.06% from other races, and 1.73% from two or more races. Hispanic or Latino of any race were 18.18% of the population.

There were 1,329 households, out of which 28.3% had children under the age of 18 living with them, 44.0% were married couples living together, 15.3% had a female householder with no husband present, and 35.1% were non-families. 31.2% of all households were made up of individuals, and 17.5% had someone living alone who was 65 years of age or older. The average household size was 2.42 and the average family size was 2.96.

In the town, the age distribution of the population shows 23.6% under the age of 18, 8.6% from 18 to 24, 27.0% from 25 to 44, 21.7% from 45 to 64, and 19.1% who were 65 years of age or older. The median age was 38 years. For every 100 females, there were 85.6 males. For every 100 females age 18 and over, there were 81.6 males.

The median income for a household in the town was $25,422, and the median income for a family was $33,413. Males had a median income of $29,226 versus $16,250 for females. The per capita income for the town was $14,380. About 18.8% of families and 23.3% of the population were below the poverty line, including 26.6% of those under age 18 and 26.1% of those age 65 or over.

=== Population growth ===
Mayor Wells called upon Planning Director Rod Fritz to brief the council on rezoning 150 acres south of Wallace in the community of Willard of Pender County. The Planning Board unanimously approved this rezoning request. That area of Willard is now a part of Wallace and the site where hundreds of new homes will be constructed near the exit 390 overpass of Interstate 40.

Council Member Brinkley made a motion to establish a public hearing on March 14, 2024, for the rezoning of property on Hwy 11, that was seconded by Council Member Rivas-Diaz and approved unanimously. That hearing discussed the potential development of hundreds of new homes in the Tin City community of Wallace.

=== Communities ===
==== Tin City ====
Tin City has a median real estate price is $342,217, more expensive than 60.8% of the neighborhoods in North Carolina and 49.8% of the neighborhoods in the U.S. The average rental price in Tin City is currently $1,073, based on NeighborhoodScout's exclusive analysis. Rents are lower in price than 95.3% of North Carolina neighborhoods. Tin City is a rural neighborhood (based on population density) located in Wallace, North Carolina. Tin City real estate is primarily made up of medium-sized (three or four bedroom) to small (studio to two bedroom) single-family homes and small apartment buildings. Most of the residential real estate is occupied by a mixture of owners and renters. Many of the residences in the Tin City neighborhoods are established but not old, having been built between 1970 and 1999. A number of residences were also built between 1940 and 1969. Home and apartment vacancy rates are 7.2% in Tin City. Neighborhood Scout analysis shows that this rate is lower than 52.8% of the neighborhoods in the nation, approximately near the middle range for vacancies.

==== River Landing ====
River Landing is a private community of Wallace. The community mainly consist of retirees. The community has a two 18-hole championship golf courses, clubhouse, pools, expansive homesites, and scenic walking and biking trails.

==== Northeast ====
Northeast is home to the Northeast Volunteer Fire Department that provides fire and emergency services to this unincorporated community of Wallace, Duplin County, North Carolina and surrounding rural areas.

==== Rockfish ====
Rockfish is a township located in Wallace, Duplin County, North Carolina with a population of 1,667.

==== Island Creek ====
Island Creek is a township located in Wallace, Duplin County, North Carolina.

==== Deep Bottom / Pin Hook ====
Pinhook/Deep Bottom is a rural neighborhood in Wallace.

=== Military ===
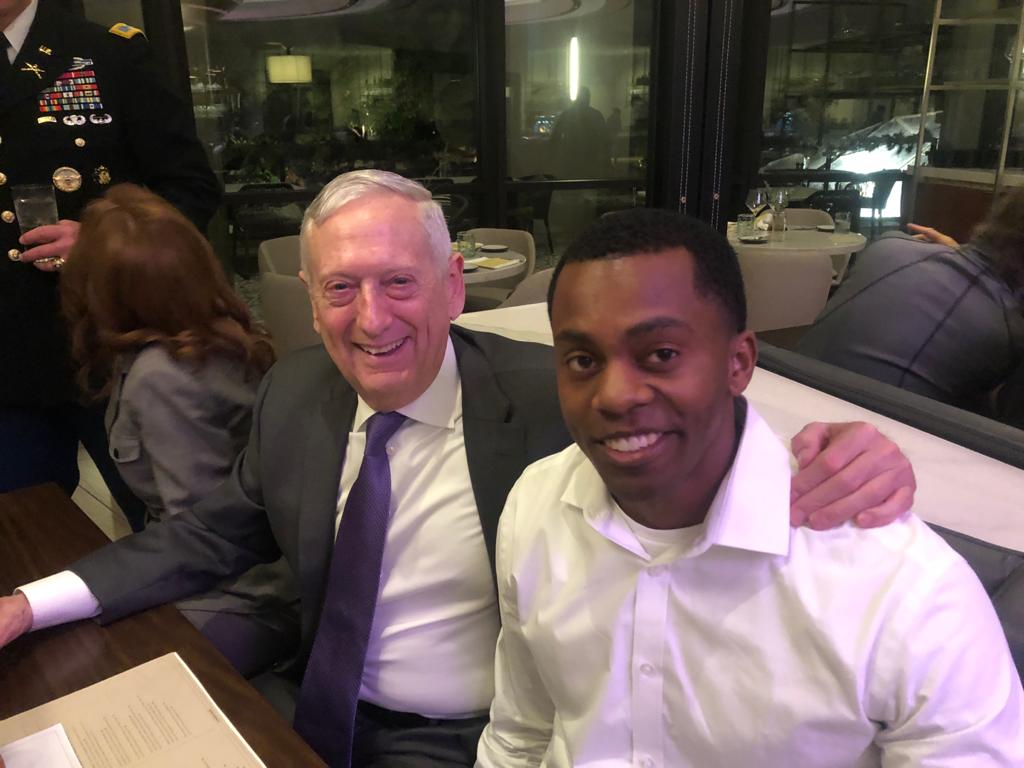
Matthew R. Walker, a resident of Wallace and Army Veteran, pictured with former United States Secretary of Defense James N. Mattis

Wallace is home to hundreds of Veterans of the United States Armed Forces. In 2022, an estimated 13.6% of the population were military veterans. Wallace is within a two-hour drive from all eight military bases located in North Carolina

Wallace was the location of an armory and detachment of the North Carolina National Guard's 1st Battalion, 120th Infantry Regiment. On June 29, 2016, the armory was transferred to the town of Wallace. The town converted the armory to a public works facility.

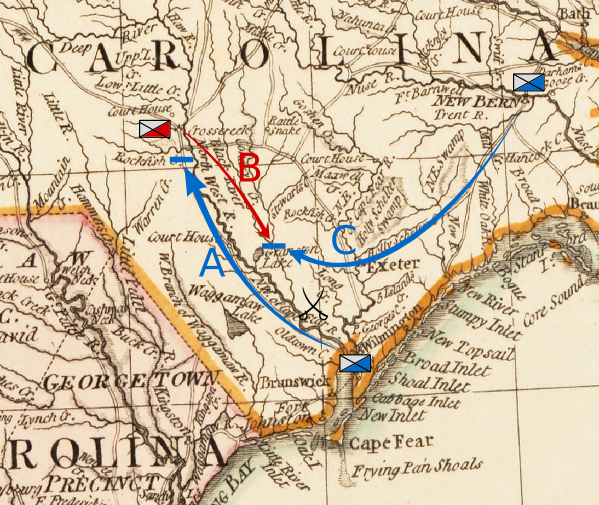
Revolutionary War Map depicting preliminary movements: A: Moore moves from Wilmington to Rockfish Creek B: MacDonald moves to Corbett's Ferry C: Caswell moves from New Bern to Corbett's Ferry

== Schools ==
- Wallace-Rose Hill High School (9–12) (Teachey, NC)
- Wallace Elementary School (Pre-K-8)
- New Hope Christian Academy
- Wallace Christian Academy

== Attractions ==
- Carolina Strawberry Festival
- Boney Mill Pond
- Historic Depot
- The Wallace Community Center at the Historic Wallace Woman's Club Building
- The Wanoca Outdoor Theatre
- The Stockyard
- Battle of Rockfish Creek Historic Site

== Notable people ==
- Henry Boney (1903–2002), Major League Baseball pitcher
- Wray Carlton (born 1937), former running back for the Buffalo Bills
- M. L. Carr (born 1951), NBA player and two-time NBA champion
- Nate Irving (born 1988), NFL linebacker
- James R. Jordan Sr. (1936–1993), father of NBA star Michael Jordan
- Mary Lee Mills (1912–2010), American nurse
- Charles S. Murphy (1909–1983), White House Counsel to U.S. President Harry S. Truman
- Javonte Williams (born 2000), running back for the Denver Broncos and Dallas Cowboys.

== Radio stations ==
- 710 AM / 100.5 FM WKOO KIX FM – Country & Dance Hits (AM tower in Rose Hill on Highway 117, FM tower near River Landing in Wallace)
- 90.9 FM WGXO Go Mix! – Southern gospel (tower located near River Landing in Wallace, operates on same tower as 100.5 FM)
- 94.3 FM WZKB La Mega – Regional Mexican (tower located near Stockyards in Wallace)

== Transportation ==
Wallace is home to Henderson Field Airport a public airport located one mile (1.6 km) southwest of the central business district (CBD) of Wallace. The airport is undergoing expansion operations to enhance the airport's ability to serve the surrounding community.

Wallace was included as a potential passenger rail stop in the 2024 Southeastern North Carolina Passenger Rail Feasibility Study to reestablish the passenger rail link from Raleigh to Wilmington.
