= National Register of Historic Places listings in Cumberland County, North Carolina =

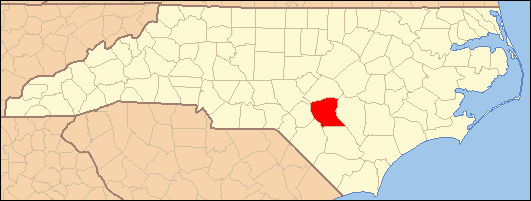

This list includes properties and districts listed on the National Register of Historic Places in Cumberland County, North Carolina, United States. Click the "Map of all coordinates" link to the right to view an online map of all properties and districts with latitude and longitude coordinates in the table below.

== Current listings ==
This National Park Service list is complete through NPS recent listings posted September 4, 2026.

	Name on the Register	Image	Date listed	Location	City or town	Description
1	Atlantic Coast Line Railroad Station	Atlantic Coast Line Railroad Station	July 7, 1982 (#82001294)	472 Hay St. 35°03′18″N 78°53′05″W	Fayetteville	
2	Barge's Tavern	Barge's Tavern	July 7, 1983 (#83001843)	519 Ramsey St. 35°03′39″N 78°52′42″W	Fayetteville	
3	Belden-Horne House	Belden-Horne House	March 16, 1972 (#72000955)	519 Ramsey St. 35°03′39″N 78°52′42″W	Fayetteville	
4	Big Rockfish Presbyterian Church	Big Rockfish Presbyterian Church	July 21, 1983 (#83001844)	SR 2268; 34°57′06″N 78°55′27″W	Hope Mills	
5	Broadell Historic District		September 8, 2026 (#100013397)	Roughly bound by Seabrook Road. Gola Drive. Bessemer Circle. Corrinna Street Cascade Street. and Marion Court; 35°05′01″N 78°53′33″W	Fayetteville	
6	Brownlea	Brownlea	August 21, 2003 (#03000803)	405 Southampton Court; 35°03′08″N 78°54′53″W	Fayetteville	
7	Camp Ground Methodist Church	Camp Ground Methodist Church	July 7, 1983 (#83001845)	Camp Ground Rd. 35°04′04″N 78°58′22″W	Fayetteville	
8	Cape Fear and Yadkin Valley Railway Passenger Depot	Cape Fear and Yadkin Valley Railway Passenger Depot	July 7, 1983 (#83001846)	148 Maxwell St. 35°03′08″N 78°52′56″W	Fayetteville	
9	Cape Fear Baptist Church	Cape Fear Baptist Church	October 13, 1983 (#83003816)	SR 2233; 34°54′21″N 78°49′37″W	Grays Creek	
10	The Capitol	The Capitol	May 4, 2005 (#05000376)	126 Hay St. 35°03′18″N 78°52′45″W	Fayetteville	
11	Carolina Theater	Carolina Theater	July 7, 1983 (#83001847)	443 Hay St. 35°03′15″N 78°53′01″W	Fayetteville	Destroyed
12	Confederate Breastworks	Confederate Breastworks	October 7, 1981 (#81000421)	2300 Ramsey St. 35°05′19″N 78°52′34″W	Fayetteville	
13	Cool Spring Place	Cool Spring Place	October 10, 1972 (#72000956)	119 N. Cool Spring St. 35°03′08″N 78°52′30″W	Fayetteville	
14	Cool Springs		September 19, 1985 (#85002417)	Off SR 1607 at Cumberland; 35°14′02″N 78°52′29″W	Carvers Creek	
15	Cross Creek Cemetery Number One	Cross Creek Cemetery Number One	September 25, 1998 (#98001209)	Junction of N. Cool Spring and Grove St. 35°03′17″N 78°52′23″W	Fayetteville	Also see Cross Creek Cemetery
16	Cumberland County Courthouse	Cumberland County Courthouse	May 10, 1979 (#79001696)	Franklin, Gillespie, and Russell Sts. 35°03′05″N 78°52′45″W	Fayetteville	part of the North Carolina County Courthouses Thematic Resource
17	John Davis House	John Davis House	July 7, 1983 (#83001848)	910 Arsenal Ave. 35°03′18″N 78°53′45″W	Fayetteville	
18	Devane-MacQueen House		July 21, 1983 (#83001849)	NC 87; 34°52′50″N 78°50′33″W	Grays Creek	
19	Ellerslie		August 7, 1974 (#74001344)	West of Linden on SR 1607 at the junction with SR 1606; 35°13′50″N 78°52′31″W	Linden	
20	Evans Metropolitan AME Zion Church	Evans Metropolitan AME Zion Church	July 7, 1983 (#83001850)	301 N. Cool Spring St. 35°03′12″N 78°52′53″W	Fayetteville	
21	Falcon Tabernacle	Falcon Tabernacle	October 11, 1983 (#83003814)	West St. 35°11′37″N 78°38′52″W	Falcon	
22	Fayetteville Downtown Historic District	Fayetteville Downtown Historic District	July 1, 1999 (#99000779)	Roughly along Hay, Person, Green, Gillespie, Bow, Old, W. Russell and Cool Spring Sts. 35°03′11″N 78°52′41″W	Fayetteville	
23	Fayetteville Ice and Manufacturing Company:Plant and Engineer's House		July 7, 1983 (#83001851)	436 Rowan St. and 438 Rowan St. 35°03′36″N 78°53′00″W	Fayetteville	
24	Fayetteville Mutual Insurance Company Building	Fayetteville Mutual Insurance Company Building	July 7, 1983 (#83001852)	320 Hay St. 35°03′14″N 78°52′54″W	Fayetteville	
25	Fayetteville Veterans Administration Hospital Historic District	Fayetteville Veterans Administration Hospital Historic District	September 19, 2012 (#12000799)	2300 Ramsey St. 35°05′19″N 78°52′34″W	Fayetteville	
26	Fayetteville Women's Club and Oval Ballroom	Fayetteville Women's Club and Oval Ballroom	February 6, 1973 (#73001330)	224 Dick St. 35°02′53″N 78°52′42″W	Fayetteville	Fayetteville Women's Club is also known as Sandford House
27	First Baptist Church	First Baptist Church	July 7, 1983 (#83001853)	200 Old St. 35°03′14″N 78°52′47″W	Fayetteville	
28	First Presbyterian Church	First Presbyterian Church	April 30, 1976 (#76001317)	Ann and Bow Sts. 35°03′12″N 78°52′32″W	Fayetteville	
29	Gully Mill		July 7, 1983 (#83001854)	S.R. 1839; 35°03′22″N 78°50′29″W	Fayetteville	
30	Hangars 4 and 5, Pope Air Force Base		January 16, 1991 (#90002153)	Bldg. 708, Pope AFB; 35°10′40″N 79°00′52″W	Fayetteville	
31	Hay Street Methodist Church	Hay Street Methodist Church	July 7, 1983 (#83001855)	Hay St. at Ray and Old Sts. 35°03′11″N 78°52′27″W	Fayetteville	
32	Haymount District	Haymount District	August 7, 1983 (#83001856)	Roughly Hillside Ave. from Bragg Boulevard to Purshing St. • Boundary increase (listed April 10, 2007, refnum 07000296): 100-200 blocks of Bradford Ave., 801 Hay St., and 801, 802, and 806 Arsenal Ave. 35°03′24″N 78°53′22″W	Fayetteville	
33	Holt-Harrison House	Holt-Harrison House	July 7, 1983 (#83001857)	806 Hay St. 35°03′22″N 78°53′33″W	Fayetteville	
34	Hope Mills Historic District	Hope Mills Historic District	July 9, 1985 (#85001515)	Roughly bounded by Seaboard Coastline RR tracks, Lakeview Rd., Little Creek and Cross St. 34°58′17″N 78°56′43″W	Hope Mills	
35	Kyle House	Kyle House	June 19, 1972 (#72000957)	234 Green St. 35°03′21″N 78°52′36″W	Fayetteville	
36	Liberty Row	Liberty Row	August 14, 1973 (#73001331)	N Side of the first block of Person St., bounded by Market Sq. and Liberty Point; 35°03′08″N 78°52′39″W	Fayetteville	
37	Long Valley Farm		June 6, 1994 (#94000032)	Carvers Creek State Park; 35°12′40″N 78°58′39″W	Spring Lake	
38	M & O Chevrolet Company	M & O Chevrolet Company	July 7, 1983 (#83001858)	412 W. Russell St. 35°03′11″N 78°53′05″W	Fayetteville	
39	Mansard Roof House	Mansard Roof House	March 20, 1973 (#73001332)	214 Mason St. 35°03′21″N 78°52′45″W	Fayetteville	
40	Market House	Market House	September 15, 1970 (#70000451)	Market Sq. 35°03′10″N 78°52′40″W	Fayetteville	
41	Market House Square District	Market House Square District	July 7, 1983 (#83001860)	Hay, Person, Green, and Gillespie Sts. 35°03′09″N 78°52′44″W	Fayetteville	
42	Massey Hill High School	Massey Hill High School	December 23, 2004 (#04001387)	1062 Southern Ave. 35°01′51″N 78°53′40″W	Fayetteville	
43	Maxwell House	Maxwell House	February 28, 1985 (#85000380)	Off NC 24; 35°01′18″N 78°43′23″W	Stedman	
44	McArthur-Council House		July 21, 1983 (#83001861)	SR 2244; 34°53′38″N 78°55′58″W	Grays Creek	
45	McCall House	McCall House	July 7, 1983 (#83001862)	822 Arsenal Ave. 35°03′18″N 78°53′39″W	Fayetteville	
46	William McDiarmid House	William McDiarmid House	July 7, 1983 (#83001863)	330 Dick St. 35°02′51″N 78°52′45″W	Fayetteville	
47	Henry McLean House	Henry McLean House	July 7, 1983 (#83001864)	1006 Hay St. 35°03′24″N 78°53′49″W	Fayetteville	
48	Nimocks House	Nimocks House	January 20, 1972 (#72000958)	225 Dick St. 35°03′01″N 78°52′34″W	Fayetteville	
49	North Carolina Arsenal Site	North Carolina Arsenal Site	February 23, 1983 (#83001865)	Arsenal Park, behind the Museum of the Cape Fear Historical Complex; 35°03′14″N 78°53′41″W	Fayetteville	Remains of a US (and later Confederate) Army arsenal
50	Oak Grove		February 6, 1973 (#73001329)	South of Erwin near the junction of NC 82 and SR 1875; 35°15′00″N 78°41′25″W	Erwin	
51	John A. Oates House		July 7, 1983 (#83001866)	406 St. James Sq. 35°03′26″N 78°52′35″W	Fayetteville	
52	Old Bluff Presbyterian Church	Old Bluff Presbyterian Church	August 7, 1974 (#74001345)	North of Wade on SR 1709; 35°11′02″N 78°43′25″W	Wade	
53	Orange Street School	Orange Street School	September 22, 1987 (#87001597)	500 block of Orange St., at the junction of Orange and Chance Sts. 35°03′50″N 78°52′49″W	Fayetteville	
54	John E. Patterson House	John E. Patterson House	July 7, 1983 (#83001867)	445 Moore St. 35°03′42″N 78°53′01″W	Fayetteville	
55	Phoenix Masonic Lodge No. 8	Phoenix Masonic Lodge No. 8	July 7, 1983 (#83001868)	221 Mason St. 35°03′21″N 78°52′48″W	Fayetteville	
56	Edgar Allan Poe House	Edgar Allan Poe House	July 7, 1983 (#83001869)	206 Bradford Ave. 35°03′14″N 78°52′47″W	Fayetteville	
57	Pope Air Force Base Historic District		January 25, 1991 (#90002152)	Bldgs. 300, 302, 306, and Old Family Housing Units; 35°10′13″N 79°00′13″W	Fayetteville	
58	Prince Charles Hotel	Prince Charles Hotel	July 7, 1983 (#83001870)	430 Hay St. 35°03′16″N 78°53′00″W	Fayetteville	built 1925; also known as Hotel Prince Charles;
59	Sedberry-Holmes House	Sedberry-Holmes House	September 2, 1975 (#75001252)	232 Person St. 35°03′04″N 78°52′33″W	Fayetteville	
60	Seventy-First Consolidated School	Seventy-First Consolidated School	December 23, 2004 (#04001388)	6830 Raeford Rd. 35°02′17″N 79°00′34″W	Fayetteville	
61	Dr. Ezekiel Ezra Smith House	Dr. Ezekiel Ezra Smith House	May 13, 2015 (#15000237)	135 S. Blount St. 35°02′48″N 78°52′56″W	Fayetteville	
62	St. John's Episcopal Church	St. John's Episcopal Church	September 6, 1974 (#74001343)	Green St. 35°03′18″N 78°52′38″W	Fayetteville	
63	St. Joseph's Episcopal Church	St. Joseph's Episcopal Church	June 1, 1982 (#82003447)	Ramsey and Moore Sts. 35°03′21″N 78°52′41″W	Fayetteville	
64	Frank H. Stedman House	Frank H. Stedman House	September 14, 2002 (#02000966)	1516 Morganton Rd. 35°03′30″N 78°54′18″W	Fayetteville	
65	Robert Strange Country House	Robert Strange Country House	July 7, 1983 (#83001871)	309 Kirkland Dr. 35°05′30″N 78°52′28″W	Fayetteville	
66	Taylor-Utley House	Taylor-Utley House	July 7, 1983 (#83001872)	916 Hay St. 35°03′23″N 78°53′46″W	Fayetteville	
67	U.S. Post Office	U.S. Post Office	July 7, 1983 (#83001873)	301 Hay St. 35°03′12″N 78°52′53″W	Fayetteville	Currently home of the Arts Council of Fayetteville/Cumberland County
68	Dr. William C. Verdery House	Dr. William C. Verdery House	September 5, 2007 (#07000904)	1428 Raeford Rd. 35°03′25″N 78°54′16″W	Fayetteville	
69	Waddill's Store	Waddill's Store	July 7, 1983 (#83001874)	220 Hay St. 35°03′12″N 78°52′49″W	Fayetteville	
70	Westlawn		September 22, 1980 (#80002815)	1505 Fort Bragg Rd. 35°03′33″N 78°54′22″W	Fayetteville	
71	Robert Williams House		July 21, 1983 (#83001875)	SR 1728; 35°05′16″N 78°48′56″W	Eastover	

== Former listings ==
	Name on the Register	Image	Date listed	Date removed	Location	City or town	Description
1	Mallett House		July 7, 1983 (#83001859)	July 9, 1986	2720 Florence Dr.	Fayetteville	Removed from Register in 1986 due to relocation to the Methodist University campus.

== See also ==
- National Register of Historic Places listings in North Carolina
- List of National Historic Landmarks in North Carolina
