= Timeline of Fayetteville, North Carolina =

The following is a timeline of the history of the city of Fayetteville, North Carolina, USA.

== Prior to 20th century ==
- 1780 - Methodist Church established.
- 1783 - Cross Creek and Campbellton combine to become the town of "Fayetteville."
- 1789
  - November 21: North Carolina convention ratifies the U.S. Constitution.
  - Fayetteville Gazette newspaper begins publication.
  - Fayetteville becomes capital of the state of North Carolina; State House built.
- 1793 - Fayetteville Independent Light Infantry established.
- 1794
  - Legislature moves to Raleigh.
  - Fayetteville Library Society incorporated.
- 1799 - Fayetteville Seminary founded.
- 1820 - Population: 3,532.
- 1830
  - Fayetteville Female Society of Industry established.
  - Population: 2,868.
- 1831 - May 29: Fire.
- 1840 - Population: 4,285.
- 1845
  - June 6: Fire.
  - Fayetteville Library Institute founded.
- 1858 - Fayetteville Gas Company established.
- 1865 - March 14: Fayetteville occupied by Union Army.
- 1871 - Knights of Pythias established.
- 1877 - "State normal school for negroes" established.
- 1899 - Fayetteville Chamber of Commerce formed.

== 20th century ==
- 1906
  - Thomas Jefferson Powers becomes mayor.
  - Woman's Club of Fayetteville founded.
- 1907 - Hannibal Lafayette Godwin becomes U.S. representative for North Carolina's 6th congressional district.
- 1910 - Congregation Beth Israel established.
- 1915 - Orange Street School and Confederate Women's Home established.
- 1918 - U.S. military Camp Bragg established near Fayetteville.
- 1921 - Fayetteville YMCA, and Fayetteville Business & Professional Women's Club founded.
- 1925
  - Mission of M.E. Church established.
  - Prince Charles Hotel built.
- 1926 - Cumberland County Courthouse built.
- 1927 - Carolina Theater built.
- 1932 - Public library established.
- 1935 - Fayetteville Little Theatre begins operating.
- 1939
  - National Association for the Advancement of Colored People chapter formed.
  - WFNC radio begins broadcasting.
- 1941 - Colony Theater opens.
- 1945 - Sodder Fire - 'Death' of 5 Children
- 1948 - WFLB radio begins broadcasting.
- 1951 - U.S. military XVIII Airborne Corps headquartered at nearby Fort Bragg.
- 1952 - U.S. military Psychological Warfare Center established at nearby Fort Bragg.
- 1953 - High school opens.
- 1956
  - Fayetteville Symphony Orchestra established.
  - Methodist College (Now Methodist University) chartered.
- 1960 - February 10: Fayetteville sit-ins begin during Civil Rights Movement.
- 1961 - Industrial Education Center established.
- 1969 - Fayetteville State University active.
- 1975 - Cross Creek Mall in business.
- 1982 - Second Harvest Food Bank of Southeast North Carolina established.
- 1986 - Fayetteville Detention Center privatised.
- 1987 - David Price becomes U.S. representative for North Carolina's 4th congressional district.
- 1988
  - Fayetteville Technical Community College active.
  - Museum of the Cape Fear Historical Complex established.
- 1989
  - Cape Fear Botanical Garden established.
  - Monarch Stadium (Methodist) opens.

== 21st century ==
- 2000 - City website online.
- 2001 - Marshall Pitts Jr. becomes mayor.
- 2005 - Tony Chavonne becomes mayor.
- 2010 - Population: 200,564.
- 2013 - Nat Robertson becomes mayor.*
- 2017 - Mitch Colvin become mayor.*

== See also ==
- Fayetteville history
- List of mayors of Fayetteville, North Carolina
- Cumberland County history
- National Register of Historic Places listings in Cumberland County, North Carolina
- Timelines of other cities in North Carolina: Asheville, Charlotte, Durham, Greensboro, Raleigh, Wilmington, Winston-Salem

== Bibliography ==
- R.H. Long (1863), "Fayetteville", Hunt's Gazetteer of the Border and Southern States, Pittsburgh, Pa.: John P. Hunt
- Federal Writers’ Project (1939). "Fayetteville". North Carolina: A Guide to the Old North State. American Guide Series. p. 196+ – via Open Library.. + Chronology
- John Oates. The Story of Fayetteville and the Upper Cape Fear (Fayetteville, 1981)
- Fred Whitted (2000). Fayetteville, North Carolina. Black America. Charleston, South Carolina: Arcadia.
- Roy Parker Jr. (2006), "Fayetteville", in William S. Powell (ed.), Encyclopedia of North Carolina, University of North Carolina Press
- Raj Chetty; Nathaniel Hendren (2015), City Rankings, Commuting Zones: Causal Effects of the 100 Largest Commuting Zones on Household Income in Adulthood, Equality of Opportunity Project, Harvard University, archived from the original on May 6, 2015, "Rank #100: Fayetteville, North Carolina"
