= Camp Ground =

Camp Ground may refer to:

- Campsite, a dedicated area for overnight camping
- Camp Ground, Illinois, an unincorporated community
- Camp Ground Methodist Church, a historic church in North Carolina
