= Verdery =

Verdery is a surname. Notable people with the surname include:

- Benjamin Verdery (born 1955), American classical guitarist
- Emily Verdery Battey (1826–1912), American journalist
- Katherine Verdery (born 1948), American anthropologist and author

== See also ==
- Dr. William C. Verdery House
