= Ice plant =

Ice plant or iceplant may refer to:

== Plant common names ==
- Aizoaceae, the ice plant family
  - Carpobrotus edulis, native to South Africa, and invasive in Australia, California in the US, and the Mediterranean
  - Conicosia, narrow-leafed ice plants
  - Delosperma cooperi, Cooper's ice plant
  - Delosperma bosseranum, a Delosperma species
  - Disphyma, a genus of iceplants common to Australia, New Zealand, and southern Africa
  - Dorotheanthus bellidiformis
  - Lampranthus, species
  - Mesembryanthemum, ice plant
  - Mesembryanthemum crystallinum (syn. Cryophytum crystallinum), common ice plant
- Hylotelephium spectabile, a plant in the stonecrop family, Crassulaceae
- Solanum sisymbriifolium, fire and ice plant

== Ice manufacturers ==
- Commercial production of ice
  - Punta Gorda Ice Plant, a historic ice plant in Punta Gorda, Florida
  - Florida Power and Light Company Ice Plant, a historic site in Melbourne, Florida
  - Chrystal Water and Power Company-Spencer Water and Ice Company, also known as Spencer Ice Plant, a historic power station and ice manufacturing plant in West Virginia
  - Fayetteville Ice and Manufacturing Company: Plant and Engineer's House, a historic ice plant in Fayetteville, North Carolina
  - Metz Ice Plant, a historic ice plant in Milford, Pennsylvania
