= Westlawn =

Westlawn may refer to:

- Westlawn (Fayetteville, North Carolina), listed on the NRHP in North Carolina
- Westlawn (Wallingford, Pennsylvania), listed on the NRHP in Pennsylvania
