= Ice flower =

Ice flower may refer to:

- Window frost
- Frost flower, thin layers of ice extruded from a plant
- Ice plant (disambiguation), a variety of plants which go by this term
