= St. John's Episcopal Church (Fayetteville, North Carolina) =

Historic church in North Carolina, United States

- U.S. National Register of Historic Places
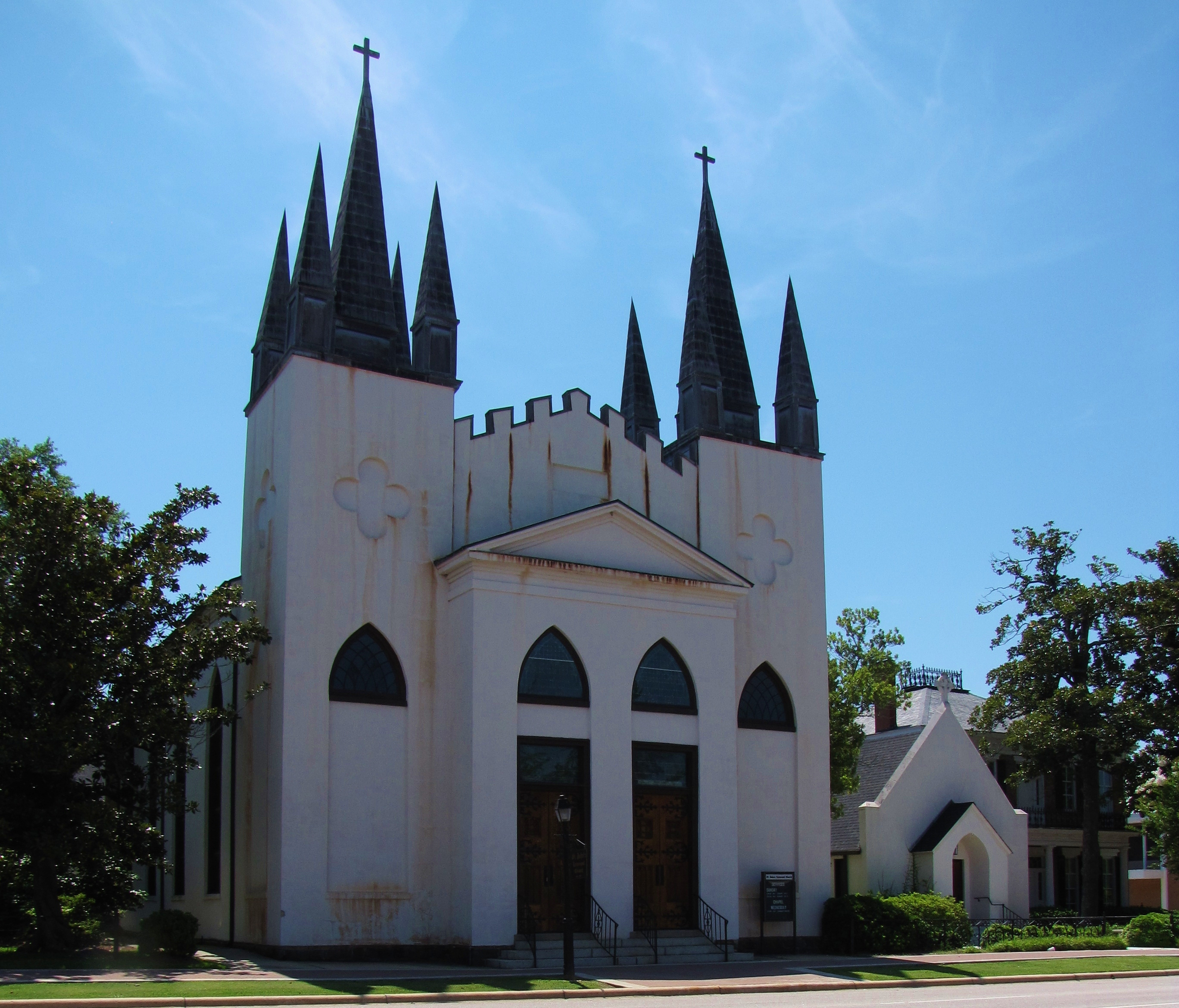
- St. John's Episcopal Church

- Location within North Carolina Location within the United States
- Location: 302 Green Street; Fayetteville; North Carolina
- Coordinates: 35°3′18″N 78°52′38″W
- Built: 1832
- Architectural style: Gothic Revival
- NRHP reference No.: 74001343
- Added to NRHP: September 6, 1974

St. John's Episcopal Church in Fayetteville, North Carolina is a congregation of the Episcopal Diocese of East Carolina, a division of the Episcopal Church in the United States of America. Founded in 1817, it is located on Green Street in historic downtown Fayetteville. The congregation was formally organized April 7, 1817, and it became the first Episcopal church in the city. It is listed in the National Register of Historic Places. Public tours are available by appointment.

== History ==
=== Organization ===
When the city was founded, Fayetteville's Episcopalian families had no congregation of their own. Because the town's population was mainly of Scottish descent, Episcopalians typically worshiped together with the Presbyterians. In 1816, John Winslow went to Wilmington to consult the Rev. Dr. Bethell Judd, and the following year St. John's Episcopal Church was founded in Fayetteville. The Rev. Dr. Judd became the church's first rector.

=== Original church ===
The foundations of the original church building were laid in 1817 by the local chapter of the Masonic Order. The church had a single spire which housed the town clock, and the total cost was about $16,000. In 1831 the Great Fire destroyed the church building, along with hundreds of other historic downtown sites.

=== Current building and recent renovations ===
The current church was constructed in 1832. The main church, which has a seating capacity of over 400 people, features stained glass windows from Munich, Germany depicting Biblical scenes. The Chapel of the Beloved Disciple provides a more intimate setting for smaller services. In 1990, St. John's purchased the Kyle House, a 139-year-old home adjacent to the church which is often used for receptions, classes, and meetings. In 2002, the parish dedicated a building project which connected the original church structure to the Kyle House. The project also included the addition of a gymnasium, a pre-school facility, and an expanded fellowship hall.

=== Rectors ===
St. John's has had nineteen rectors since its organization.

- The Rev. Bethel Judd (1817–1818)
- The Rev. Gregory T. Bedell (1818–1822)
- The Rev. William Hooper (1822–1824)
- The Rev. Henry M. Mason (1825–1827)
- The Rev. Philip B. Wiley (1828–1830)
- The Rev. William G. H. Jones (1830-1831)
- The Rev. Jarvis B. Buxton (1831–1851)
- The Rev. Joseph Caldwell Huske (1851–1888)
- The Rev. Thomas Atkinson, Jr. (1888–1893)
- The Rev. Isaac Wayne Hughes (1894–1909)
- The Rev. Charles Tyndall (1910–1912)
- The Rev. Archie Boogher (1912–1938)
- The Rev. Tate Young (1938–1942)
- The Rev. J. F. Ferneyhough (1943–1954)
- The Rev. Roscoe C. Hauser, Jr. (1954–1974)
- The Rev. Robert L. Ladehoff (1974–1985)
- The Rev. David M. Chamberlain (1987–2002)
- The Rev. Louanne Mabry-Loch (2003–2007)
- The Rev. Robert M. Alves (2009-present)

== Worship ==
The Eucharist is always at the center of worship at St. John's. The church generally has a Broad Church to High Church style of worship, with the vast majority of services following a formal, traditional format. Both the Rite I and the Rite II forms of worship from the Book of Common Prayer are used. St. John's recently began a contemporary service on Wednesday evenings.

== Preschool ==
St. John's also operates a nondenominational, Christian preschool for children ages 6 months through four years of age. The preschool is in its ninth year of operation.

== See also ==
- National Register of Historic Places listings in Cumberland County, North Carolina
