= CGMC =

CGMC may refer to:

- Camp Ground Methodist Church, an American historic church
- Chicago Gay Men's Chorus, an American vocal group
- Connecticut Gay Men's Chorus, an American vocal group
