= F. Ertel Carlyle =

American politician

Frank E. Carlyle
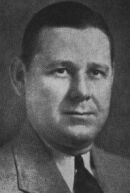

Member of the U.S. House of Representatives from North Carolina's 6th district
- In office January 3, 1949 – January 3, 1957
- Preceded by: J. Bayard Clark
- Succeeded by: Alton A. Lennon

Personal details
- Born: Frank Ertel Carlyle; April 4, 1897 Lumberton, North Carolina
- Died: October 2, 1960 (aged 63) Lumberton, NC
- Party: Democratic

Frank Ertel Carlyle (April 7, 1897 – October 2, 1960) was an American lawyer and World War I veteran who served four terms as a United States representative of the Democratic Party from the state of North Carolina from 1949 to 1957.

== Career ==
Carlyle graduated from the University of North Carolina at Chapel Hill.

After serving in the US Navy during World War I he practiced law in Lumberton, North Carolina and served as the solicitor of the 9th judicial district of North Carolina.

=== Congress ===
In 1948, Carlyle was elected to the 81st United States Congress. He would serve three more terms before losing re-election in 1956. He was a signatory to the 1956 Southern Manifesto that opposed the desegregation of public schools ordered by the Supreme Court in Brown v. Board of Education.

U.S. House of Representatives
Preceded by J. Bayard Clark	Member of the U.S. House of Representatives from North Carolina's 7th congressional district 1949-1957	Succeeded by Alton A. Lennon
