= Dr. Ezekiel Ezra Smith House =

Historic house in North Carolina, United States

- U.S. National Register of Historic Places
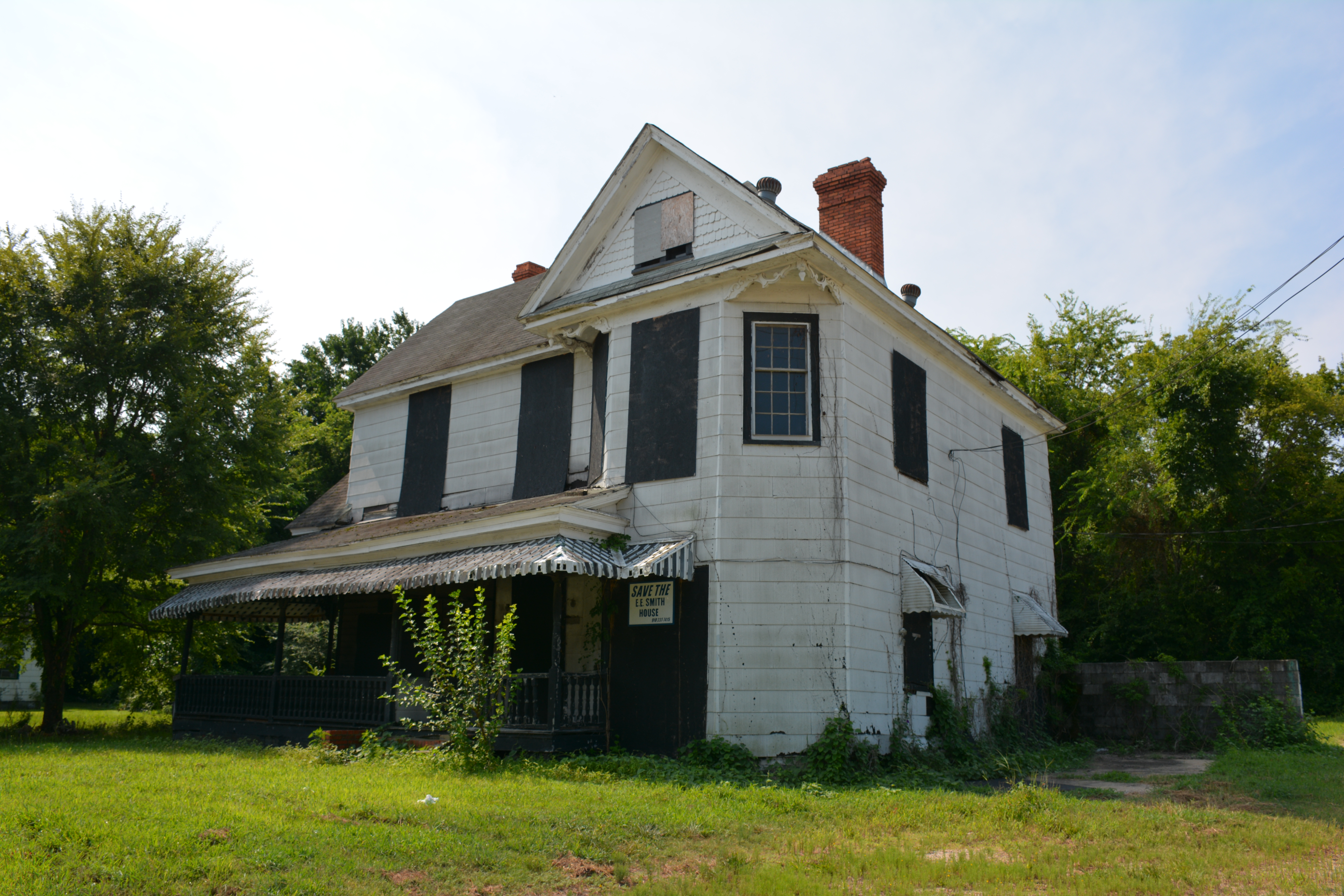

- Location within North Carolina Location within the United States
- Location: 135 S. Blount St., Fayetteville, North Carolina
- Coordinates: 35°2′48″N 78°52′56″W
- Area: less than one acre
- Built: 1902
- NRHP reference No.: 15000237
- Added to NRHP: May 13, 2015

The Dr. Ezekiel Ezra Smith House is a historic house at 135 South Blount Street in Fayetteville, North Carolina. It is a 2 1/2-story wood-frame structure, with complex massing typical of the Queen Anne architectural style. Its main block has a side-gable roof, with a projecting bay section at the right of the front facade that is topped by a gable. A hip roof porch extends from the center of the projecting bay around to the left side. The house was built in 1902, and is unusual as a Queen Anne house in one of the city's historical African-American neighborhoods. Dr. Ezekiel Ezra Smith, for whom the house was built, was instrumental in the development of North Carolina's first State Colored Normal School (for the training of African-American teachers), established in Fayetteville in 1877.

The house was listed on the National Register of Historic Places in 2015.

== See also ==
- National Register of Historic Places listings in Cumberland County, North Carolina
