= Fayetteville Downtown Historic District =

Historic district in North Carolina, United States

- U.S. National Register of Historic Places
- U.S. Historic district
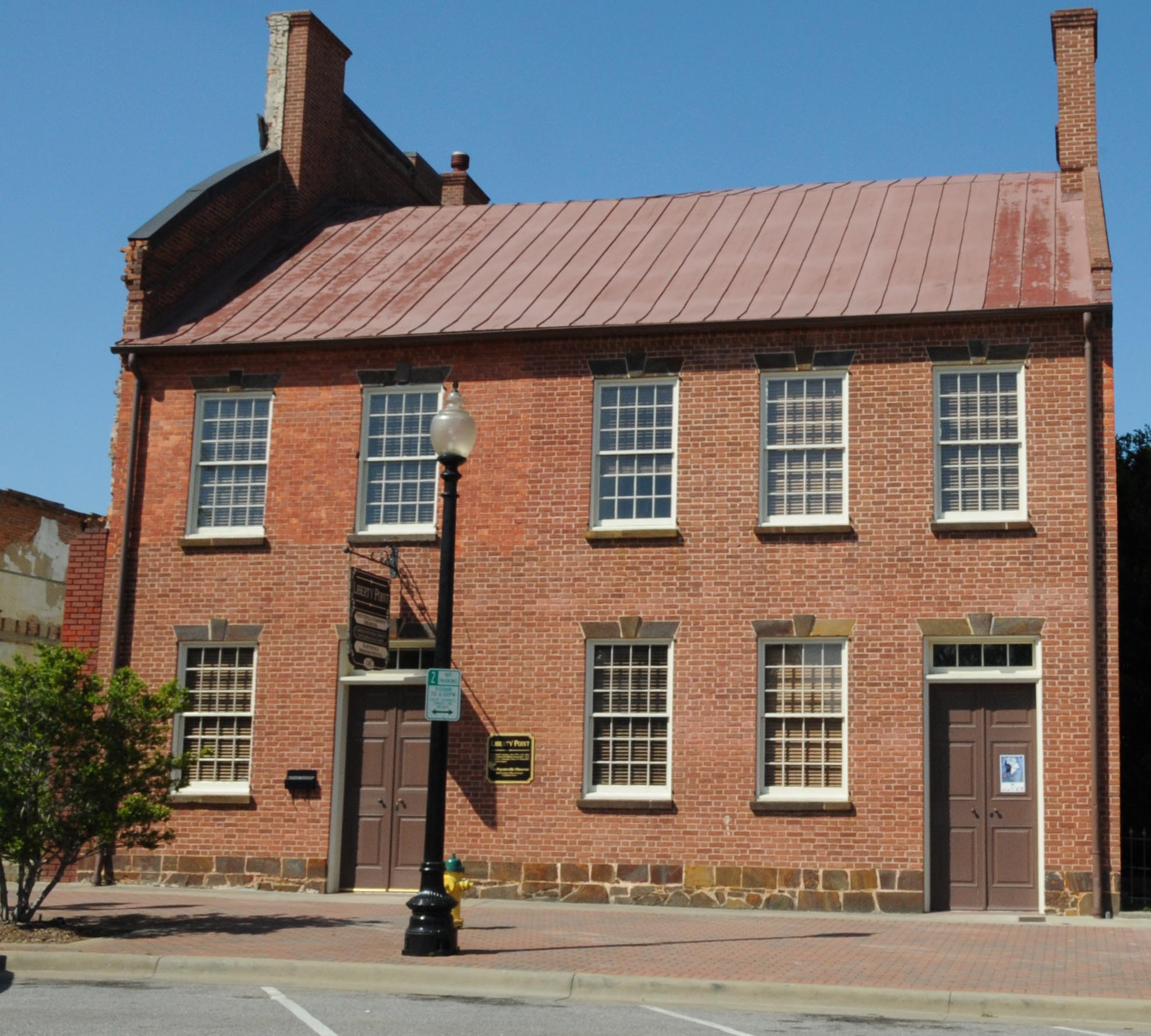
- Liberty Point, the oldest building in the district

- Location within North Carolina Location within the United States
- Location: Roughly along Hay, Person, Green, Gillespie, Bow, Old, W. Russell and Cool Spring Sts., Fayetteville, North Carolina
- Coordinates: 35°3′11″N 78°52′41″W
- Area: 59 acres (24 ha)
- Built: 1786
- Architect: Barton, Harry; Davis, A.J., et al.
- Architectural style: Early Commercial, Classical Revival, et al
- NRHP reference No.: 99000779
- Added to NRHP: July 1, 1999

Fayetteville Downtown Historic District is a national historic district located in Fayetteville, Cumberland County, North Carolina. It encompasses 113 contributing buildings, 3 contributing sites, 1 contributing structure, and 2 contributing objects in the central business district of Fayetteville. The district includes commercial buildings, government and civic buildings, railroad-related structures, residential dwellings, churches and the Cross Creek Cemetery. They range in build date from the 1780s to 1949. The district includes the previously listed Liberty Row and Market House Square District and 16 resources listed as part of the "Historic Resources of Fayetteville," a Multiple Resource Nomination.

It was listed on the National Register of Historic Places in 1999.
