= Market House Square District =

Historic district in North Carolina, United States

- U.S. National Register of Historic Places
- U.S. Historic district
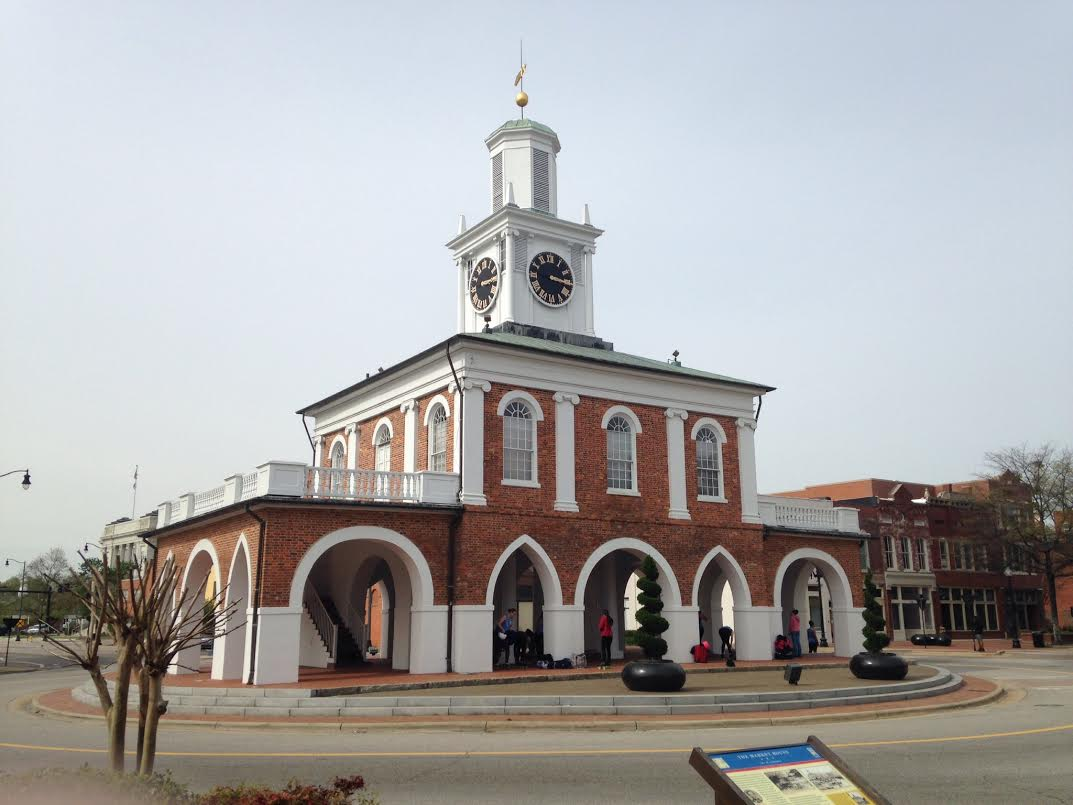
- Market House Square District, September 2014

- Location within North Carolina Location within the United States
- Location: Hay, Person, Green, and Gillespie Sts., Fayetteville, North Carolina
- Coordinates: 35°3′9″N 78°52′44″W
- Area: 4.9 acres (2.0 ha)
- Architect: Hartmann, Charles C.
- Architectural style: Late 19th And 20th Century Revivals, Late Victorian
- MPS: Fayetteville MRA
- NRHP reference No.: 83001860
- Added to NRHP: July 7, 1983

Market House Square District is a national historic district located at Fayetteville, Cumberland County, North Carolina. It encompasses 11 contributing buildings in the central business district of Fayetteville. The district includes six storefronts and a major store, an office building, a former Knights of Pythias Building, and the First Citizen's Bank Building, all of which date between 1884 and 1926 and ring the separately listed Market House. The First Citizen's Bank Building was designed by architect Charles C. Hartmann and built in 1926.

Although all of the original buildings were lost in Fayetteville's devastating fire of 1831, replacements were built at the same locations, with one exception. There was no sense in rebuilding the former capitol, although when the capitol in Raleigh also burned soon afterwards some in Fayetteville had fantasies of getting the capital moved back. Instead they built a Market House, with covered space for commercial activities—since all the stores in Fayetteville had been burned. Above it were meeting rooms, where the town and county business could be done. It remained the center of Fayetteville.

The district was listed on the National Register of Historic Places in 1983. It is incorporated into the Fayetteville Downtown Historic District.
