= J. Bayard Clark =

American politician

Member of the U.S. House of Representatives from North Carolina's 7th district
- In office March 4, 1933 – January 3, 1949
- Preceded by: Walter Lambeth
- Succeeded by: F. Ertel Carlyle

Member of the U.S. House of Representatives from North Carolina's 6th district
- In office March 4, 1929 – March 3, 1933
- Preceded by: Homer L. Lyon
- Succeeded by: William B. Umstead

Member of the North Carolina House of Representatives
- In office 1915

Personal details
- Born: Jerome Bayard Clark; April 5, 1882 near Elizabethtown, North Carolina, U.S.
- Died: August 26, 1959 (aged 77) Fayetteville, North Carolina, U.S.
- Resting place: Cross Creek Cemetery, Fayetteville, North Carolina, U.S.
- Party: Democratic
- Spouse: Helen Purdie Robinson
- Children: 4
- Education: Davidson College; University of North Carolina at Chapel Hill
- Profession: Politician, lawyer

Jerome Bayard Clark (April 5, 1882 – August 26, 1959) was a U.S. representative from North Carolina.

== Early life ==
Born on Phoebus Plantation near Elizabethtown, North Carolina, Clark attended Davidson College, where he was a member of the Pi Kappa Alpha fraternity, and the University of North Carolina at Chapel Hill, where he studied law. Clark was admitted to the bar in 1906 and commenced practice in Elizabethtown, North Carolina. He married Helen Purdie Robinson and they had four children: Martha Holton Clark, Jerome Bayard Clark Jr., Heman Robinson Clark, and Helen Purdie Clark. From 1910 to 1920 Clark served as president of the Bank of Elizabethtown, and in the state House of Representatives in 1915.

Clark then moved to Fayetteville, North Carolina, in 1920 and continued the practice of law, serving as a member of the State Democratic committee from 1909 to 1919 and, later, as a member of the North Carolina State Judicial Conference from 1924 to 1928.

Clark was an avid sailor, outdoorsman and noted short story writer. Many of his tales were published in The Blade Journal under his pen name, Mr. Bide. A nature park (Clark Park) is named in his honor in Fayetteville. His portrait is displayed in the Bladen County Courthouse in Elizabethtown.

== US Congress ==
Clark was elected as a Democrat to the Seventy-first and to the nine succeeding Congresses (March 4, 1929 – January 3, 1949). Clark served as chairman of the Committee on Elections No. 1 (Seventy-second and Seventy-third Congresses).

Clark was not a candidate for renomination in 1948 and he resumed the practice of law. He died in Fayetteville, North Carolina, on August 26, 1959, and is interred in Cross Creek Cemetery No. 3.

== Sources ==
- United States Congress. "J. Bayard Clark (id: C000439)". Biographical Directory of the United States Congress.

U.S. House of Representatives
Preceded by Homer L. Lyon	Member of the U.S. House of Representatives from North Carolina's 6th congressional district 1929-1933	Succeeded by William B. Umstead
Preceded by Walter Lambeth	Member of the U.S. House of Representatives from North Carolina's 7th congressional district 1933-1949	Succeeded by Frank E. Carlyle
