= Devane-MacQueen House =

Historic house in North Carolina, United States

- U.S. National Register of Historic Places
- Location within North Carolina Location within the United States
- Location: NC 87, near Grays Creek, North Carolina
- Coordinates: 34°52′50″N 78°50′33″W
- Area: 26 acres (11 ha)
- Built: c. 1855
- Architectural style: Greek Revival
- NRHP reference No.: 83001849
- Added to NRHP: July 21, 1983

Devane-MacQueen House is a historic home located near Grays Creek, Cumberland County, North Carolina. It was built about 1855, and is a two-story, five-bay, Greek Revival style frame dwelling with a hipped roof. It has a double-pile central-hall plan. Also on the property are the contributing schoolhouse, chicken coop, smokehouse, two tobacco barns, and a two-story slave-turned-tenant house.

It was listed on the National Register of Historic Places in 1983.
