= Liberty Row =

Historic district in North Carolina, United States

- U.S. National Register of Historic Places
- U.S. Historic district
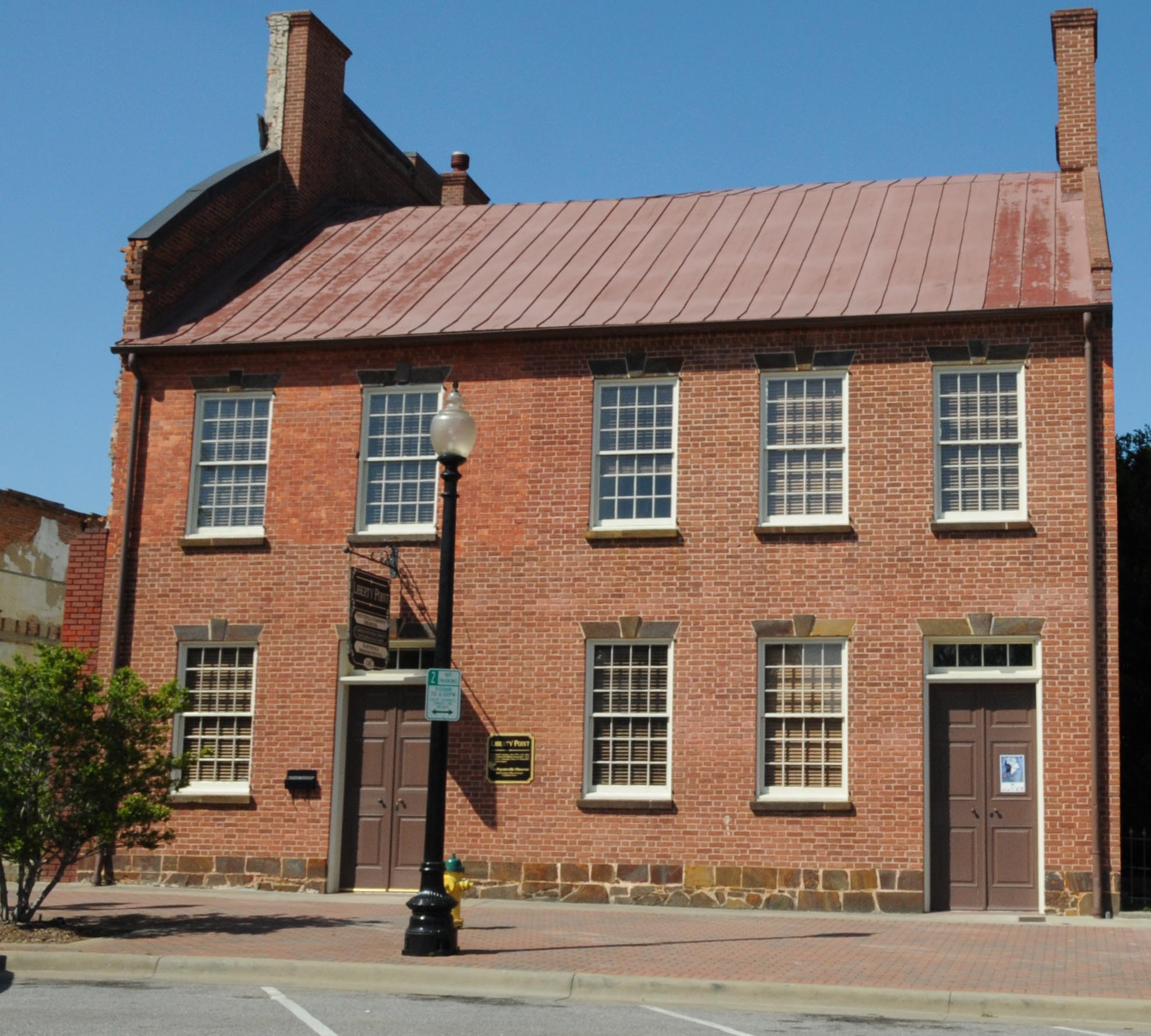
- Liberty Point (c. 1791), Fayetteville Downtown Historic District, April 2009

- Location within North Carolina Location within the United States
- Location: N Side of the first block of Person St., bounded by Market Sq. and Liberty Point, Fayetteville, North Carolina
- Coordinates: 35°3′08″N 78°52′39″W
- Area: less than one acre
- Built: 1820
- Architectural style: Italianate, Romanesque, Federal
- NRHP reference No.: 73001331
- Added to NRHP: August 14, 1973

Liberty Row is a national historic district located at Fayetteville, Cumberland County, North Carolina. It encompasses 14 contributing buildings and 1 contributing site in the central business district of Fayetteville. The district includes consists of a block of 14 brick row buildings dating between 1791 and 1916. The Liberty Point Store is the oldest structure and is a two-story, five-bay, Federal-style brick building. The brickwork of the Liberty Point Store and several other original facades are laid in Flemish bond while others are laid in common bond.

It was listed on the National Register of Historic Places in 1973. It is incorporated into the Fayetteville Downtown Historic District.
