= John A. Oates House =

Historic house in North Carolina, United States

- U.S. National Register of Historic Places
- Location within North Carolina Location within the United States
- Location: 406 St. James Sq., Fayetteville, North Carolina
- Coordinates: 35°3′26″N 78°52′35″W
- Area: less than one acre
- Built: 1909
- Architectural style: Classical Revival
- MPS: Fayetteville MRA
- NRHP reference No.: 83001866
- Added to NRHP: July 7, 1983

John A. Oates House is a historic home originally located at Fayetteville, Cumberland County, North Carolina. It is a late-18th / early 19th century dwelling remodeled in 1909. It is a two-story, five-bay frame Classical Revival style frame dwelling. It features a two-story pedimented portico supported by four fluted columns.

It was listed on the National Register of Historic Places in 1983.

The Oates House has since been relocated to a Vass, NC country club where it has been repurposed as a private clubhouse.
