= Market House (Fayetteville, North Carolina) =

Historic building in North Carolina, US

- U.S. National Register of Historic Places
- U.S. National Historic Landmark
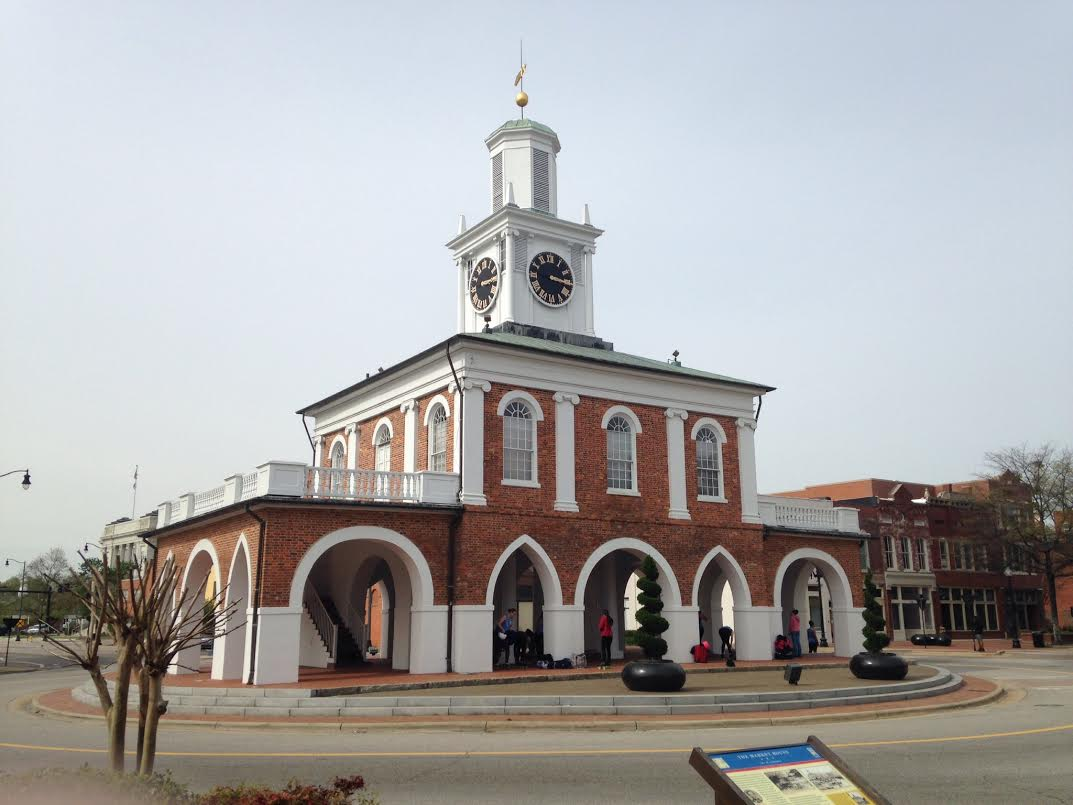

- Location within North Carolina Location within the United States
- Location: Market Sq., Fayetteville, North Carolina
- Coordinates: 35°3′9.2″N 78°52′41.9″W
- Area: less than one acre
- Built: 1832
- NRHP reference No.: 70000451

Significant dates
- Added to NRHP: September 15, 1970
- Designated NHL: November 7, 1973

The Market House is a market house and town hall in the center of Fayetteville, Cumberland County, North Carolina. It was built in 1832 on the site of the old state house and Town Hall which burned down in 1831. Fayetteville was the capital of North Carolina from 1789 to 1794.

It has an arcaded open ground level, and a meeting hall above in a standard market house format which originated in the British Isles and is also common in New England. It served both as a town hall and general market until the early 20th century, and was declared a National Historic Landmark in 1973. The upper floor now houses a museum.

A study completed by Duke University professor John Cavanagh noted that "sales [near this location] were spaced on the average about two months apart, if that frequently, and in most instances very few slaves were involved in each transaction". Because of its history as a general trading and market place, it is assumed that slaves were also traded there. It was also widely used as a market for goods and livestock which sometimes included human chattel.

== Description and history ==
The Market House is located in the rotary at the center of the junction of Green, Person, Gillespie, and Hay Streets, in downtown Fayetteville. It is a two-story brick building, with an open arcaded 5-bay ground floor and a large meeting space on the second floor. It has a hip roof, above which rises a tower that houses a belfry and clock, and is topped by a cupola with weathervane. The arches that form the arcade are symmetrical arrangements of round and lancet-pointed arches, framed in stone. Portions of the arcade extend beyond the second floor block, creating single-story sections that are topped by balustrades.

The Market House was built in 1832, on the site of the building that had housed the state legislature 1788–1793; it was one of many buildings destroyed by a devastating 1831 fire. The ground floor was used as a market space until 1907, and the upper level as town hall until 1906. Faced with the prospect of demolition, a private organization was formed to take over maintenance of the property. The Market House Museum is located on the second floor and features 'rotating monthly, special-emphasis Market House exhibits'.

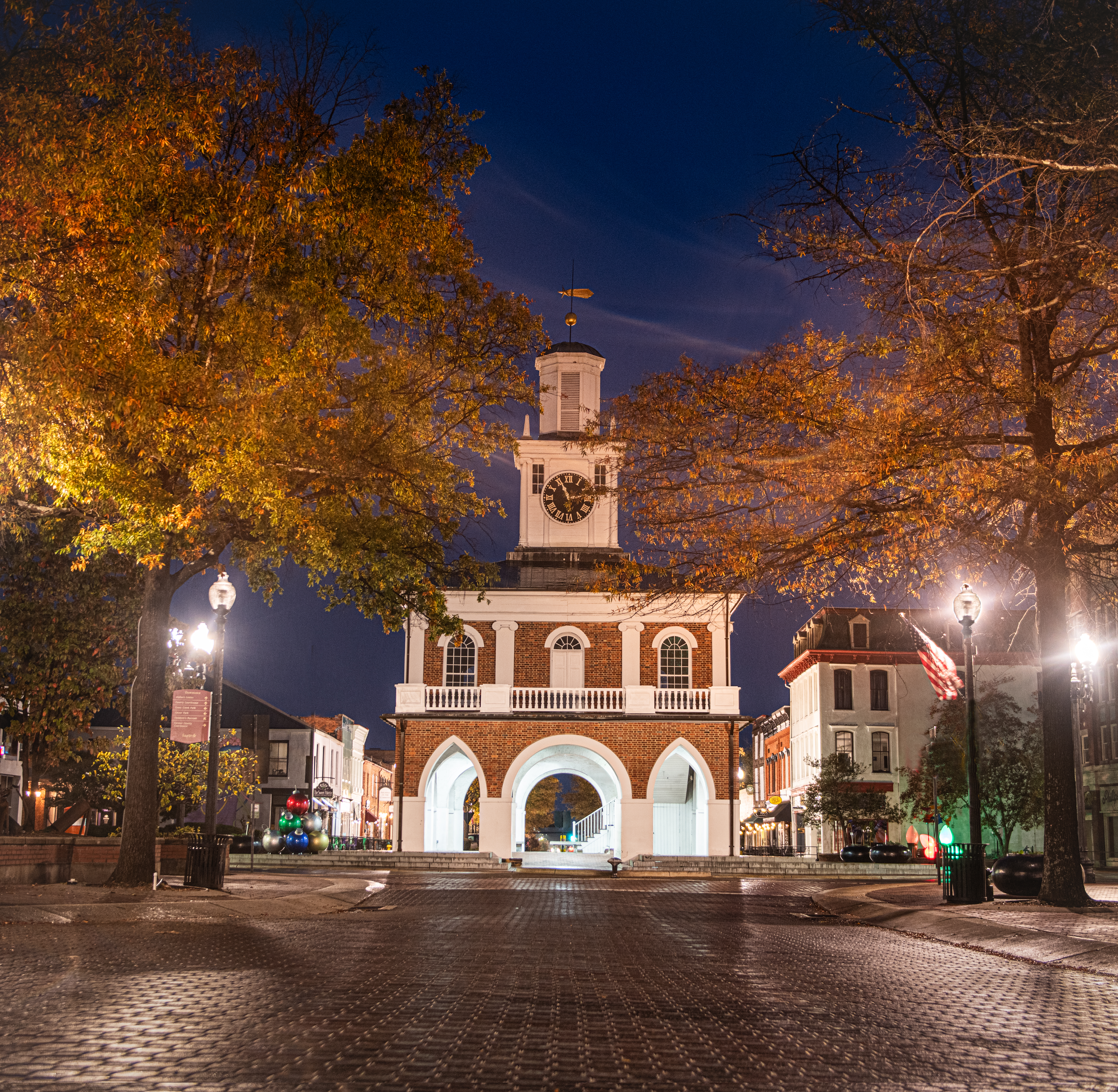
Market House Square District, Fayetteville NC

The building is an example of a more European market house form, and its design is similar to those found in South Shields, Stockton-on-Tees and Abingdon-on-Thames in England and bears a striking resemblance to the market house constructed in 1790 in Hillsborough, County Down, Northern Ireland. Buildings with the same market house function include Faneuil Hall in Boston, Massachusetts, which originally had an arcaded ground floor until its 1806 expansion, and the City Market in Charleston, South Carolina, which retains its arcaded ground floor. Both of these buildings are also National Historic Landmarks.

During the George Floyd protests, on May 30, 2020, protestors attempted to set the building ablaze; the fire was quickly extinguished, resulting in only minor damage.

== See also ==
- List of National Historic Landmarks in North Carolina
- National Register of Historic Places listings in Cumberland County, North Carolina
- List of Irish towns with a Market House
- Market hall
