= Confederate Breastworks =

- U.S. National Register of Historic Places
- U.S. Historic district – Contributing property
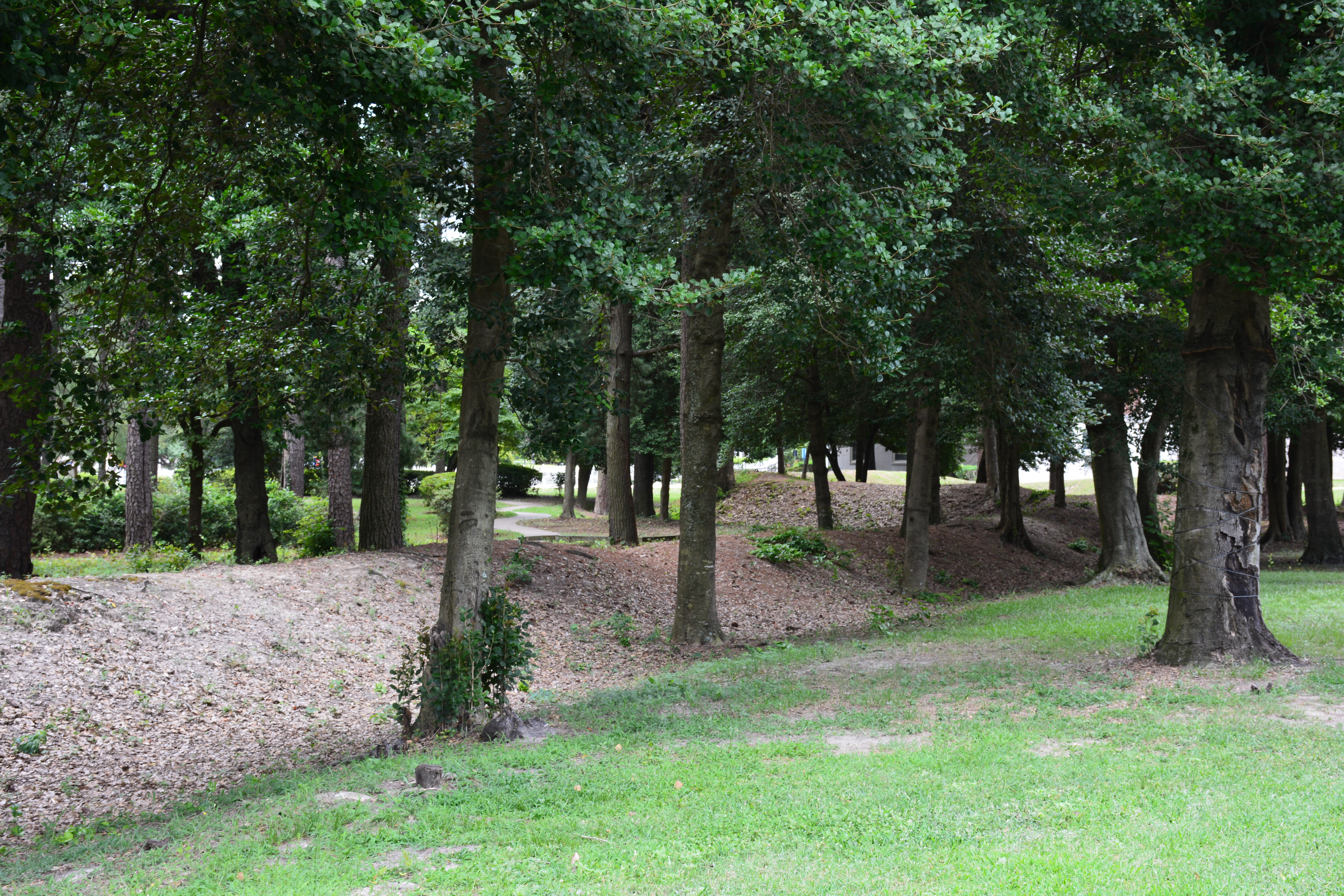

- Location within North Carolina Location within the United States
- Location: 2300 Ramsey St., Fayetteville, North Carolina
- Coordinates: 35°5′19″N 78°15′34″W
- Area: 2 acres (0.81 ha)
- Built: 1865
- NRHP reference No.: 81000421
- Added to NRHP: October 7, 1981

Confederate Breastworks is a historic breastworks located at Fayetteville, Cumberland County, North Carolina. The earthen bunkers are located on the grounds of the Fayetteville Veterans Administration Hospital behind the main building. They were built in March 1865 as part of the fortification of Fayetteville by the Confederate army to protect the city against the oncoming forces led by General William Tecumseh Sherman.

It was listed on the National Register of Historic Places in 1985. It is located in the Fayetteville Veterans Administration Hospital Historic District.
