= Taylor-Utley House =

Historic house in North Carolina, United States

- U.S. National Register of Historic Places
- Location within North Carolina Location within the United States
- Location: 916 Hay St., Fayetteville, North Carolina
- Coordinates: 35°3′23″N 78°53′46″W
- Area: less than one acre
- Built: c. 1848
- Architectural style: Greek Revival
- MPS: Fayetteville MRA
- NRHP reference No.: 83001872
- Added to NRHP: July 7, 1983

Taylor-Utley House is a historic home located at Fayetteville, Cumberland County, North Carolina. It was built about 1848, and is a 2 1/2-story, three-bay, gable roofed frame dwelling in a vernacular Greek Revival style. It has a two-story wing added in 1932.

It was listed on the National Register of Historic Places in 1983.
