= Fayetteville Veterans Administration Hospital Historic District =

Historic district in North Carolina, United States

- U.S. National Register of Historic Places
- U.S. Historic district
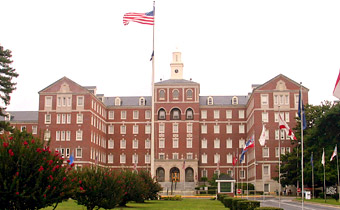
- Fayetteville VA Medical Center Main Building

- Location within North Carolina Location within the United States
- Location: 2300 Ramsey St., Fayetteville, North Carolina
- Coordinates: 35°5′19″N 78°52′34″W
- Area: less than one acre
- Built: 1939
- Architectural style: Colonial Revival
- NRHP reference No.: 12000799
- Added to NRHP: September 19, 2012

Fayetteville Veterans Administration Hospital Historic District is a national historic district located at Fayetteville, Cumberland County, North Carolina. It encompasses 8 contributing buildings, 1 contributing site, 1 contributing structure, and 1 contributing object on the medical center campus. They include the main building/outpatient clinic (1939), service building (1939), manager's quarters (1939), attendants’ quarters (1939), laundry building (1939), the flag pole (1939), and the attendants’ quarters (1939). Also located in the district is the separately listed Confederate Breastworks.

It was listed on the National Register of Historic Places in 2012.
