= Belden-Horne House =

Historic house in North Carolina, United States

- U.S. National Register of Historic Places
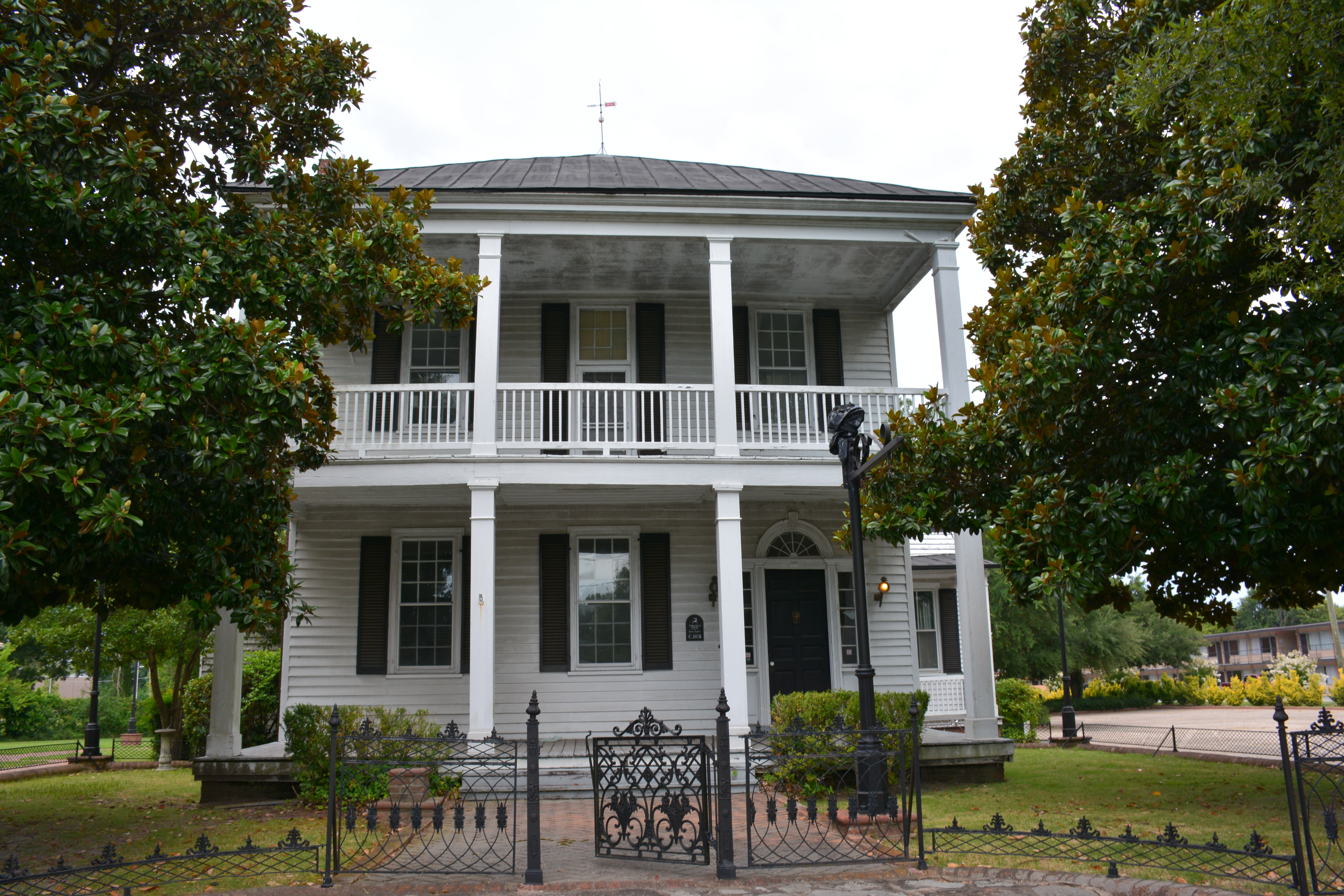

- Location within North Carolina Location within the United States
- Location: 519 Ramsey St., Fayetteville, North Carolina
- Coordinates: 35°3′39″N 78°52′42″W
- Area: 1 acre (0.40 ha)
- Built: 1831
- Architectural style: Late Federal
- NRHP reference No.: 72000955
- Added to NRHP: March 16, 1972

Belden-Horne House is a historic home located at Fayetteville, Cumberland County, North Carolina. It was built in 1831, and is a 2 1/2-story, three bay by four bay, side-hall plan Late Federal style frame dwelling. It features a two-tier porch with a hip roof and Palladian entrance. Barge's Tavern was moved to the Belden-Horne House property in 1978.

It was listed on the National Register of Historic Places in 1972.
