= Mansard Roof House =

Historic house in North Carolina, United States

- U.S. National Register of Historic Places
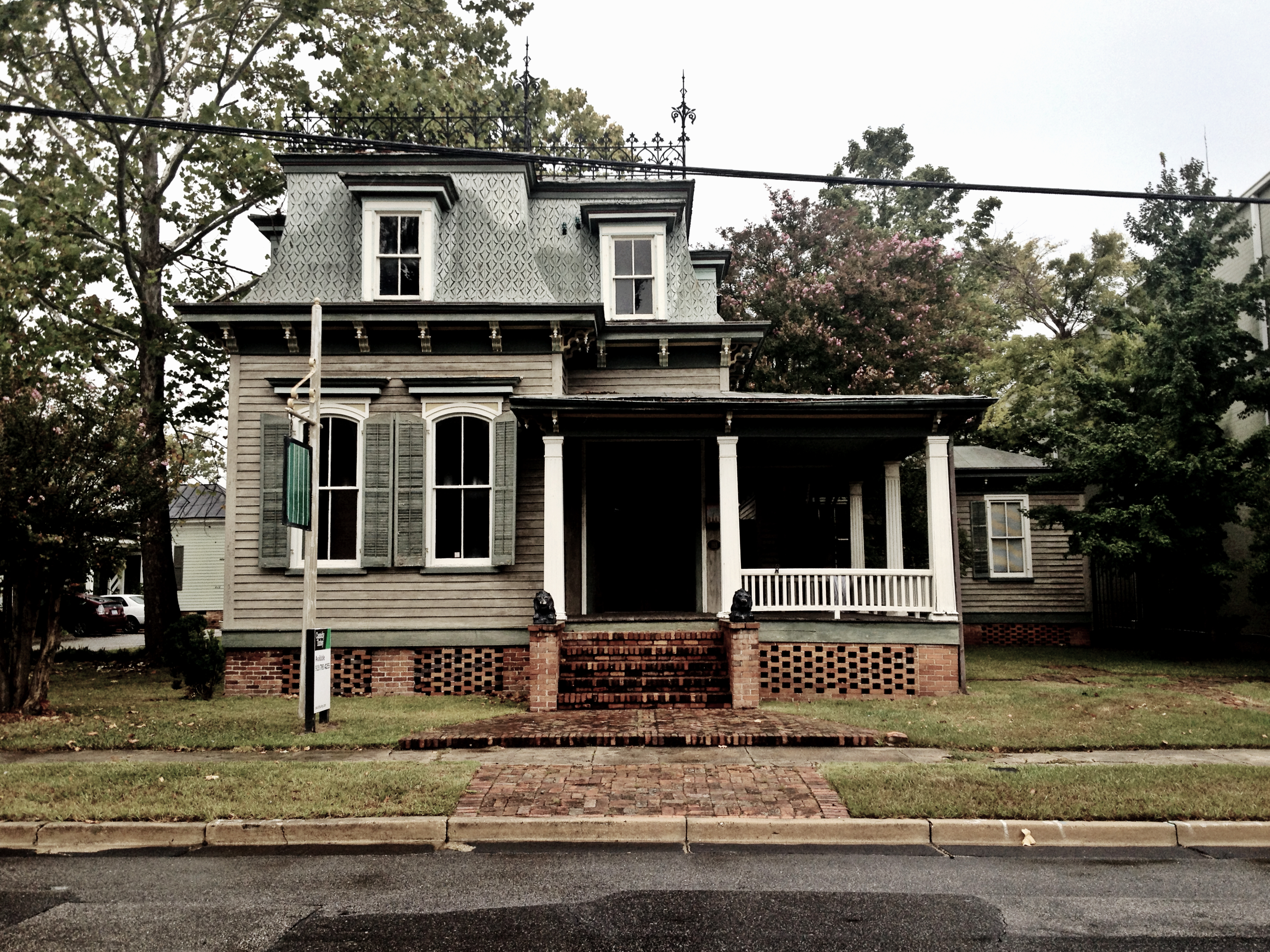
- Mansard Roof House, September 2013

- Location within North Carolina Location within the United States
- Location: 214 Mason St., Fayetteville, North Carolina
- Coordinates: 35°3′21″N 78°52′45″W
- Area: 0.3 acres (0.12 ha)
- Built: 1883
- Architectural style: Second Empire
- NRHP reference No.: 73001332
- Added to NRHP: March 20, 1973

Mansard Roof House is a historic home located at Fayetteville, Cumberland County, North Carolina. It was built in 1883, and is a 1 1/2-story, three bay by six bay, Second Empire style frame dwelling. It has a side-hall plan and rear wing. It features a mansard roof covered with diaper-patterned pressed metal and wraparound porch.

It was listed on the National Register of Historic Places in 1973.
