= Florida Power and Light Company Ice Plant =

- U.S. National Register of Historic Places
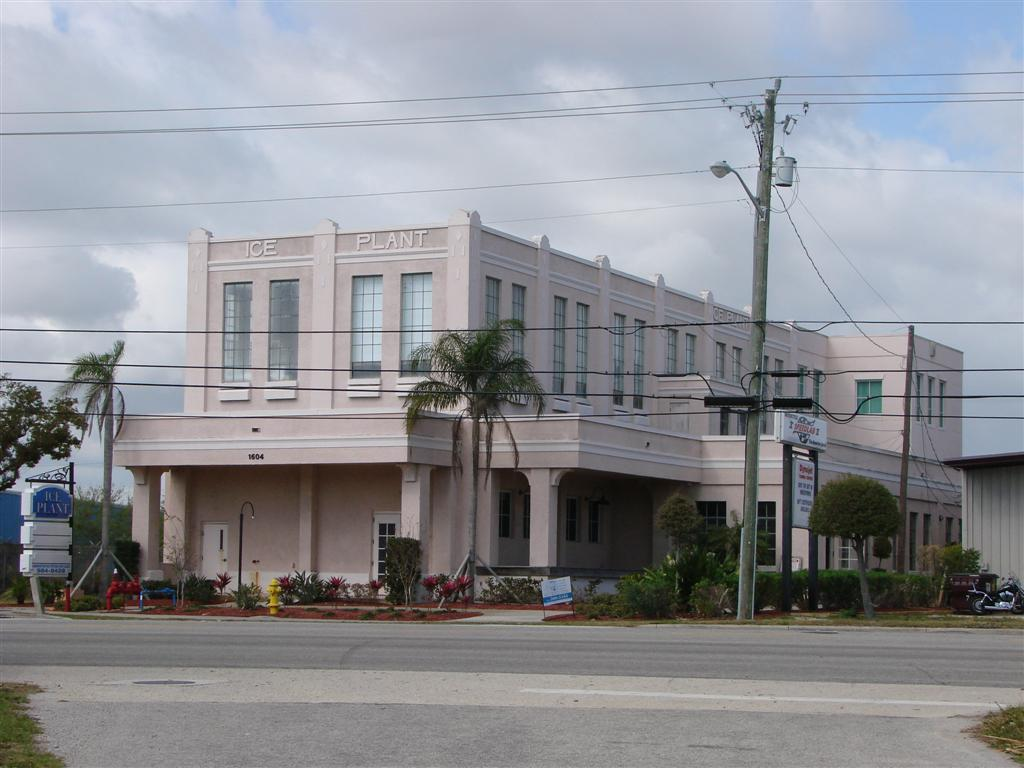

- Location within Florida Location within the United States
- Location: Melbourne, Florida
- Coordinates: 28°04′59″N 80°36′22″W
- NRHP reference No.: 82001033
- Added to NRHP: November 17, 1982

The Florida Power and Light Company Ice Plant (also known as the City Products Corporation Ice Plant or locally as the Ice Plant) is a historic site in Melbourne, Florida, United States, formerly operated by Florida Power & Light. It is located at 1604 South Harbor City Boulevard. On November 17, 1982, it was added to the U.S. National Register of Historic Places.

Construction on the plant began in December 1926 after the approval of a permit; it was completed in the spring of 1927. The original estimated cost was $30,000, but the final construction cost has been listed at $100,000. The plant, which had an ice capacity of 50 tons at its peak, ceased operation in 1977.

At various times, proposals have been made to redevelop the building as a restaurant, offices, or residential space.
