= Cape Fear Baptist Church =

Historic church in North Carolina, United States

- U.S. National Register of Historic Places
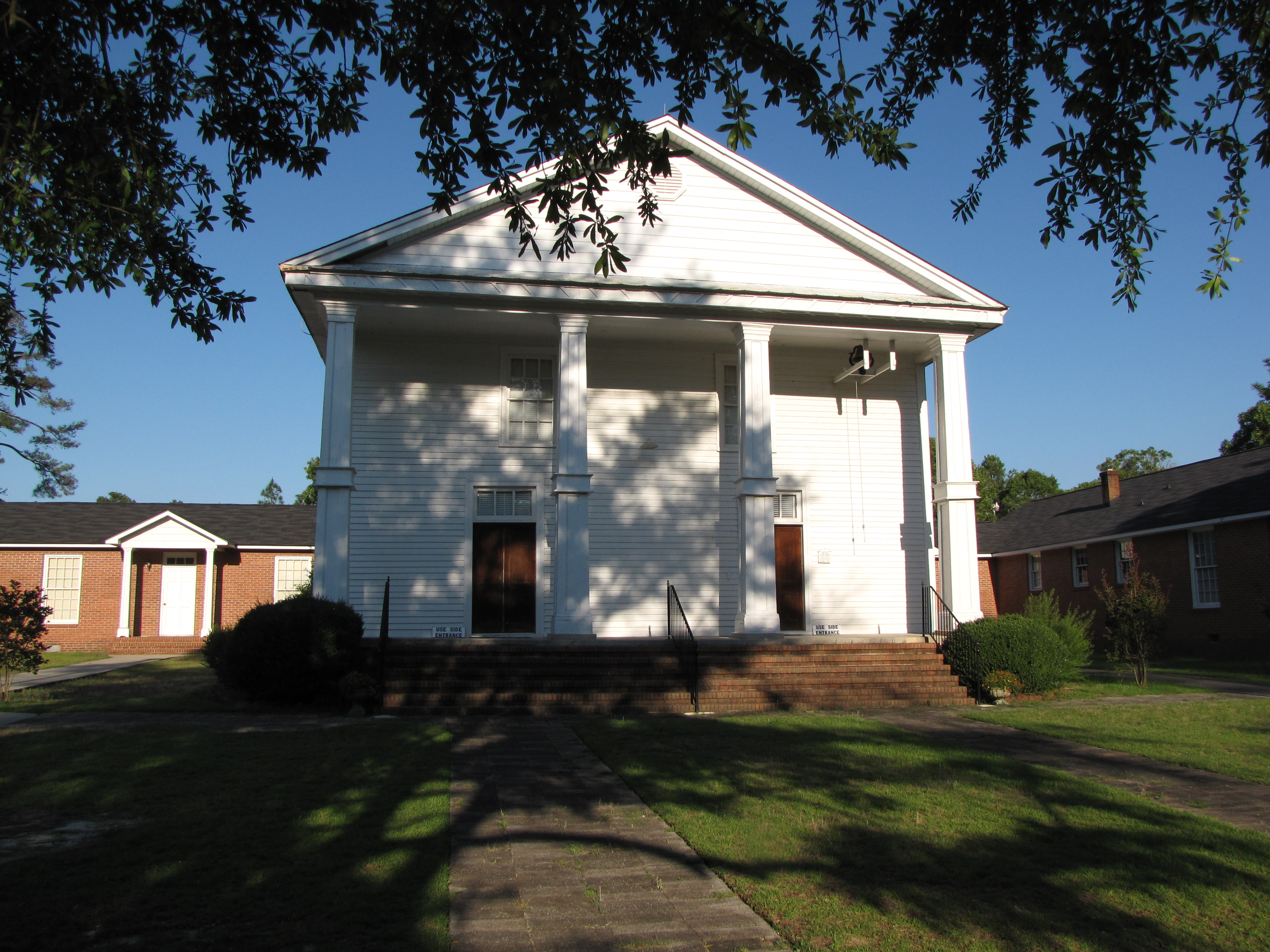
- Cape Fear Baptist Church

- Location within North Carolina Location within the United States
- Location: SR 2233, Hope Mills, North Carolina
- Coordinates: 34°54′21″N 78°49′37″W
- Area: 3.8 acres (1.5 ha)
- Built: 1859
- Architectural style: Greek Revival
- NRHP reference No.: 83003816
- Added to NRHP: October 13, 1983

Cape Fear Baptist Church is a historic Baptist church near Hope Mills in Grays Creek Township, Cumberland County, North Carolina.

Cape Fear Baptist Church is on Butler Nursery Road in rural Cumberland County, North Carolina. The church was established in 1756 as Particular Baptist Church. The current sanctuary was constructed in 1859. It is a two-story frame gable-roof building with a monumental Greek Revival style two-story pedimented front portico.

It was listed on the National Register of Historic Places in 1983.
