= Frank H. Stedman House =

Historic house in North Carolina, United States

- U.S. National Register of Historic Places
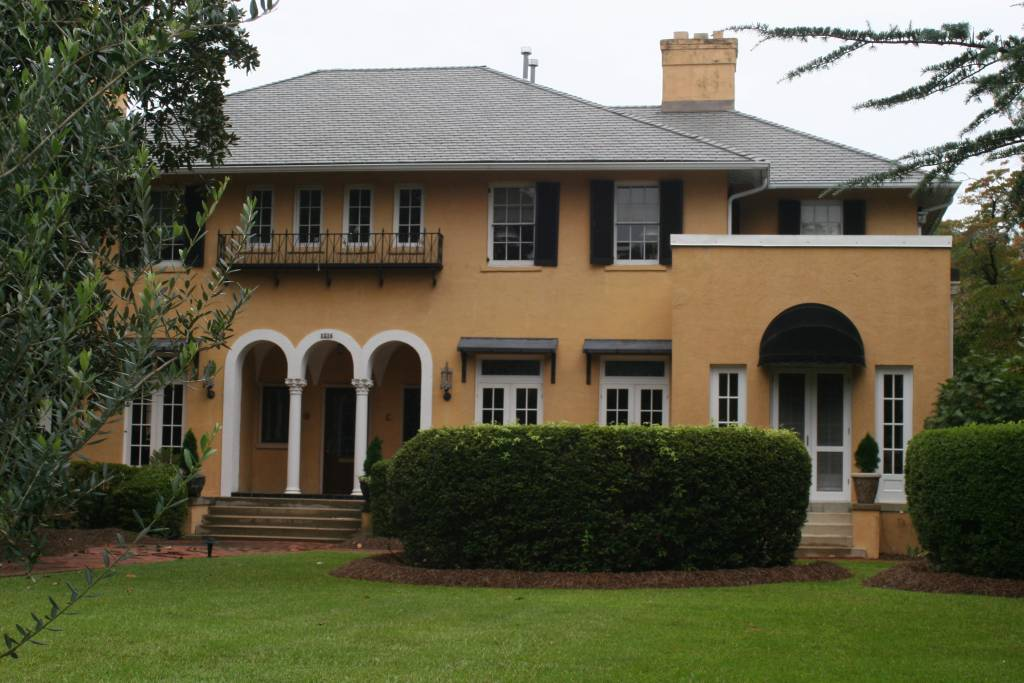
- Stedman House, September 2014

- Location within North Carolina Location within the United States
- Location: 1516 Morganton Rd., Fayetteville, North Carolina
- Coordinates: 35°3′30″N 78°54′18″W
- Area: 1.1 acres (0.45 ha)
- Built: 1925
- Built by: Reinecke and Dixon
- Architect: Dixon, Stiles
- Architectural style: Late 19th And 20th Century Revivals, Italian Villa
- NRHP reference No.: 02000966
- Added to NRHP: September 14, 2002

Frank H. Stedman House is a historic home located at Fayetteville, Cumberland County, North Carolina. It was built in 1925, and consists of a two-story, five-bay, main block with a hip roof and projecting one-story, flat-roofed wings that form a "U"-shape. It is sheathed in stucco and is in the Italian Renaissance style. The front facade features an arcade supported by two Corinthian order columns. Also on the property is a contributing garage apartment.

It was listed on the National Register of Historic Places in 2002.
