= Carvers Creek State Park =

State park in North Carolina, United States

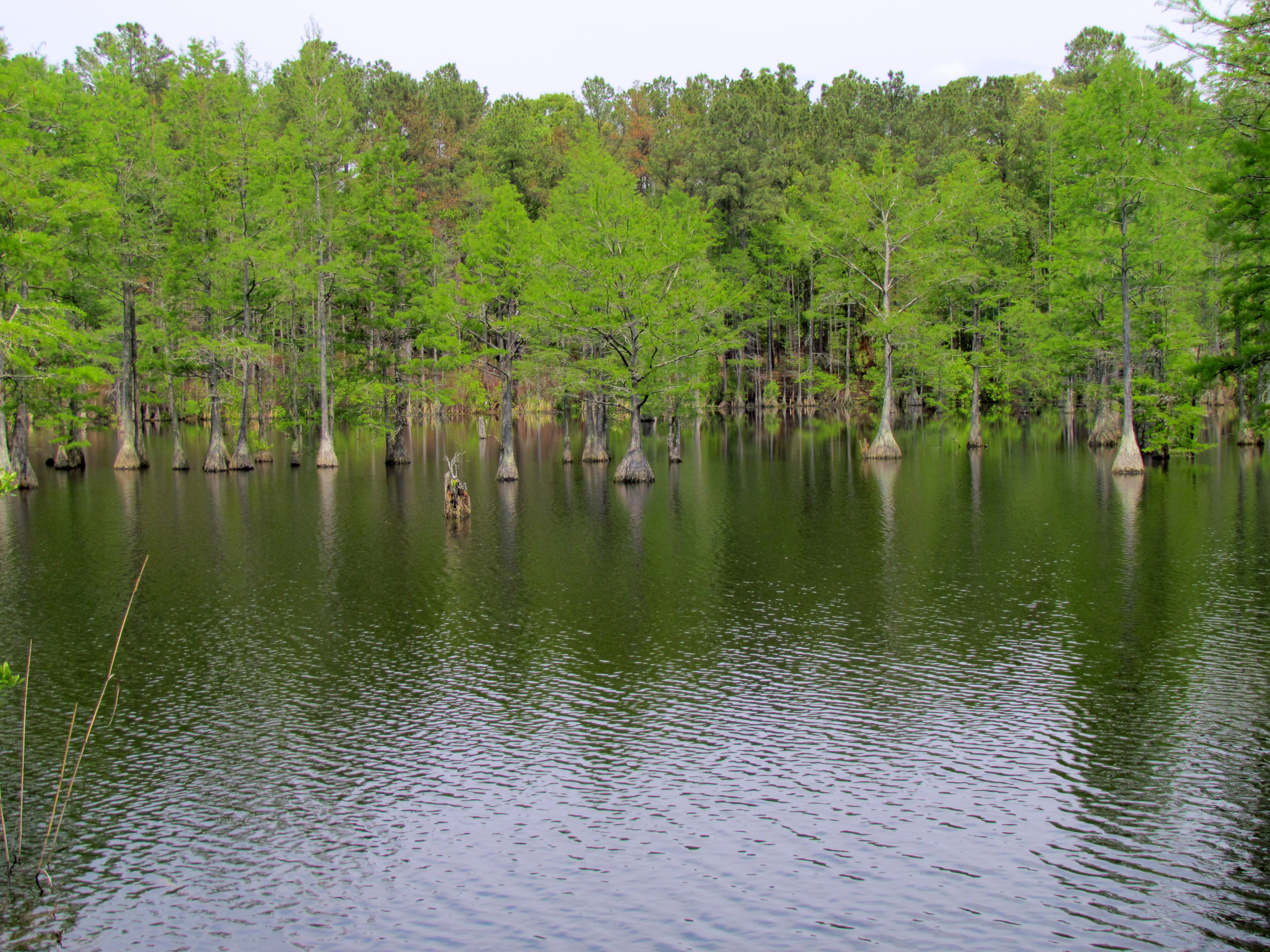

- Location within North Carolina Location within the United States
- Interactive map of Carvers Creek State Park
- Location: Spring Lake, North Carolina, United States
- Coordinates: 35°11′49″N 78°58′36″W
- Area: 4,530 acres (1,830 ha)
- Established: 2005
- Administrator: North Carolina Division of Parks and Recreation
- Website: Official website

Carvers Creek State Park is a North Carolina state park in Cumberland County, North Carolina in the United States. Located north of Fayetteville, it covers 4,530 acres (1,830 ha) in the Sandhills region of the state. The park covers lands around Carvers Creek, a tributary of the Cape Fear River, and it borders Fort Bragg. The park is divided into two areas, Long Valley Farm and the Sandhills Property.

On September 9, 2013, interim park facilities were opened to the public at the Long Valley Farm Access. Facilities include a ranger contact station, picnic area, lake fishing access, and hiking trails.

== Trails ==
The 2-mile (3.2 km) James S. Rockefeller Loop Trail is park's main trail; it provides access to the Rockefeller House from the park's office and picnic area, before looping back around and ending near the entrance to the parking lot.

The 0.75-mile (1.21 km) Cypress Point Loop Trail begins near the Rockefeller house, and it loops around the southern shore of the millpond.

== The Rockefeller House and Mill Pond ==
The Rockefeller House is situated on the edge of a 100-acre mill pond. The house is the former winter estate of James Stillman Rockefeller, great-nephew to John D. Rockefeller of Standard Oil. The house is 6,000 sq. feet, with two stories of living space, an attic, and a basement. Most of the house has its original wood flooring, and much of the house has wood to ceiling plank walls. The exception is the kitchen and servants area, which were remodeled in the 70s. The house and other structures were added to the National Register of Historic Places in the early 1990s. The house interior is normally closed to the public, with one or two guided tours being offered a month.

The mill pond outside the house dates back to the 1800s when the property was used for lumber cutting and processing. Its held back by an old earth works dam on its south-east edge. Three water gates are located beneath the pavilion, which was formerly the logging deck for the pond. At the other end of the dam is a modern gate used to power a gristmill. At the far end of the cypress loop trail is an observation deck that allows fishing. Canoeing is also available on the pond.

=== Restoration of the Mill Pond ===
On September 29, 2016, flood waters rushing down the creek burst the dam, emptying the millpond of most its water and returning it to a creek. The damage was compounded weeks later by the flood waters of Hurricane Mathew. Due to the loss of the pond, fishing and canoeing were no longer available at Carvers Creek. Access to the observation deck, the pavilion, the gristmill, and the dam were restricted as well for safety reasons. The state had plans to replace the dam; initial projections put the completion time at between two and five years from commencement. As of September 18, 2020, the lower gate of the restored dam was closed to allow the millpond to refill. The pond is being stocked with native fish to help restore populations. Fishing, with valid NC state fishing license, and guided canoe trips are once again available. The observation deck burned down in a wildfire in March 2019, but possible plans to restore it are in the works. Access to the pavilion, the gristmill, and the dam remain restricted for safety reasons.

== See also ==
- Long Valley Farm
