= Fayetteville Mutual Insurance Company Building =

- U.S. National Register of Historic Places
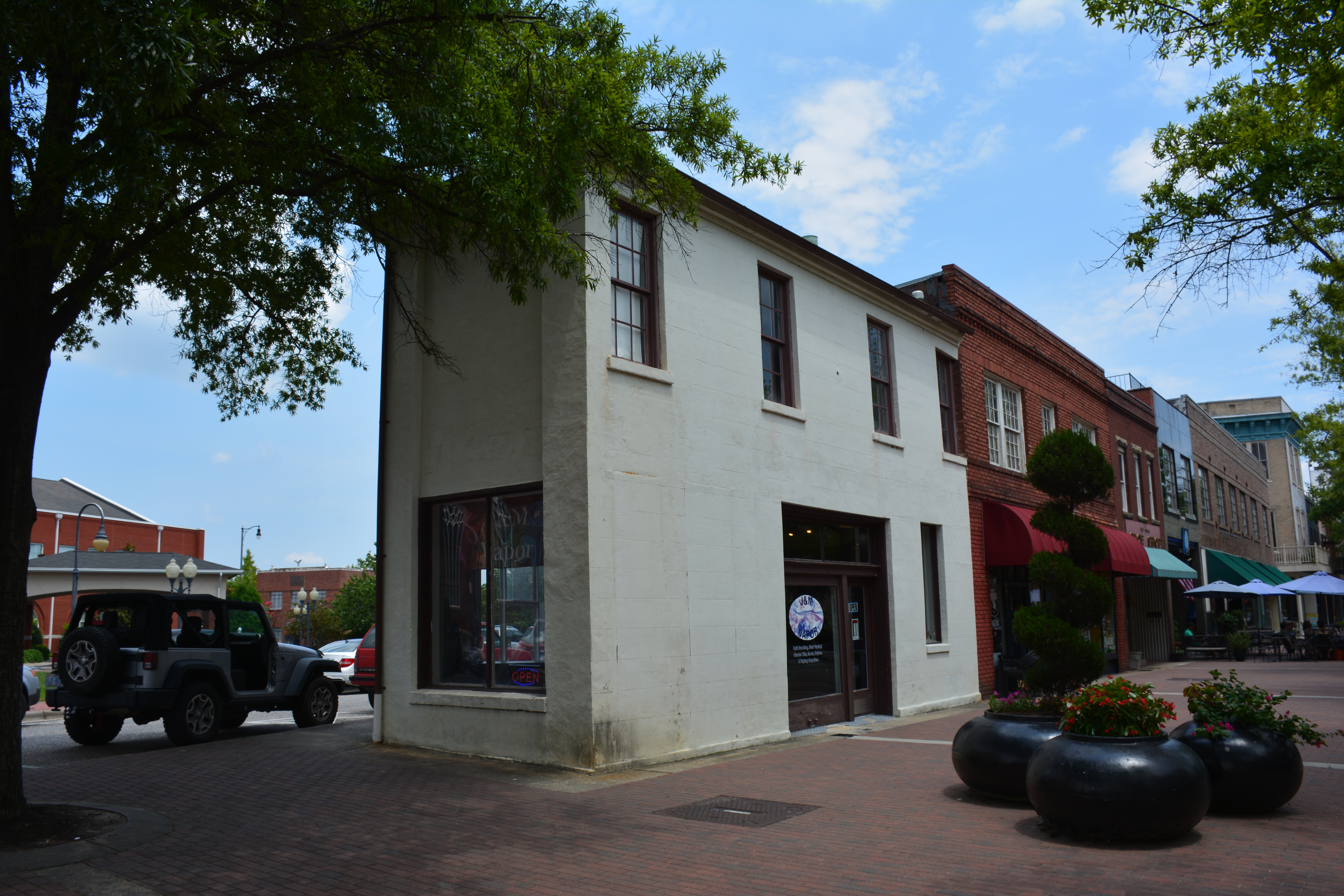

- Location within North Carolina Location within the United States
- Location: 320 Hay St., Fayetteville, North Carolina
- Coordinates: 35°3′14″N 78°52′54″W
- Area: less than one acre
- Built: 1853
- Architectural style: Greek Revival
- MPS: Fayetteville MRA
- NRHP reference No.: 83001852
- Added to NRHP: July 7, 1983

Fayetteville Mutual Insurance Company Building, also known as the Point News building, is a historic commercial building located at Fayetteville, Cumberland County, North Carolina. It was built about 1853, and is a two-story trapezoidal-shaped Greek Revival-style brick building.

It was listed on the National Register of Historic Places in 1983.
