= Barge's Tavern =

- U.S. National Register of Historic Places
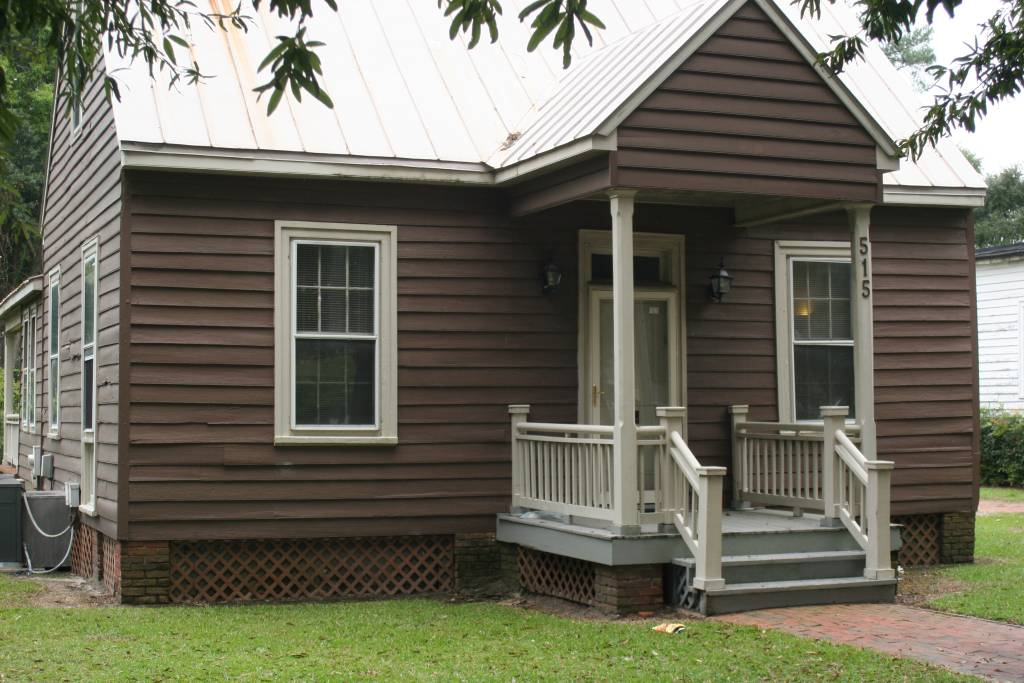
- Barge's Tavern, September 2014

- Location within North Carolina Location within the United States
- Location: 519 Ramsey St., Fayetteville, North Carolina
- Coordinates: 35°3′39″N 78°52′42″W
- Area: 1.6 acres (0.65 ha)
- Built: c. 1800
- MPS: Fayetteville MRA
- NRHP reference No.: 83001843
- Added to NRHP: July 7, 1983

Barge's Tavern is a historic tavern building located at Fayetteville, Cumberland County, North Carolina. It was built about 1800, and is a 1 1/2-story, three-bay, frame building with a gable roof and central chimney. A gable roofed porch and rear ell were added in the late-19th century. It was moved to its present site behind the Belden-Horne House in 1978.

It was listed on the National Register of Historic Places in 1983.
