= Brownlea =

Historic house in North Carolina, United States

- U.S. National Register of Historic Places
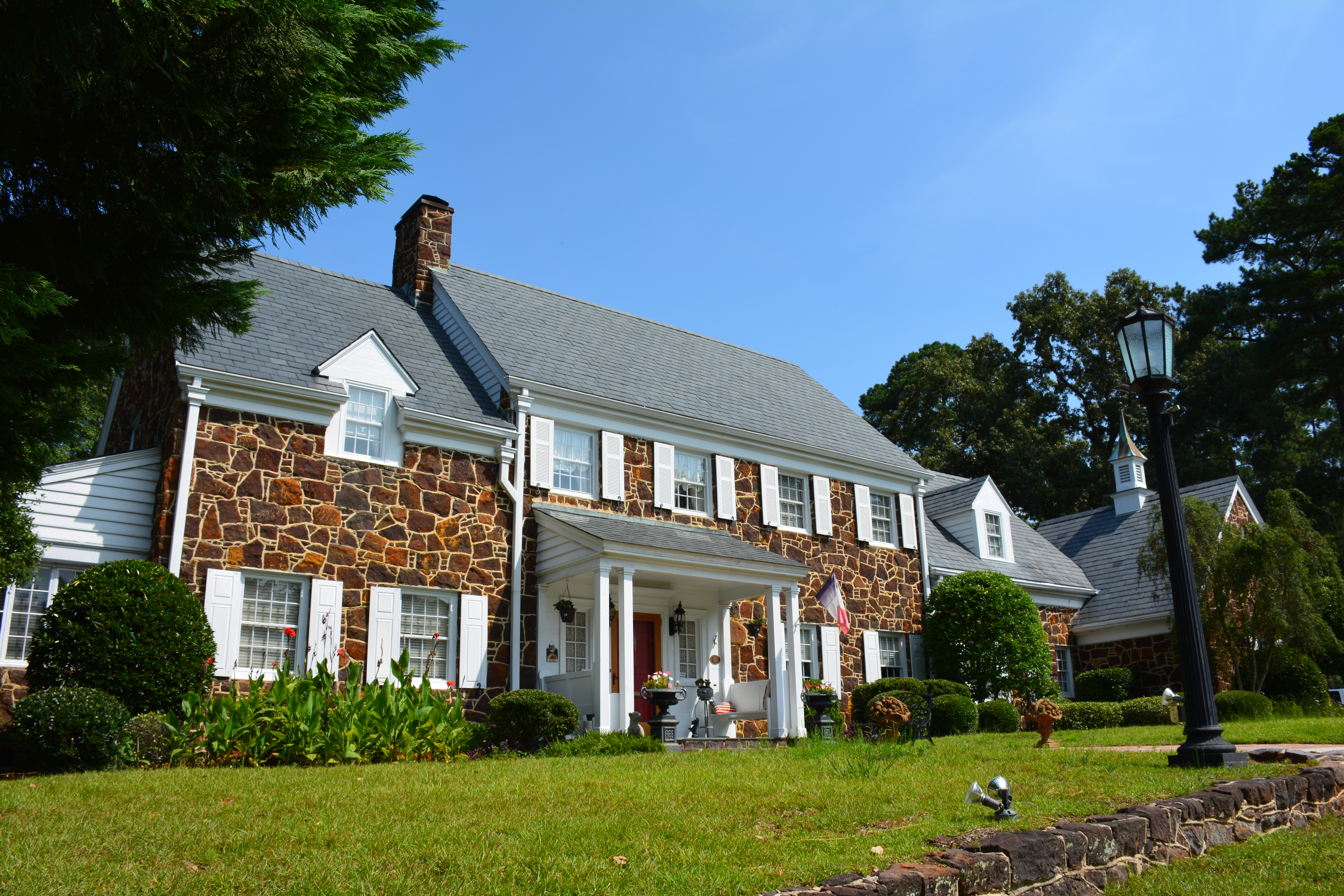

- Location within North Carolina Location within the United States
- Location: 405 Southampton Court, Fayetteville, North Carolina
- Coordinates: 35°3′8″N 78°54′53″W
- Area: 2.9 acres (1.2 ha)
- Built: 1939
- Architect: McDowell, J. Harold
- Architectural style: Colonial Revival
- NRHP reference No.: 03000803
- Added to NRHP: August 21, 2003

Brownlea, also known as the Rufus C. Brown House, is a historic home located at Fayetteville, Cumberland County, North Carolina. It was built in 1939, and is a five-part Colonial Revival style stone dwelling. It consists of a two-story main block, flanked by 1 1/2-story wings, with garage and sunroom appendages. Also on the property are a contributing well house and barbeque pit, both built in 1939.

It was listed on the National Register of Historic Places in 2003.
