= McArthur-Council House =

Historic house in North Carolina, United States

- U.S. National Register of Historic Places
- Location within North Carolina Location within the United States
- Location: SR 2244, near Grays Creek, North Carolina
- Coordinates: 34°53′38″N 78°55′58″W
- Area: 3.1 acres (1.3 ha)
- Built: c. 1835, 1918-1920
- Architectural style: Late Victorian
- NRHP reference No.: 83001861
- Added to NRHP: July 21, 1983

McArthur-Council House is a historic home located near Grays Creek, Cumberland County, North Carolina. The earliest two room section was built about 1835, and was enlarged and modified between 1918 and 1920. It is a two-story, Late Victorian style frame dwelling with a gable roof. It features a double-tiered front porch.

It was listed on the National Register of Historic Places in 1983.
