= Waddill's Store =

Historic building in North Carolina

- U.S. National Register of Historic Places
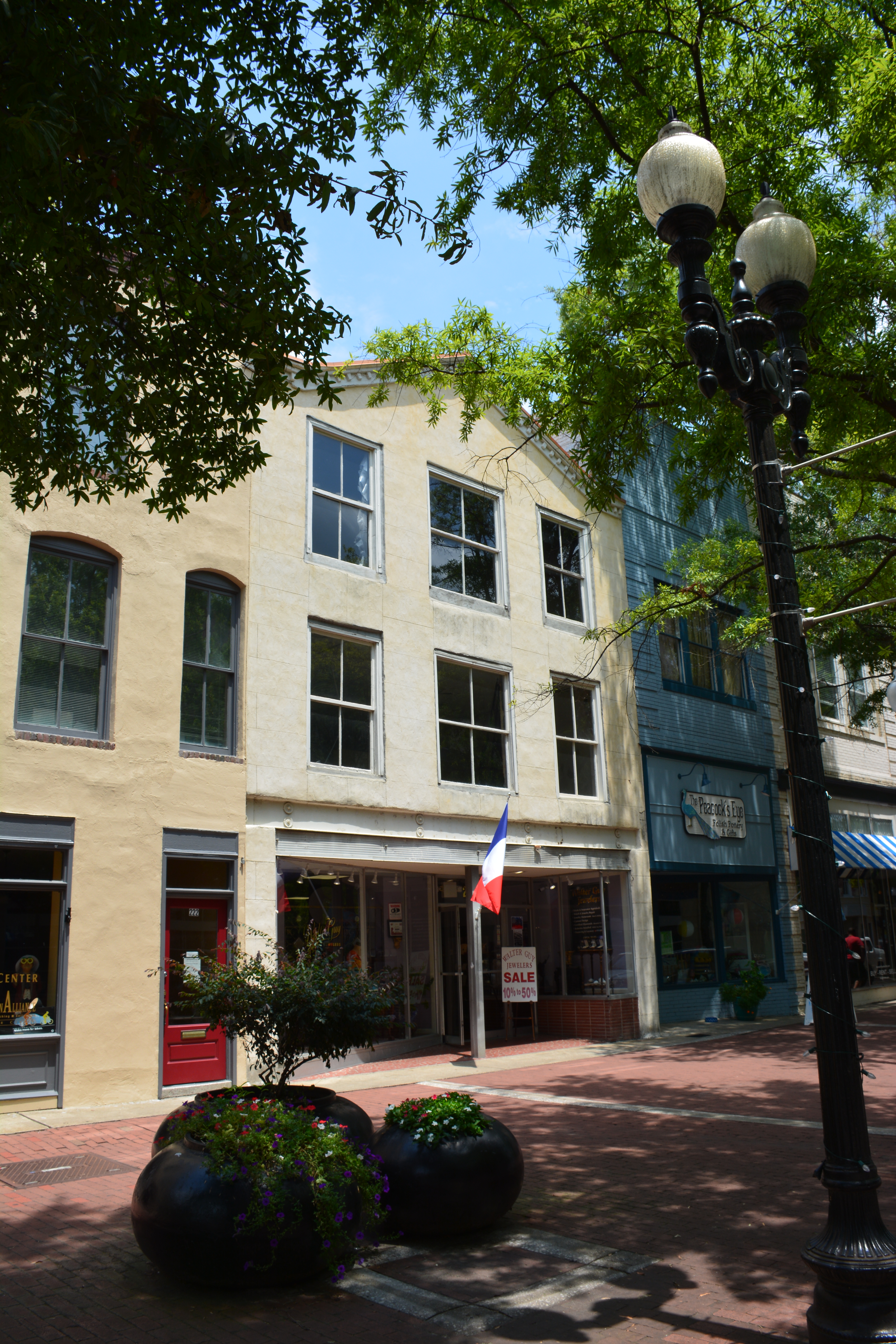

- Location within North Carolina Location within the United States
- Location: 220 Hay St., Fayetteville, North Carolina
- Coordinates: 35°3′12″N 78°52′49″W
- Area: less than one acre
- Built: c. 1850
- Architectural style: Greek Revival
- MPS: Fayetteville MRA
- NRHP reference No.: 83001874
- Added to NRHP: July 7, 1983

Waddill's Store, also known as Bernard's Men's Shop, is a historic commercial building located at Fayetteville, Cumberland County, North Carolina. It was built about 1850, and is a three-story, three-bay, Greek Revival-style brick building. It has a gable front and once had a three-tiered front porch. It originally housed a general merchandise store.

It was listed on the National Register of Historic Places in 1983.
