= Long Valley Farm =

Historic farm in North Carolina, United States

- U.S. National Register of Historic Places
- U.S. Historic district
- Location within North Carolina Location within the United States
- Nearest city: Spring Lake, North Carolina
- Coordinates: 35°12′40″N 78°58′39″W
- Area: 1,400 acres (570 ha)
- Built: 1937
- Built by: McNeill, George
- Architect: Husted, Ellery
- Architectural style: Colonial Revival, Bungalow/craftsman, Side-gable frame bldg
- Part of: Carvers Creek State Park
- NRHP reference No.: 94000032
- Added to NRHP: June 6, 1994

Long Valley Farm is a historic farm and national historic district located in Carvers Creek State Park near Spring Lake in Cumberland County and Harnett County, North Carolina. It encompasses 24 contributing buildings and 5 contributing structures on a winter agricultural estate. The main house is known as the Long Valley Farm Seat, or James Stillman Rockefeller Residence, and was built in 1937–1938. It is a two-story, five-bay, Colonial Revival style frame dwelling with one-story wings. Other notable contributing resources are the Mill Pavilion, Mill House and Gates, Pack House, Forge, Great Barn, Overseer's House, Tobacco Barns, Worker's Houses, Springhouse, and Water Tower. Noted financier James Stillman Rockefeller become the full owner of Long Valley Farm in January 1937.

It was listed on the National Register of Historic Places in 1994.

== See also ==
- Carvers Creek State Park
