= John E. Patterson House =

Historic house in North Carolina, United States

- U.S. National Register of Historic Places
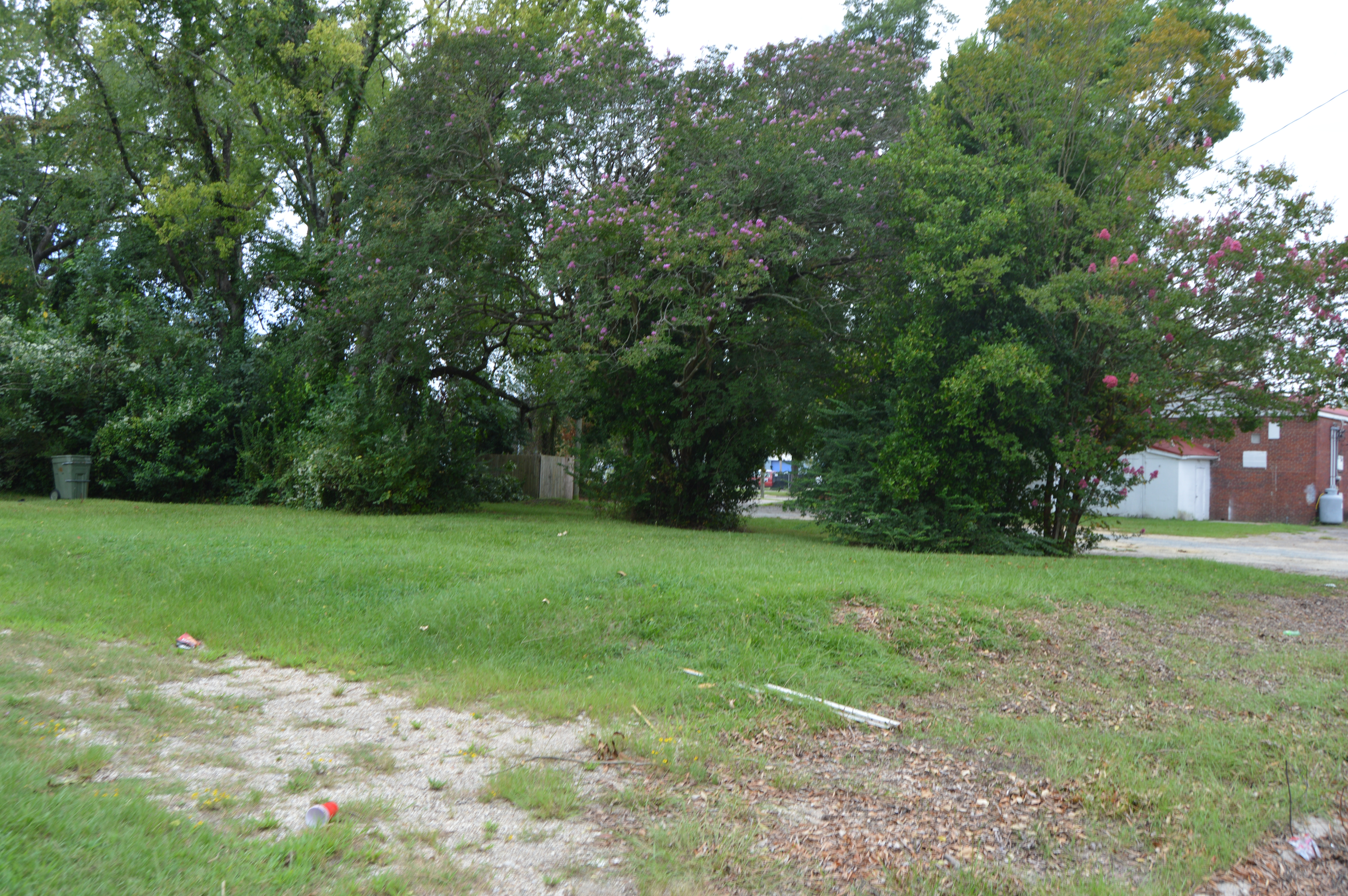
- Site of the house, now an empty lot

- Location within North Carolina Location within the United States
- Location: 445 Moore St., Fayetteville, North Carolina
- Coordinates: 35°3′41″N 78°53′2″W
- Area: less than one acre
- Built: c. 1840
- Architectural style: Greek Revival, Coastal cottage
- MPS: Fayetteville MRA
- NRHP reference No.: 83001867
- Added to NRHP: July 7, 1983

John E. Patterson House, also known as Cashwell House, is a historic home located at Fayetteville, Cumberland County, North Carolina. It was built about 1840, and is a 1 1/2-story, five-bay frame coastal cottage form frame dwelling. It features a full-width, engaged front porch and Greek Revival style design elements. It was the home of a free black brick mason and real estate speculator John E. Patterson.

It was listed on the National Register of Historic Places in 1983.
