= Gully Mill =

- U.S. National Register of Historic Places
- Location within North Carolina Location within the United States
- Location: S.R. 1839, near Fayetteville, North Carolina
- Coordinates: 35°3′22″N 78°50′29″W
- Area: 2.5 acres (1.0 ha)
- Built: 1900
- MPS: Fayetteville MRA
- NRHP reference No.: 83001854
- Added to NRHP: July 7, 1983

Gully Mill is a historic grist mill located on the Cape Fear River near Fayetteville, Cumberland County, North Carolina. The mill was built about 1900, and consists of one and two story sections, a large water wheel operated by water flowing through a partially underground flume, and an open rear shed. Also on the property are a miller's house, corrugated metal storage silos, a chicken coop, and miscellaneous related structures.

It was listed on the National Register of Historic Places in 1983.
