= Cross Creek Cemetery =

Historic cemetery in Cumberland County, North Carolina, US

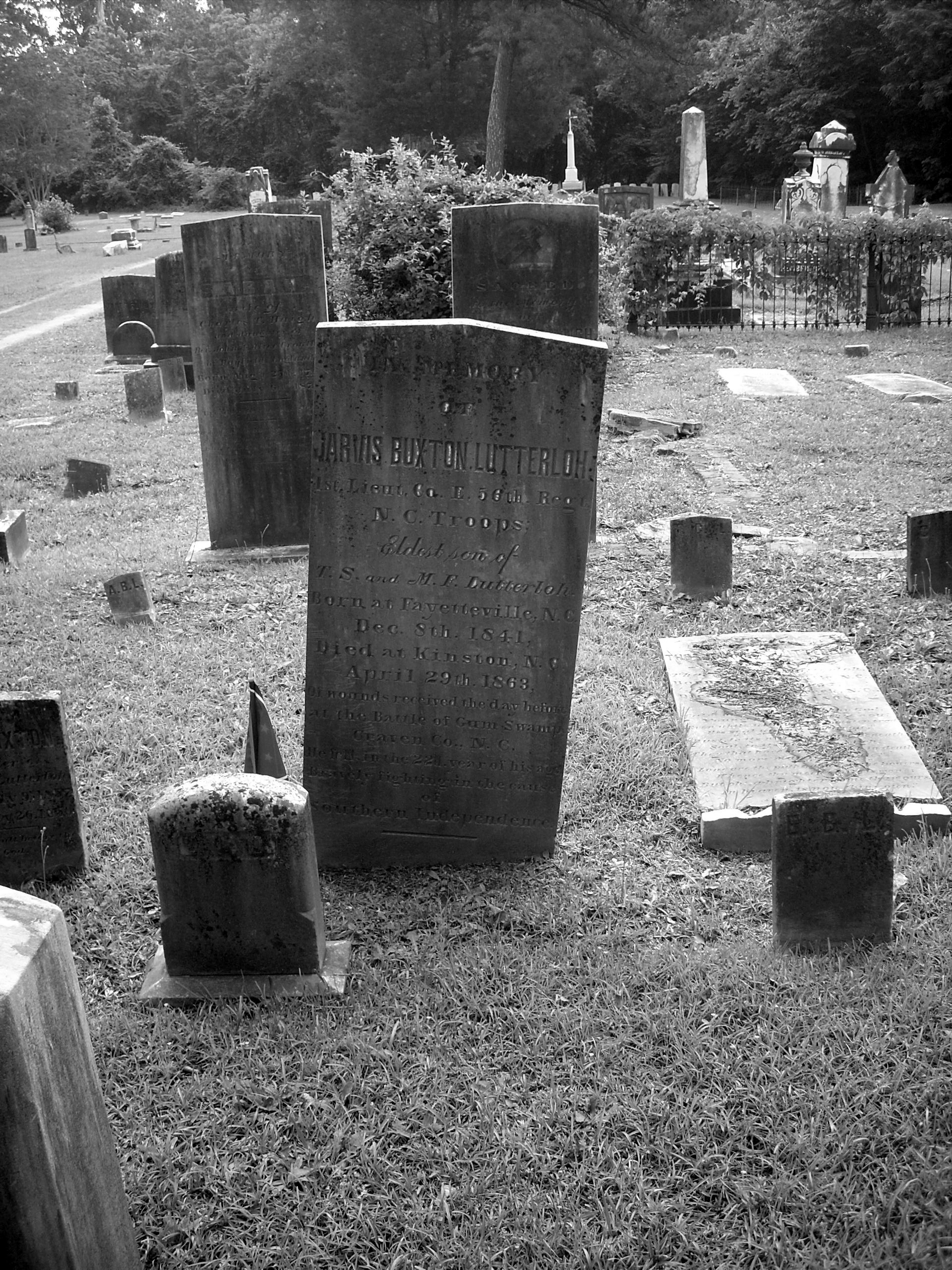
- Interactive map of Cross Creek Cemetery

Details
- Established: 1785
- Location: Fayetteville, North Carolina
- Country: United States
- Coordinates: 35°03′31″N 78°52′18″W
- Type: Public
- Find a Grave: , , , ,
- The Political Graveyard: Cross Creek Cemetery
- Cross Creek Cemetery Number One
- U.S. National Register of Historic Places
- U.S. Historic district
- Location within North Carolina Location within the United States
- Location: Jct. of N. Cool Spring and Grove St., Fayetteville, North Carolina
- Area: 5 acres (2.0 ha)
- Built: 1785
- Built by: Lauder, George
- NRHP reference No.: 98001209
- Added to NRHP: September 25, 1998

Cross Creek Cemetery is a cemetery located in Fayetteville, North Carolina, near a creek of that name that "meanders for more than a mile from downtown Fayetteville to the Cape Fear River." It was established in 1785. The cemetery is organized into five numbered sections and is managed by a cemetery office within Fayetteville–Cumberland County Parks & Recreation.

== History ==
The original section, known as Cross Creek Cemetery Number One was established in 1785 and expanded in 1833. It contains approximately 1,170 gravemarkers dating from 1786 to 1964.This cemetery is the oldest cemetery in Fayetteville.

After the Civil War ended, the Ladies' Memorial Association of Fayetteville had all soldiers who had been killed in battle—along with those who had died and been buried in various nearby locations—interred (or re-interred) in Cross Creek Cemetery. The group then raised the funds to erect a Confederate Soldiers Monument in Cross Creek, the first Confederate monument in North Carolina; it was dedicated on December 30, 1868.

In 1915, the Cross Creek Cemetery Commission was created via an act of the North Carolina General Assembly, providing for the maintenance of the cemetery.

Cross Creek Cemetery #1 was added to the National Register of Historic Places in September 1998 as a national historic district. In June 2010, "more than fifty headstones were damaged and in disarray" in Cross Creek Cemetery #1, following a report of vandalism.

== Notable burials ==
Politicians

- J. Bayard Clark, United States Representative (1929–49)
- James C. Dobbin, United States Secretary of the Navy (1853–57)
- Wharton J. Green, United States Representative (1883–87)
- Edward J. Hale, United States Ambassador to Costa Rica (1913–17)
- John G. Shaw, United States Representative (1895–1897)
- Charles Manly Stedman, Lieutenant Governor of North Carolina (1885–89) and United States Representative (1911–30)
- Warren Winslow, Speaker of the North Carolina Senate (1854–55) and United States Representative (1855–61)

Others

- Robert Adam (1759–1801), merchant and first captain of the Fayetteville Independent Light Infantry
- Elliot Daingerfield (1859–1932), artist
