= Dr. William C. Verdery House =

Historic house in North Carolina, United States

- U.S. National Register of Historic Places
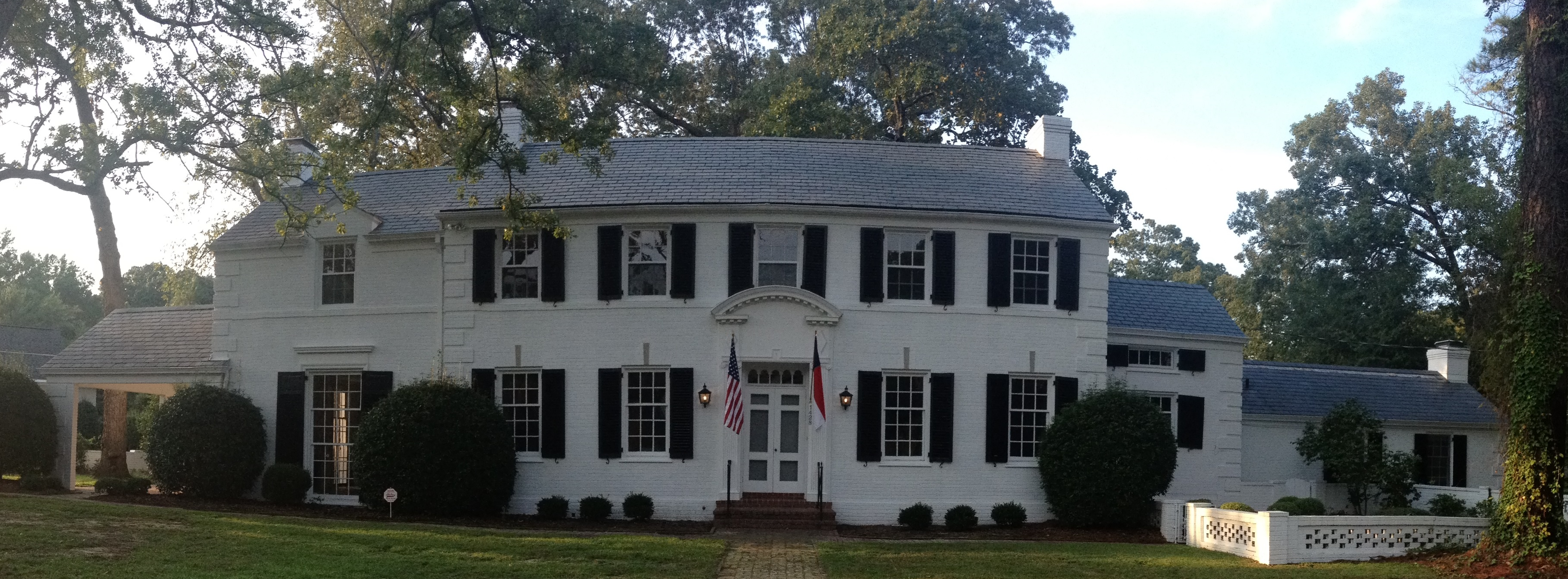

- Location within North Carolina Location within the United States
- Location: Fayetteville, North Carolina
- Coordinates: 35°3′25″N 78°54′16″W
- Area: 2 acres (0.81 ha)
- Built: 1936
- Built by: Reinecke & Dillehey
- Architect: Holleyman Jr, William C.
- Architectural style: Colonial Revival
- NRHP reference No.: 07000904
- Added to NRHP: September 5, 2007

Dr. William C. Verdery House is a historic home located at Fayetteville, Cumberland County, North Carolina. It was built in 1936, and is a Colonial Revival-style brick dwelling. It consists of a two-story, main block flanked by a two-story wing and a one-story porch wing on the west and a one-story wing and recessed two-bay wing on the east. It is topped by a slate gable roof and features an Ionic order entrance surround.

It was listed on the National Register of Historic Places in 2007.
