= Westlawn (Fayetteville, North Carolina) =

Historic house in North Carolina, United States

- U.S. National Register of Historic Places
- Location within North Carolina Location within the United States
- Location: 1505 Fort Bragg Rd., Fayetteville, North Carolina
- Coordinates: 35°3′33″N 78°54′22″W
- Area: 1.5 acres (0.61 ha)
- Built: 1858
- Built by: Ruffin and Christopher Vaughan
- Architectural style: Greek Revival
- NRHP reference No.: 80002815
- Added to NRHP: September 22, 1980

Westlawn is a historic home located at Fayetteville, Cumberland County, North Carolina. It was built in 1858, and is a two-story, five-bay, frame dwelling with a double-pile center-hall plan in the Greek Revival style. It features a one-story, hip roofed porch supported by Doric order columns. Also on the property is a contributing hip roofed smokehouse with cupola.

It was listed on the National Register of Historic Places in 1980.
