= Kyle House =

Historic house in North Carolina, United States

- U.S. National Register of Historic Places
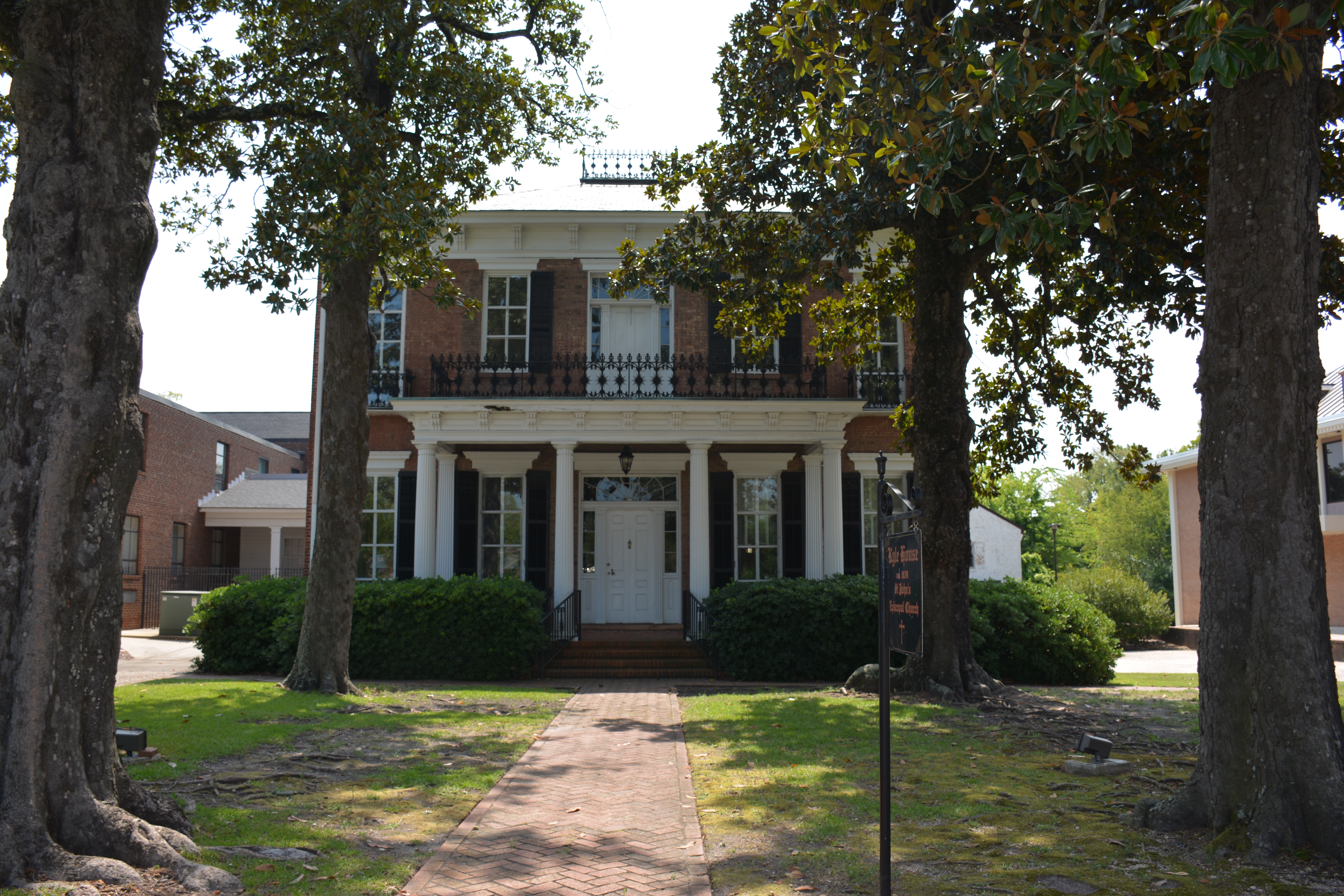

- Location within North Carolina Location within the United States
- Location: 234 Green St., Fayetteville, North Carolina
- Coordinates: 35°3′21″N 78°52′36″W
- Area: 1 acre (0.40 ha)
- Built: c. 1855
- Architectural style: Greek Revival, Italianate
- NRHP reference No.: 72000957
- Added to NRHP: June 19, 1972

Kyle House is a historic home located at Fayetteville, Cumberland County, North Carolina.

The original Kyle House, home to merchant James Kyle, burned in a city fire in 1831. Rumor had it that the great fire began in the Kyle House's kitchen. It was then rebuilt in about 1855 as a two-story, five-bay, brick town house with Greek Revival and Italianate style design elements. It features a three-bay wide one-story porch with a flat roof supported by four fluted Doric order columns.

It was listed on the National Register of Historic Places in 1972.
