= Carolina Theater (Fayetteville, North Carolina) =

Historic building in North Carolina, US

- U.S. National Register of Historic Places
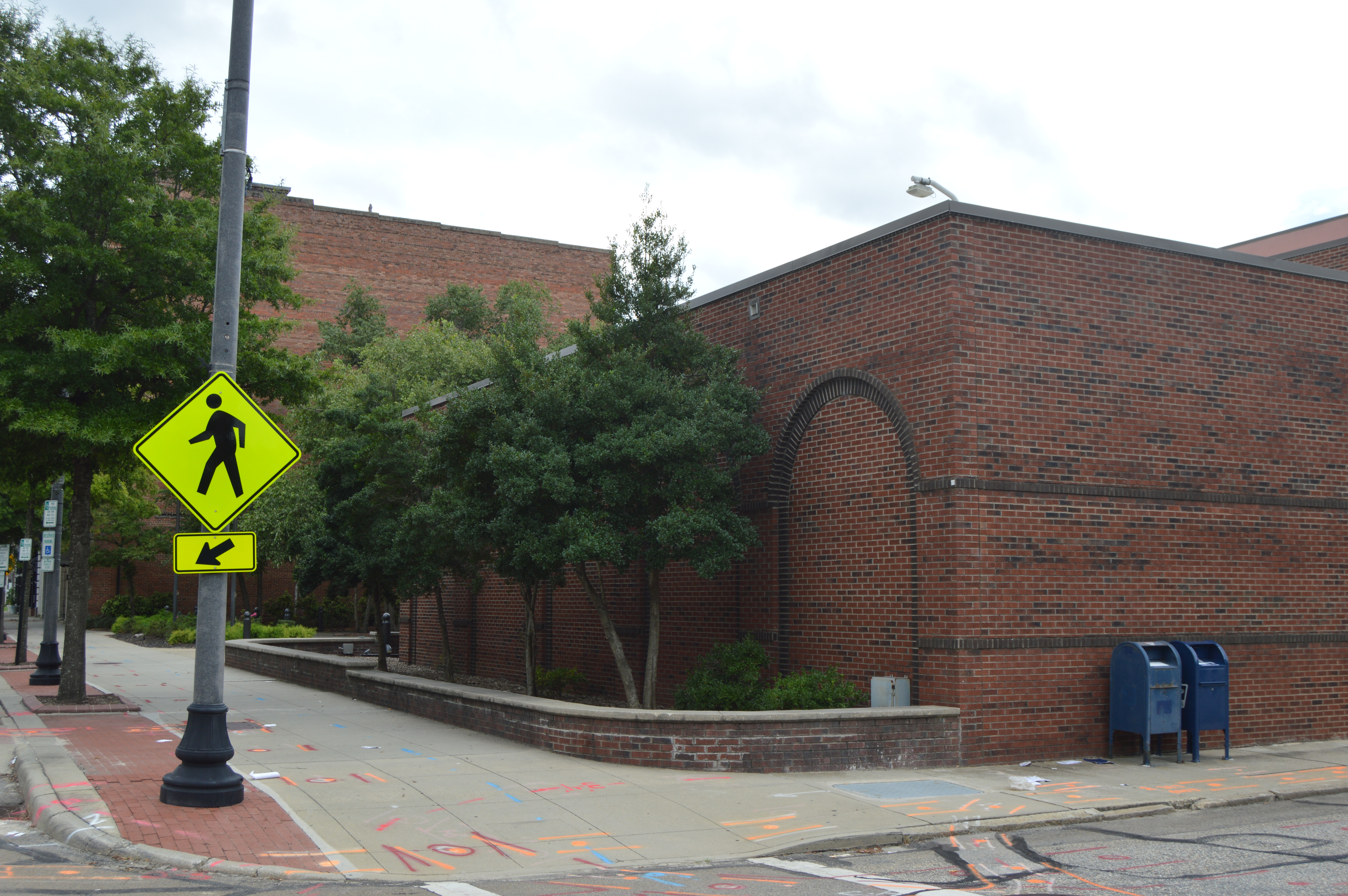
- Site of the theater, now occupied by City Hall

- Location within North Carolina Location within the United States
- Location: 443 Hay St., Fayetteville, North Carolina
- Coordinates: 35°3′15″N 78°53′3″W
- Area: less than one acre
- Built: 1927
- Architectural style: Exotic Revival
- MPS: Fayetteville MRA
- NRHP reference No.: 83001847
- Added to NRHP: July 7, 1983

Carolina Theater was a historic movie theater located at Fayetteville, Cumberland County, North Carolina. It was built in 1927, and was an oversize two-story brick rectangular building in the Moorish Revival style. The front facade featured terra cotta, clay, brickwork, and decorative stone or concrete friezework. The theater closed on October 19, 1978. It has been demolished.

It was listed on the National Register of Historic Places in 1983.
