= Fayetteville Ice and Manufacturing Company: Plant and Engineer's House =

Historic house in North Carolina, United States

- Fayetteville Ice and Manufacturing Company:Plant and Engineer's House
- U.S. National Register of Historic Places
- Location within North Carolina Location within the United States
- Location: 436 Rowan St. and 438 Rowan St., Fayetteville, North Carolina
- Coordinates: 35°3′36″N 78°53′0″W
- Area: 3 acres (1.2 ha)
- Built: 1908
- MPS: Fayetteville MRA
- NRHP reference No.: 83001851
- Added to NRHP: July 7, 1983

Fayetteville Ice and Manufacturing Company: Plant and Engineer's House is a historic ice factory and home located at Fayetteville, Cumberland County, North Carolina. The ice plant was built in 1908, is constructed of brick and is composed of several sections including an ice storage room, a tank or freezing section, and an engine room. The engineer's house is a one-story center-hall plan frame dwelling with a rear ell and hip roof. It features a one-story full-facade porch with Tuscan order columns.

It was listed on the National Register of Historic Places in 1983.
