= Prince Charles Hotel =

- U.S. National Register of Historic Places
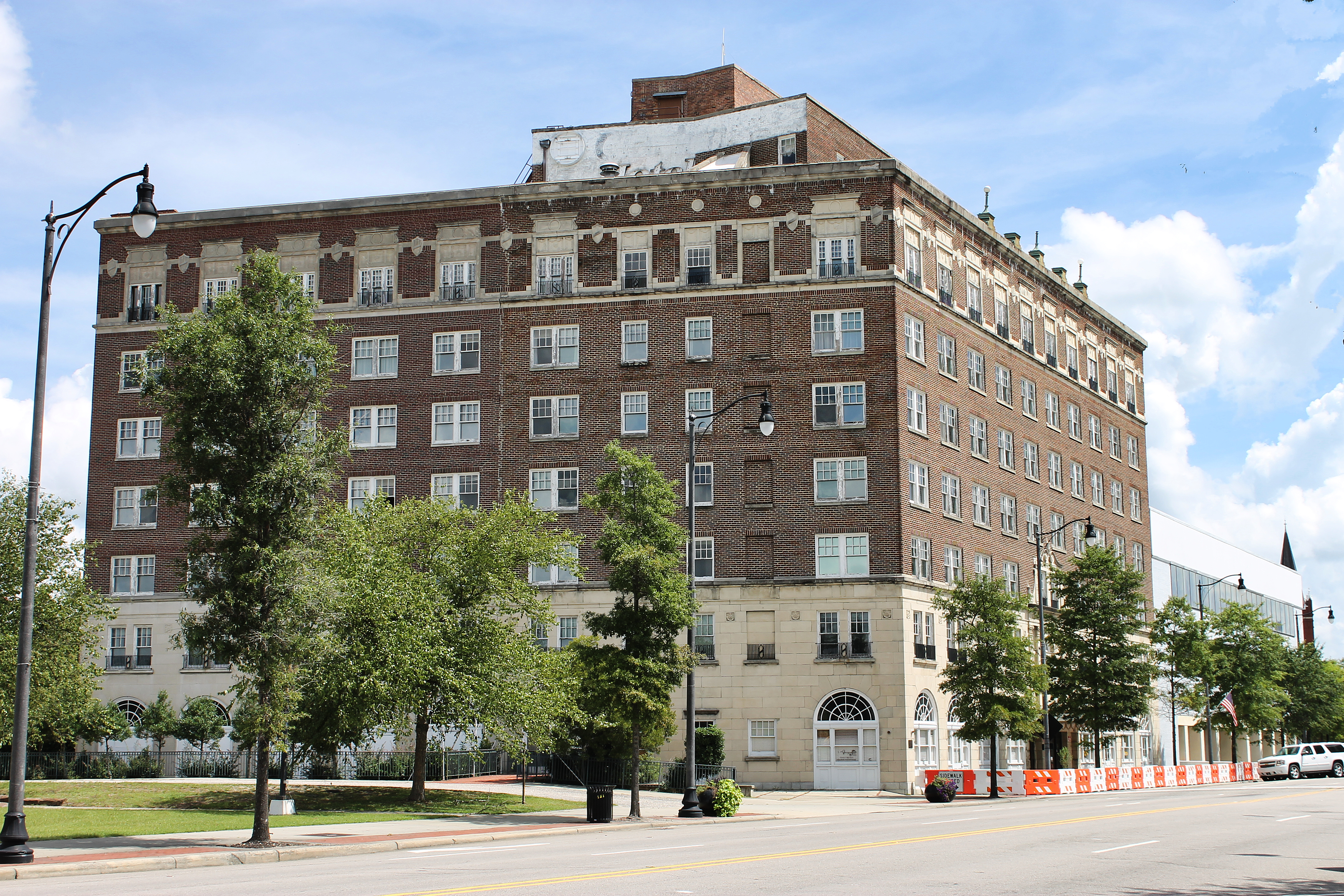
- Prince Charles Hotel, September 2014

- Location within North Carolina Location within the United States
- Location: 430 Hay St., Fayetteville, North Carolina
- Coordinates: 35°3′16″N 78°53′0″W
- Area: less than one acre
- Built: 1923-1925, 1942
- Architectural style: Colonial Revival, Italian Renaissance
- MPS: Fayetteville MRA
- NRHP reference No.: 83001870
- Added to NRHP: July 7, 1983

The Prince Charles Hotel is a historic hotel building located at Fayetteville, Cumberland County, North Carolina.

== History ==
Construction of the Prince Charles Hotel began in 1923 and the hotel opened in April 1925. It is a seven-story, Colonial Revival style steel frame building sheathed in brick and concrete. It features an Italian Renaissance style palazzo. The original section contained 125 rooms. In the early 1940s, Carl and Richard Player sold the hotel to Dr. R.L. Pittman and his son Raymond, who constructed a 60-room addition in 1942, at a cost of $150,000.

As the hotel's fortunes declined, the hotel became a flophouse, renting rooms for only $8 a night. The city of Fayetteville bought the Prince Charles in 1978 for $178,000 and closed the hotel in October 1979. It was listed on the National Register of Historic Places in 1983. The hotel was restored by Greensboro developer John Nagel and reopened in 1986, but closed in 1990 after it was unable to make payments on a $2.5 million loan.

The hotel was sold for $1.5 million to Southern National Bank, the building's biggest loan-holder. They resold the hotel in 1992 to Dr. Menno Pennink and other local investors for $950,000. They brought in Radisson Hotels to manage the property, which was renamed the Radisson Prince Charles Hotel & Suites. In 2004, the hotel was sold to R.K. Properties of Maryland. The new owners switched management to Choice Hotels and the hotel became the Clarion Prince Charles Hotel. In 2007, the hotel, facing default, was sold at auction for $1.9 million to New York investor John Chen. Chen announced plans to build an adjoining 30-story mixed-use skyscraper, which would contain apartments and offices. The tower was never begun, and the hotel began another period of decline, renting rooms by the month, before it was closed by the city in 2010, due to fire code and building code violations.

The building was purchased by Durham-based developer Jordan Jones in 2014 for $200,000. An $18 million reconstruction project began in 2017, in which every two hotel rooms were rebuilt as one apartment. The apartment building opened in 2019 as The Residences at the Prince Charles.
