= Camp Ground Methodist Church =

Historic church in North Carolina, United States

- U.S. National Register of Historic Places
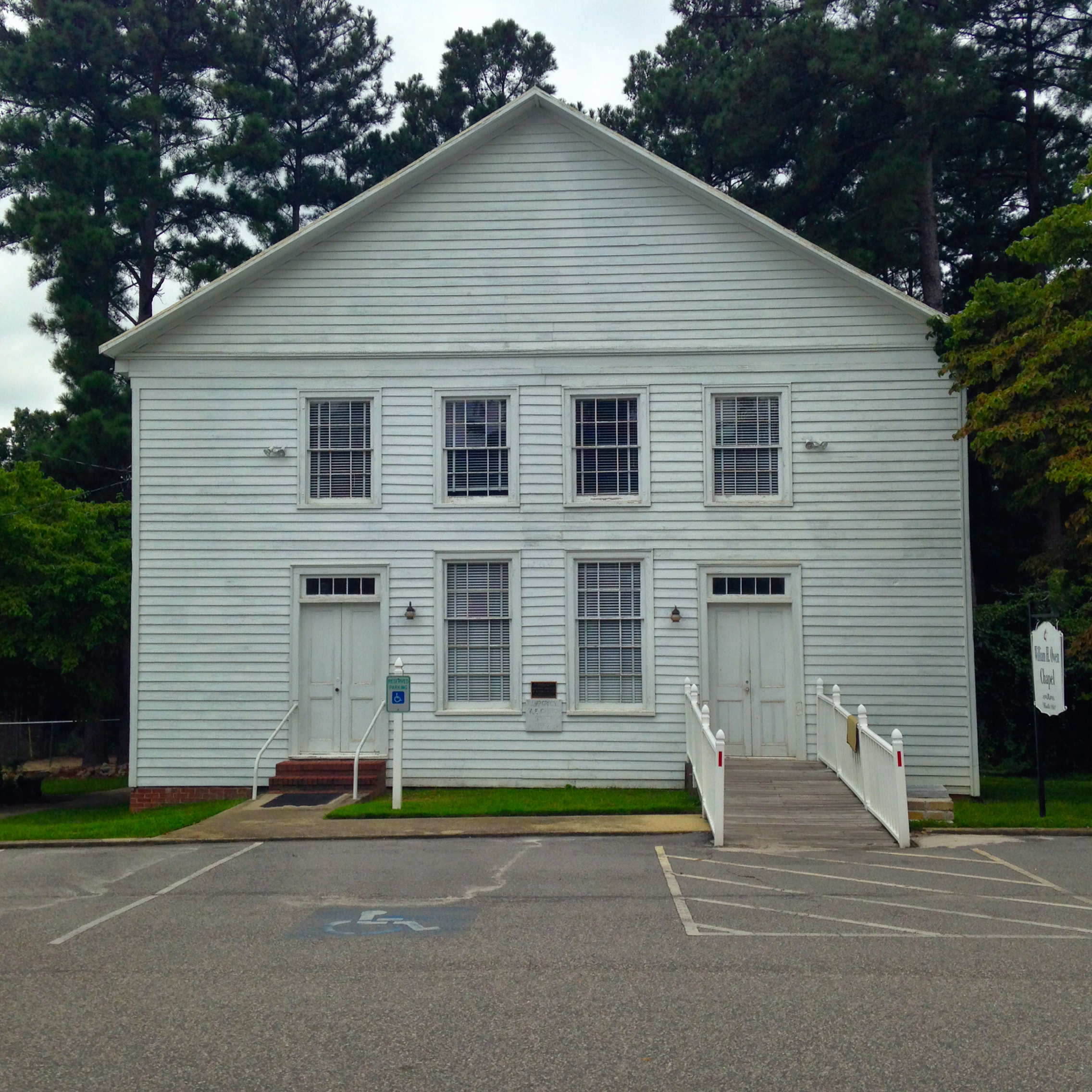

- Location within North Carolina Location within the United States
- Location: Camp Ground Rd., Fayetteville, North Carolina
- Coordinates: 35°4′4″N 78°58′22″W
- Area: 7.2 acres (2.9 ha)
- Built: 1858-1862
- Built by: Vaughn, Christopher; Vaughn, Ruffin
- Architectural style: Greek Revival
- MPS: Fayetteville MRA
- NRHP reference No.: 83001845
- Added to NRHP: July 07, 1983

Camp Ground Methodist Church is a historic Methodist church on Camp Ground Road in Fayetteville, Cumberland County, North Carolina. It was built between 1858 and 1862, and is a two-story, four bay by five bay, gable-end frame building with double front entrances in the vernacular Greek Revival style. The site was originally used for seasonal camp meetings but the building served as a permanent home for a congregation. The building was moved back from the road to make room for the new church building.

It was listed on the National Register of Historic Places in 1983.
