= Averasboro =

Averasboro may refer to:

- Averasboro, North Carolina
- Battle of Averasborough, fought March 16, 1865
- Averasboro Battlefield Historic District
- Averasboro Battlefield and Museum
