= David Marshall Williams =

American murderer and firearms designer

- David Marshall Williams
- Born: November 13, 1900; Cumberland County, North Carolina, U.S.
- Died: January 8, 1975 (aged 74); Raleigh, North Carolina, U.S.
- Other name: "Carbine" Williams
- Occupations: Gunsmith, Author
- Known for: Murder of Deputy Sheriff Al Pate, Inventor of the floating chamber & short-stroke gas piston

David Marshall Williams (November 13, 1900 – January 8, 1975) was an American firearms designer and convicted murderer who invented the floating chamber and the short-stroke gas piston. Both designs used the high-pressure gas generated in or near the breech of the firearm to operate the action of semi-automatic firearms like the M1 Carbine.

== Early life ==
David Marshall Williams was born in Cumberland County, North Carolina, the son of James Claude Williams by his second wife, Laura Susan Kornegay. He was the eldest of seven children and the younger half brother of the five surviving children from the first marriage of James Claude Williams to Eula Lee Breece. James Claude Williams was a wealthy and influential landowner of hundreds of acres in and around Godwin, North Carolina.

As a young boy, he worked on his family's farm. He was expelled from school during the eighth grade by Godwin School Principal H.B. Gaston and began work in a blacksmith shop. At the age of 15 he enlisted in the Navy by claiming he was 17 years old. His Navy enlistment was short-lived when the Navy became aware of his true age.

In 1917, he enrolled in Blackstone Military Academy. He failed to complete the first semester due to his expulsion for theft of government property in possession of the school. Several rifles and 10,000 rounds of ammunition were found in his trunk by Col. E.S. Ligon, owner of the academy, who found Williams had shipped the stocks from the rifles home and refused to return them.

On August 11, 1918, in Cumberland County, he married Margaret Cooke and they later had one child, David Marshall Jr.

After his marriage, he obtained employment as a manual laborer with the Atlantic Coast Line Railroad. Several weeks later, while working with a railway team, he pulled a handgun and shot at a bird flying by, missing the bird but succeeding in having his employment terminated by his supervisor, Captain McNeill, section master.

=== Murder of Deputy Alfred Jackson Pate ===
Williams began operating an illegal distillery near Godwin, North Carolina. On July 22, 1921, the Cumberland County Sheriff and five deputies seized the still and product after the workers fled. While transporting the evidence away from the scene, the deputies came under gunfire from the woods. Riding away from the scene on the police car sideboard, Deputy Sheriff Alfred Jackson Pate was struck by two bullets and died at the scene. Williams was arrested for the murder the following day.

Coroner's Inquest testimony on August 1, 1921, followed by the arraignment on August 2, 1921, revealed a total of five shots had been fired at the deputies from a single location. One of the deputies present at the shooting identified Williams as the person who fired the rifle at Deputy Pate. Williams was held to answer for first degree murder with the possibility of a death sentence. Attorneys representing Williams then notified the court that he could not be tried for the charges against him owing to insanity. Williams and five black workers whom he hired to run the still were charged with operating the still.

On October 11, 1921, a 12-man jury was impaneled to hear the testimony and decide the issue of Williams' sanity. Testimony started on October 12 and continued for four days. Williams was again identified by the deputy sheriff as the person who shot at Deputy Pate. The gunshots had come from the direction in which Williams had run, and all five workers employed by Williams testified that they ran in a different direction. The hearing ended in a hung jury (11-1 for sanity).

On November 22, 1921, his attorneys withdrew the insanity plea and Williams pleaded guilty to second degree murder. Immediately afterwards, Williams and his five workers pleaded guilty to the charge of making liquor.

On November 25, 1921, Williams received a sentence of a "term of Thirty Years at hard labor, to wear felon stripes" for the murder of Deputy Pate. On the same day, one of the black workers employed by Williams, Ham Dawson, was indicted and tried in Cumberland County Superior Court on the charge of secret assault on Deputy Pate. Williams testified during the trial that he had fired the first shot but didn't intend to kill the deputy. Dawson fired the remaining shots with the intent to kill the deputy. The same day, the all-white 12-man jury voted 12-0 for acquittal and Dawson was released.

== Prison years ==
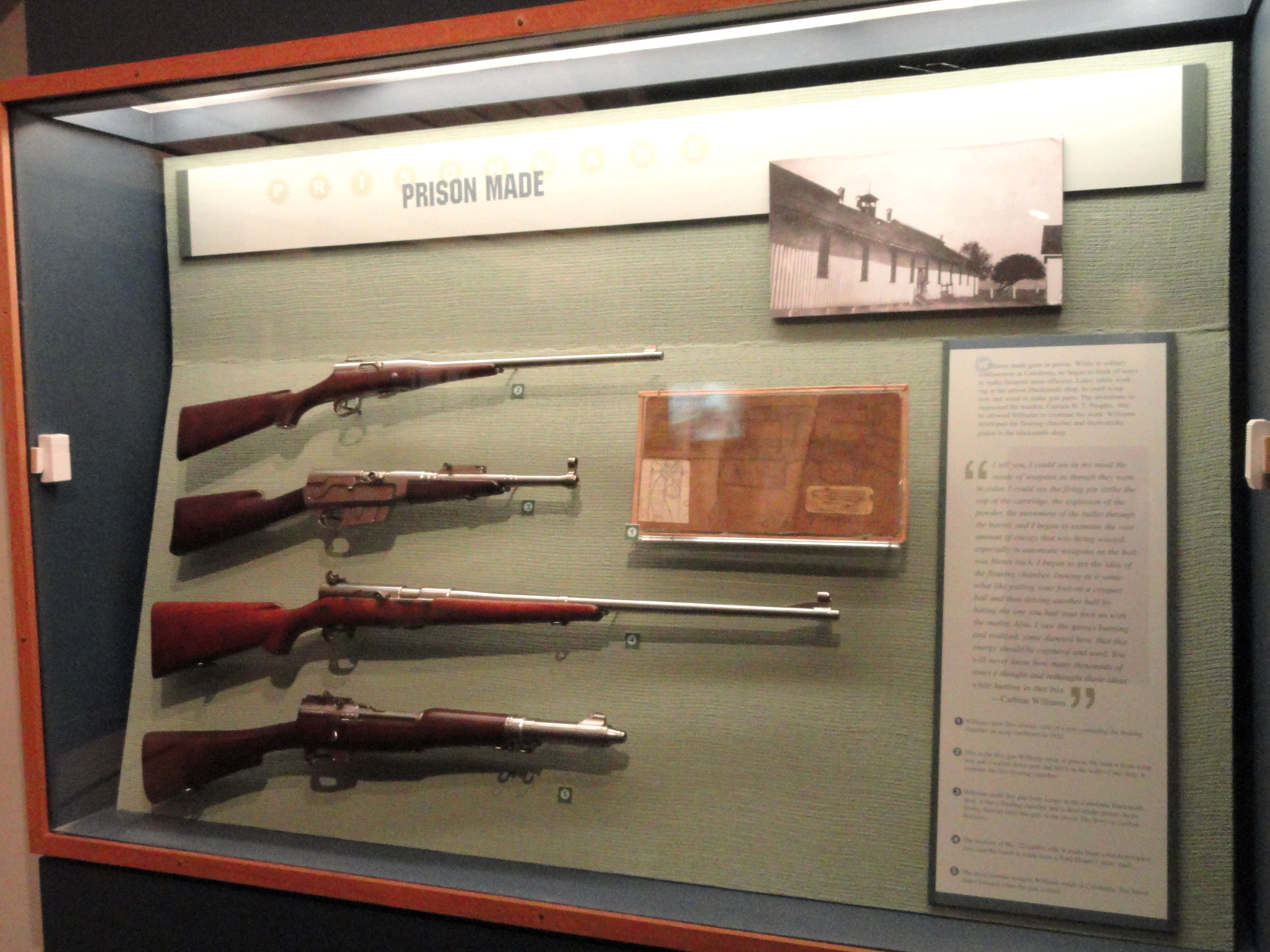
Early carbines created while in prison

While serving time at the Caledonia State Prison Farm in Halifax County, North Carolina, Williams related that the superintendent, H.T. Peoples, noted his mechanical aptitude and allowed him access to the prison's machine shop, where he demonstrated a knack for fashioning his own tools the shop lacked. He began servicing the weapons used by the guards at the prison. His skills in the machine shop permitted him to stay ahead of his assignments and allowed him time to develop his ideas for self-loading firearms.

He would save paper and pencils and stay up late at night drawing plans for various firearms. His mother sent him a drafting set and technical data on guns and eventually provided him with patent attorney contacts, who were unable to help him as long as he was incarcerated.

Williams designed and built four semi-automatic rifles while in prison. All four used the high-pressure gas within the breech as a cartridge was fired to operate their semi-automatic actions. The means used to accomplish this was a floating chamber containing the cartridge that channeled the gas at the front of the chamber to force the floating chamber backwards into the bolt with sufficient energy to operate the action. Rearward movement of the chamber was limited to a short stroke to impact the bolt face, in effect making the floating chamber a short-stroke gas piston. All four rifles are part of the permanent David Marshall Williams display in the North Carolina Museum of History.

== Commutation and parole ==
His family started a campaign to commute his sentence, and they were joined by the sheriff to whom he had surrendered. The widow of the man he was convicted of killing was approached and agreed his sentence should be commuted if his work would help the country. The request for commutation was submitted to North Carolina Governor Angus McLean on November 22, 1927.

On December 16, 1927, North Carolina Governor Angus McLean commuted the sentence from thirty years to "a minimum of ten and maximum of twenty years".

Records of the Office of Superintendent, N.C. State Prisons indicate Williams was "regularly discharged from the State's Prison by Expiration of Sentence" on September 29, 1929.

== Firearms development ==
Back in Cumberland County, he set to work perfecting his inventions, filing his first patents on February 2, 1931. Amongst these was a patent application entitled “Automatic Firearm” U.S. patent 2,090,656 published August 24, 1937. This application detailed his concept for the use of the high-pressure gas in or near the breech to operate the action of a semi-automatic firearm. The application and subsequent patent detail several different designs to accomplish this, including the floating chambers he manufactured on the four rifles he built while imprisoned.

=== Colt Manufacturing Company ===
In 1931, Colt Manufacturing Company introduced the Colt Ace pistol, a .22 long rifle caliber rimfire version of Colt's M1911A1 .45 ACP pistol for training purposes. This pistol was specific to the .22 rimfire cartridge, with a recoil equivalent to its cartridge. In 1933, Williams was contracted by Colt to redesign the Colt Ace with his floating chamber. The end result was the Colt Service Ace (“Firearm” U.S. patent 2,090,657 published August 24, 1937), a .22 caliber rimfire pistol with a recoil stronger than that of the Colt Ace but less than that of its M1911A1 .45 ACP counterpart.

In 1938, Colt introduced the Colt .22 - .45 Service Model Conversion Unit (Ace). Also designed by Williams, the conversion unit could be used to convert the 1911A1 .45 ACP pistol to .22 long rifle caliber rimfire for training. The kit allowed for the pistol to be converted back to its original 1911A1 .45 ACP. The kit was also used to convert the earlier Colt Ace pistol for use as a Colt Service Ace with the floating chamber.

=== U.S. Ordnance Department ===
After two years, he went to Washington, D.C. to show his work to the War Department. He received his first contract to modify the .30 caliber Browning machine gun using the floating chamber system to fire .22 caliber rimfire ammunition to facilitate inexpensive training. His conversions were permanent. Two patents were filed for this design on Mar 19, 1935, and published February 22, 1938: “Automatic Weapon Patent” U.S. patent 2,027,892 and "Belt Feeding Means for Guns" U.S. patent 2,027,893.

The original Williams design was redesigned and improved upon by others into a .22 caliber conversion unit that allowed the M1919A1 to be converted back and forth between .30 caliber and .22 caliber rimfire (“Automatic Firearm” U.S. patent 2,108,817 published February 22, 1938). This conversion kit was designated the “Trainer, Machine Gun, Caliber .22 M3” (for the 1919A1). Subsequent versions were created for the 1919A4 (Caliber .22 M4) and AN-M2 (Caliber .22 M5 .30).

=== Remington Arms ===
Around 1937, Remington Arms contracted Williams to produce a .22 long rifle caliber rimfire semi-automatic rifle utilizing his floating chamber intended for the commercial market. The rifle designed and developed by Williams can be seen in two patents: “Firearm” U.S. patent 2,336,146 and “Firearm” U.S. patent 2,373,622.

The Williams design was not accepted by Remington. The rifle was redesigned by Remington employees K. Lowe and C.C. Loomis using the Williams floating chamber. The rifle was designated the Remington Model 550 and introduced in 1941.

The patents for the rifle, “Firearm” U.S. patent 2,353,679 published July 18, 1944, and “Firearm” U.S. patent 2,356,491 published August 22, 1944, credited the earlier Williams patent (U.S. patent 2,090,656) of the Williams floating chamber for use with a .22 long rifle caliber rimfire rifle. This rifle was the first semi-automatic rimfire rifle capable of operating with either the .22 short, .22 long, or .22 long rifle cartridges.

=== Winchester Repeating Arms and World War II ===
Management at Winchester Repeating Arms Company was already aware of the work of Williams when in 1938 one of its patents (U.S. patent 2,069,887) was contested by Williams as it infringed on one of his earlier patents for a sear (U.S. patent 2,242,496). Winchester agreed with Williams and negotiated a settlement.

The Ordnance Department's General Julian Hatcher was impressed by Williams's work and in 1938 recommended Winchester hire him because he showed the greatest native ability of anyone Hatcher knew. Winchester entered into negotiations with Williams, who was hired full time by Winchester on July 1, 1939.

Williams was assigned the task of redesigning a semi-automatic rifle invented by Jonathan Edmund Browning, half brother of John Browning and Matt Browning. The design had been purchased by Winchester, who had also hired Jonathan Browning to improve the design. Winchester hoped the Browning design might replace the M1 rifle invented by John Garand.

One of the problems encountered was the gas system that operated the rifle's semi-automatic action. By May 1940, Williams had fitted the rifle with a short-stroke gas piston outside the bore of the barrel that used the gas forward of the breech to cause the piston to strike the operating slide and cycle the action. Winchester designated this rifle the Model G30M. The rifle developed with this version of the short-stroke gas piston was used during U.S. Ordnance Department trials at Quantico, Virginia, and Aberdeen, Maryland, from March through April 1940, followed by trials with the Marines in San Diego, California, during the fall and winter of 1940.

Based on the experience gained during these trials, Winchester directed Williams to redesign the rifle to correct additional problems, chamber it for the standard military rifle cartridge .30 M2 (.30-'06), and make it as light as possible. Williams completed the changes by May 1941, with the result weighing only 7.5 lb (3.4 kg). Winchester designated this rifle the G30R.

By May 1941, the U.S. Ordnance Dept. had started trials of a number of submissions for a light rifle design that would eventually be chambered for the .30 caliber Carbine cartridge. Winchester initially decided against developing a submission because of other commitments that included the Browning prototype being worked on by Williams. During the trials of the Model G30M at Quantico and San Diego, it had become apparent to Winchester they were not going to be able to replace the M1 by Garand. When Williams produced the 7.5 lb (3.4 kg) Model G30R, it convinced Winchester they should be able to come up with a prototype for the light rifle trials.

The challenge for Winchester was producing a working light rifle in time for preliminary tests pending a second set of light rifle trials. Williams had already shown he worked at his own pace, so Winchester assigned two other employees to head up the project. When Williams was not included, he was livid. Williams refused to have anything to do with the gun and did not want his name associated with it. Thirteen days after they had begun, Winchester employees completed the first prototype.

The receiver, rotating bolt, slide, and short-stroke gas piston used on this first prototype were based on those used by Williams to produce the Model G30R. Of these four parts, three were designed by Williams from parts already in use on other rifles. The one part Williams could take sole credit for was the short-stroke gas piston that accessed the high-pressure gas near the breech to operate the semi-automatic action.

The preliminary tests of the first prototype by the Ordnance Department on August 9, 1941, proved the design had sufficient merit for Winchester to proceed with the development and submit a light rifle by the September 15, 1941, deadline for the final trials.

For the second prototype, Winchester formed a second team consisting of the two prior employees and others with Williams as the project director. Three days later, Winchester removed Williams from the team after assessment of a dispute between Williams and the others that had forced the project to a halt. The team continued the work on the second prototype without Williams, whom Winchester allowed to design his own prototype concurrent with the others.

On September 12, 1941, the second prototype light rifle designed by the team was complete and ready for submission but for two problems that had yet to be resolved. Williams was asked to help the others sort out the problems, and collectively solutions were found that allowed the prototype to be transported and submitted to the Ordnance Department by the deadline. The Ordnance trials were completed and the Winchester light rifle was adopted as the Carbine, Caliber .30, M1 Carbine on September 30, 1941. Williams had been unable to complete his own light rifle prototype in time for the trials. The prototype by Williams was a downsized version of his G30R design. Photographs of this carbine are retained by the Springfield Armory Museum and the Cody Firearms Museum Buffalo Bill Historical Center.

Williams had previously entered into a license agreement with Winchester on September 9, 1940, for use of his patented short-stroke gas piston (U.S. patent 2,090,656) in exchange for a royalty payable on the basis of the value of each gun manufactured containing the invention. From the end of 1941 and into 1942, Western Cartridge Co. (Winchester) negotiated with the Ordnance Department over the design of the M1 Carbine. In February 1942, the Ordnance Department proposed a one-time lump sum royalty payment of $886,000 in exchange for a royalty-free production license. On March 19, 1942, Williams voluntarily entered into another agreement with Winchester, accepting 26.411 percent of this lump sum ($234,100.46 over and above his salary) in lieu of royalty payments. Winchester signed the agreement on March 20, 1942.

The contract for the M1 Carbine cited 14 patents as part of its design. Four of these were held by Williams as an assignor of Western Cartridge Company (Winchester). Two were related to the Model G30 (“Takedown Firearm” U.S. patent 2,336,431 published December 7, 1943, and “Gas Operated Self-Loading Firearm” U.S. patent 2,346,954 published April 18, 1944). The third was Winchester's patent for the M1 carbine itself (“Automatic Firearm Construction” U.S. patent 2,308,257 published January 12, 1943) with Williams as the assignee. The fourth was the carbine's short-stroke gas piston (“Piston Means for Gas-Operated Firearms” U.S. patent 2,341,005 published February 8, 1944). Winchester felt the earlier Williams patent for his floating chamber gas piston (“Automatic Firearm” U.S. patent 2,090,656) was sufficiently different from the design used in the M1 carbine, and that they would have won an inevitable court battle with Williams. But they saw no point in it, as Winchester retained the patent rights with Williams as the company's assignee and the time taken by a court battle would be counterproductive to the overall goal of manufacturing the carbine for timely use by American forces already at war.

Williams continued working at Winchester on the Model G30, a light machine-gun version known as the Winchester Automatic Rifle (WAR) intended to replace the M1918 Browning Automatic Rifle (BAR), and a .50 caliber anti-tank rifle version. As the design of several of these firearms neared completion, the war's end in August 1945 and subsequent budget cutbacks ended these projects. Williams assisted Winchester throughout the war on a number of smaller projects, including the design and development of the rear flip sight for the M1 carbines.

=== Winchester Repeating Arms – Post World War II ===
Along with his .30 M2 Browning Military Rifle, Jonathan Edmund Browning had developed, patented, and sold to Winchester a design for a semi-automatic shotgun U.S. patent 1,628,226, U.S. patent 1,842,581, U.S. patent 1,971,597. After the war, Winchester assigned Williams to the project of developing the shotgun for sporting use.

As an assignee of Olin Industries (Winchester) Williams obtained two patents related to his design: “Inertia Operated Bolt Lock” U.S. patent 2,476,232 published July 12, 1949, and “Firearm with Movable Chamber and Sealing Sleeve” U.S. patent 2,847,787 published August 19, 1958.

Winchester introduced the shotgun in 1954 as its Model 50 Automatic Shotgun in 12 and 20 gauge. The shotgun featured an Inertia Operated Bolt Lock designed by Williams. The bolt block and cartridge sat within a large floating chamber. When the gun was fired, the gas forward of the floating chamber forced the chamber to the rear approximately 1/10th of an inch in a short stroke that generated the energy necessary for the bolt block to disengage the rear of the floating chamber and operate the semi-automatic action. This was the first semi-automatic shotgun with a fixed nonrecoiling barrel. In 1960 Winchester introduced its Model 59 Automatic Shotgun, which also utilized the Williams design from the Model 50. This model featured the Winlite 'glass' barrel; it was a thin tube wrapped with microfilament glass fibre. This model could be had with the first ever screw-in Versalite choke tubes.

== Movie fame ==
In 1952, MGM released the film Carbine Williams starring James Stewart as Williams with Jean Hagen as his wife, Maggie. The movie details Williams's life from his discharge from the Navy to his release from prison. The movie premiered April 24, 1952, at the Colony Theater in Fayetteville, North Carolina. After the premier, Williams traveled the country, appearing where the film was shown and offering autographs and photographs.

The story presented in the movie Carbine Williams was entertainment based on the story as told to MGM's producers by David Marshall Williams, verbally, in writing, and as a technical consultant during the production of the movie. The original movie script is archived within the MGM Collection by the Academy of Motion Pictures Arts and Sciences, Special Collections, Margaret Herrick Library, Beverly Hills, California. A cover page indicates the script was prepared by a member of the MGM script department on March 15, 1951. The script consists of two documents: The Williams Story by David Marshall Williams (copyrighted by Williams February 9, 1951 - Copyright AA0000174857) and Army Carbine: The Rifle that was Born in Prison by David Marshall Williams "as told to B. Fay Ridenour".

The original story of the Army Carbine: The Rifle that was Born in Prison, as authored by Williams and told by Ridenour, a newspaper reporter for The Charlotte Observer, was published prior to the creation of the movie script by The Charlotte Observer on February 25, 1951. The article includes an introduction by Ridenour declaring the article to be a correct accounting of events. Within the article, Williams is quoted as stating: "In 1939, I went to work for Winchester and it was while working for them that I invented the U.S. Army Carbine that is in use today".

Returning to Godwin, N.C., after his travels for the movie, Williams was thereafter known as "Carbine Williams" and personally adopted the moniker. During newspaper, magazine, and radio interviews stimulated by the movie, Williams repeated his story as presented in Army Carbine: The Rifle that was Born in Prison.

== Final years ==
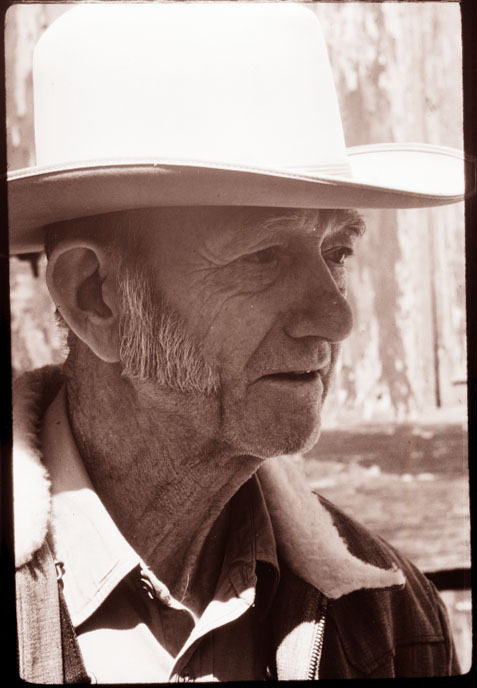
Williams, ca. 1970

The November 6, 1960, edition of The Fayetteville Observer included an article entitled "Condition of Williams Is Still Critical”: “David Marshall (Carbine) Williams, 66, of Godwin, Rte. 1, inventor of the Army carbine, was in critical condition Saturday at midnight in a Dunn Hospital. Williams' physician, Dr. L.R. Doffermyre, said his examination late Saturday night indicated that Williams was 'extremely critical'. The Cumberland County man was admitted to the hospital earlier last week for treatment of a liver ailment. He had been unconscious at least three days." The article indicates that his wife and son and three grandchildren were at his bedside. The November 14, 1960, Fayetteville Observer included a follow-up report indicating Williams was recovering.

During the 1960s, Williams remained at home with his wife and family. Williams eventually donated his personal collection and entire workshop to the North Carolina Museum of History. On June 22, 1971, the museum held an opening ceremony of the David Marshall Williams exhibit at the museum, where it remains on permanent display. The display includes the entire building of the Williams workshop. All contents remain in the same location where Williams left them.

In 1972, David Marshall Williams was admitted to Dorothea Dix Hospital in Raleigh, North Carolina. His wife described his condition as being unable to recognize his own family. Williams remained at the hospital until his death on January 8, 1975.

His death certificate lists the primary cause of his death as cardiorespiratory arrest with contributing factors of bronchial pneumonia and organic brain syndrome. Organic brain syndrome (OBS) is decreased mental function owing to a medical disease other than a psychiatric illness. Examples are stroke, Alzheimer's disease, liver failure, long-term alcohol abuse, and withdrawal from alcohol, amongst many others.

Williams is buried in the cemetery of the Old Bluff Presbyterian Church near Wade, North Carolina.

== Legacy ==
While the legend of “Carbine Williams” has garnered Williams more attention over the years, his design, redesign, and development of firearms that used the high-pressure gas in or near the breech to operate their semi-automatic action have remained a significant contribution used in the design and development of new firearms and as a starting point for other inventors to come up with new ideas.

The U.S. patent for the highly successful Benelli Shotgun (U.S. patent 4,604,942) references Williams's patent for his “Inertia Operated Bolt Lock” U.S. patent 2,476,232. The Weatherby Model SA-08 and SA-459 semi-automatic shotgun lines manufactured for Weatherby by Armsan in Istanbul, Turkey, use an external gas piston housing and short-stroke gas piston that impacts an operating rod to cycle the semi-automatic action. Armsan manufactures and markets in Europe its own line of semi-automatic shotguns using this design.

== See also ==
- Carbine Williams (Jimmy Stewart film, 1952)
