= Jane Evans Elliot =

American diarist (1820–1886)

- Born: Jane Smith Evans; April 7, 1820; Fayetteville, North Carolina, US
- Died: December 5, 1886 (aged 66); Ellerslie Plantation, North Carolina, US
- Occupation: Diarist
- Known for: The Diaries of Jane Smith Evans Elliot
- Spouse: Col. Alexander Elliot

Jane Evans Elliot, born Jane Smith Evans (1820–1886), was a diarist during the American Civil War who lived on the Ellerslie Plantation outside of Fayetteville, North Carolina. Her writings focus on "the many changes of girl hood, and maiden hood" before, during, and after the Civil War.

Jane's diaries consist of three separate books that span the course of her lifetime: Book I (1837-1862), Book II (1863-1870), and Book III (1872-1882). The diaries were first published in 1908 by the Edwards and Broughton Print Company. In 2007, the Presbyterian Historical Society of Montreat, North Carolina, donated the original books to the University of North Carolina at Chapel Hill. The diaries are now housed in the Southern Historical Collection at the Louis Round Wilson Library.

== Life ==
Jane was born on April 7, 1820, in Fayetteville, North Carolina, likely at Oak Grove, Myrtle Green, or Smithville. Her grandfather, Capt. David Evans, had been given a land grant from King George III. In 1775, David Evans met with several other Cumberland County, North Carolina, residents to sign the Liberty Point Resolves in response to the Battles of Lexington and Concord.

Colonel Alexander Elliot, Jane Evans Elliot's husband

On January 12, 1847, Jane married Alexander Elliot, a lumberman and colonel in the state militia. Alexander previously had served in the North Carolina House of Commons (1824-1825) and the North Carolina Senate (1826-1827). Jane joined her husband at his residence on the Ellerslie Plantation after marrying. The couple had several children together: Mary Eliza, Jennie, Henry, George, Emily (Emmie), Jonothan (Jonnie), and Katie. Around the age of 35, Jane became sick with an unknown illness and was expected to die. The early death of her sister Mollie in 1855 likely exacerbated the illness. Jane would not fully recover until 1859.

Jane viewed the outbreak of the Civil War with apprehension, noting how "every day brings something sad." She helped other ladies in the Cape Fear River Valley make uniforms and knit socks for volunteers in the 51st North Carolina Infantry Regiment and other Confederate units. Her husband donated sabers and Bowie knives to a local cavalry regiment.

My heart shrinks from making this appalling scene. Our country once so glorious, is now in the midst of Civil War! Merciful God! Spare this Land of Promise.

— Jane Evans Elliot, April 26, 1861.

Lieut. Alexander (Sandie) Elliot, Jane Evans Elliot's nephew

The Elliot family at Ellerslie actively followed news from the front and viewed the Civil War as a war for independence. Although Jane's husband was too old for military service during the war and her children too young, many of her close relatives joined the Confederate Army. Jane's brothers served during the war, and one spent four months in a Union POW camp at Johnson's Island. Jane's nephew, Lieut. Alexander Elliot (Sandie), was killed in action at the Battle of Cold Harbor. Sandie was very close with the Elliot family at Ellerslie. Jane's daughter, Mary Eliza, plucked a plume from her hat to give to Sandie before he left for war. Sandie's fiancée, Sophie Mallet, served as a private tutor to the children at Ellerslie. Robert Smith, another family cousin, was also killed in action during the war.

During Union Maj. Gen. William T. Sherman's march to Fayetteville, Federal troops raided Jane's home at Ellerslie. The Union soldiers took all the family's blankets, clothes, silverware, and livestock. Jane wrote, "We have no way of getting to church as they took our carriage, buggy, wagons & every horse & mule & ox." It is unclear whether the raid was sanctioned by the Union Army. A Union officer later asked Jane's husband if he thought $50,000 would be enough to recuperate the family's losses at Ellerslie.

== Views on slavery ==
Jane Evans Elliot's diary is an important historical reference that highlights the dichotomy of many southern women who staunchly supported the Confederacy while secretly disliking slavery. Elliot's views on slavery were likely influenced by her Christian faith. As a young woman, she wrote "…I ought to exhibit such deportment as would become a Christian and a Lady. And to servants that do so much for me ought I not to be kind and not censorious." Elliot attached familial names to her family's slaves, such as "Brother Bill" and "Aunt Edy", and recorded their deaths with as much grief as she expressed for the deaths of her own relatives. She viewed the word "slave" as a pejorative and used the euphemism "servant" in its place. Elliot would not use the word "slave" until after the war. She reflected in 1865, "The war has closed & the slaves all emancipated. We have had many & sore trials to bear growing out of this social change. Let us weekly bow to the Divine will. We rest in the blessed assurance that 'he doeth all things well'…"
