= North Carolina Highway 82 =

State highway in North Carolina, US

North Carolina Highway 82

Route information
- Maintained by NCDOT
- Length: 16.0 mi (25.7 km)
- Existed: 1934–present
- Tourist routes: Averasboro Battlefield Scenic Byway

Major junctions
- West end: US 421 / NC 55 in Erwin
- US 301 in Godwin; I-95 near Falcon
- East end: US 13 near Cooper

Location
- Country: United States
- State: North Carolina
- Counties: Harnett, Cumberland

Highway system
- North Carolina Highway System; Interstate; US; State; Scenic
| ← NC 81 | → NC 83 |

North Carolina Highway 82 (NC 82) is a primary state highway in the U.S. state of North Carolina. The highway traverses where the Battle of Averasborough took place and connects the towns of Erwin, Godwin and Falcon. Though the road is signed as east and west, it runs physically north from Erwin to US 13 to the south near Cooper.

== Route description ==
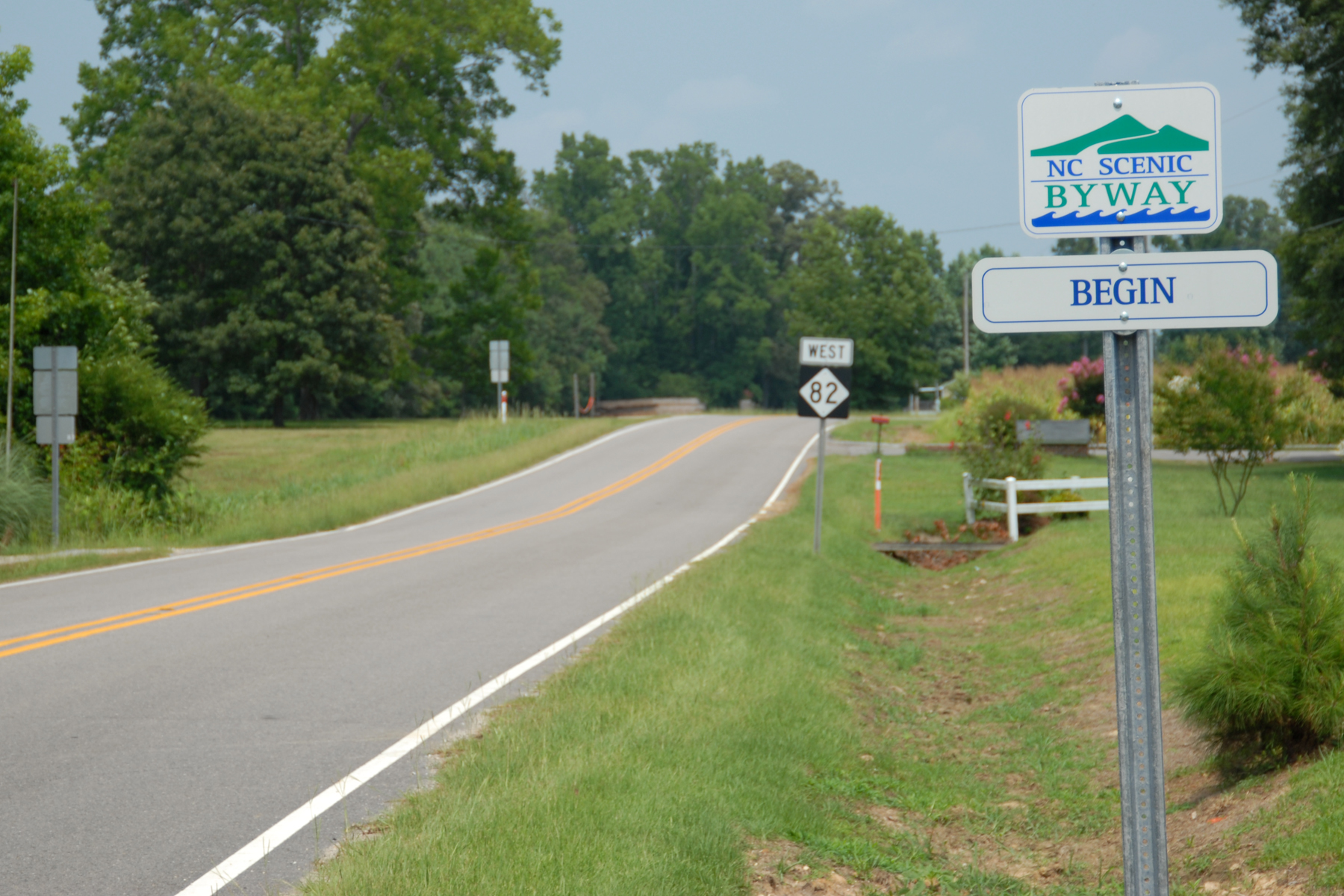
Averasboro Battlefield Scenic Byway

NC 82 is a two-lane rural highway that begins at US 421/NC 55 (Jackson Boulevard) in Erwin. Immediately, NC 82 is in a concurrency with NC 217. Traveling south through Erwin on 13th Street, it splits from NC 217 and parallels the Cape Fear River towards Godwin. Halfway between Erwin and Godwin is the Averasborough Battlefield Museum, at the site of a noted Civil War battle that happened on March 16, 1865. Within the town limits of Godwin, it intersects US 301 and east of there, along the Godwin–Falcon Road, is I-95 and the town of Falcon. Going in a southerly direction, in parallel of the South River to its east, it heads towards US 13; near its eastern terminus it makes a sharp bend onto Herb Farm Road, avoiding a section of road where a bridge once existed crossing over the South River and into Sampson County. NC 82 ends 3/10 mile (0.48 km) from the Cumberland-Sampson county line.

NC 82 overlaps with one state scenic byway, the Averasboro Battlefield Scenic Byway, between Erwin and Godwin The highway from J Street in Erwin to Burnett Road near Godwin is also part of North Carolina Bicycle Route 5.

== History ==
NC 82 was established in 1934 as a renumbering of a segment of NC 55, between US 421 (Denim Drive), in Erwin, to US 301 in Godwin. In 1957, NC 82 was extended to its western terminus at Jackson Boulevard, replacing part of US 421/NC 55. In 1970, NC 82 was extended east on new primary routing to its current eastern terminus at US 13.

== Major intersections ==
| County | Location | mi | km | Destinations | Notes |
|---|---|---|---|---|---|
| Harnett | Erwin | 0.0 | 0.0 | US 421 / NC 55 (Jackson Boulevard) / NC 217 begins – Dunn, Lillington, Coats | Western end of NC 217 concurrency |
| Harnett | Erwin | 1.4 | 2.3 | NC 217 south (13th Street) – Linden | Eastern end of NC 217 concurrency |
| Cumberland | Godwin | 9.7 | 15.6 | US 301 (Dunn Road) – Fayetteville, Dunn | |
| Cumberland | | 10.8– 10.9 | 17.4– 17.5 | I-95 – Fayetteville, Dunn | |
| Cumberland | | 15.4 | 24.8 | US 13 (Goldsboro Road) – Fayetteville, Newton Grove, Goldsboro | |
1.000 mi = 1.609 km; 1.000 km = 0.621 mi: Concurrency terminus
