= North Carolina Highway 217 =

State highway in North Carolina, US

North Carolina Highway 217

Route information
- Maintained by NCDOT
- Length: 9.8 mi (15.8 km)
- Existed: 1933–present

Major junctions
- South end: US 401 near Linden
- North end: US 421 / NC 55 in Erwin

Location
- Country: United States
- State: North Carolina
- Counties: Cumberland, Harnett

Highway system
- North Carolina Highway System; Interstate; US; State; Scenic
← NC 216	→ NC 218

North Carolina Highway 217 (NC 217) is a primary state highway in the U.S. state of North Carolina. The highway connects the town of Linden to nearby Erwin and Fayetteville.

== Route description ==
NC 217 is a two-lane rural highway that serves as a back-door road between Erwin and Fayetteville, connecting the town of Linden. In Erwin, it has a concurrency with NC 82. Also in Erwin, the highway is concurrent with North Carolina Bicycle Route 5 from the southern NC 82 intersection to J Street.

== History ==
Established in 1933 as a new primary routing, it traveled from NC 21 (now U.S. Route 401 or US 401) to NC 55 (now NC 82). In 1936, it was extended north (concurrency with NC 82) to US 421/NC 60 (now Denim Drive). In 1957, it was extended north again to its current northern terminus at US 421/NC 55.

== Junction list ==
County	Location	mi	km	Destinations	Notes
Cumberland		0.0	0.0	US 401 – Fayetteville, Lillington	
Harnett	Erwin	8.4	13.5	NC 82 east – Godwin	East end of NC 82 overlap
Harnett	Erwin	9.8	15.8	US 421 (Jackson Boulevard) / NC 55 (13th Street) / NC 82 ends – Lillington, Dunn, Coats	West end of NC 82 overlap
1.000 mi = 1.609 km; 1.000 km = 0.621 mi: Concurrency terminus
