= Averasboro Battlefield Historic District =

Historic district in North Carolina, United States

- U.S. National Register of Historic Places
- U.S. Historic district
- Location within North Carolina Location within the United States
- Nearest city: Roughly bounded by Cape Fear R., NC 1780, the Black R., NC 1801, near Erwin, North Carolina
- Coordinates: 35°15′16″N 78°39′52″W
- Area: 4,700 acres (1,900 ha)
- Built: 1865, 1872
- Architectural style: Georgian, Federal, et.al.
- NRHP reference No.: 00001425
- Added to NRHP: May 10, 2001

Averasboro Battlefield Historic District is a national historic district located near Erwin, Harnett County, North Carolina, United States. It encompasses four contributing buildings, three contributing sites, three contributing structures, and one contributing object on the battlefield associated with the American Civil War Battle of Averasboro of March 15–16, 1865. They include the separately listed Oak Grove and Lebanon plantations, along with a Commemorative Marker (1872), Chicora Cemetery and over 4,000 acres of rural agricultural land.

It was listed on the National Register of Historic Places in 2001.

The American Battlefield Trust and its partners have acquired and preserved 520 acres (2.1 km^{2}) of the Averasboro battlefield.
