= HRJ =

HRJ may refer to:

- Hardy–Ramanujan Journal
- Harnett Regional Jetport, in North Carolina, United States
