= Evans Metropolitan AME Zion Church =

Historic church in North Carolina, United States

- U.S. National Register of Historic Places
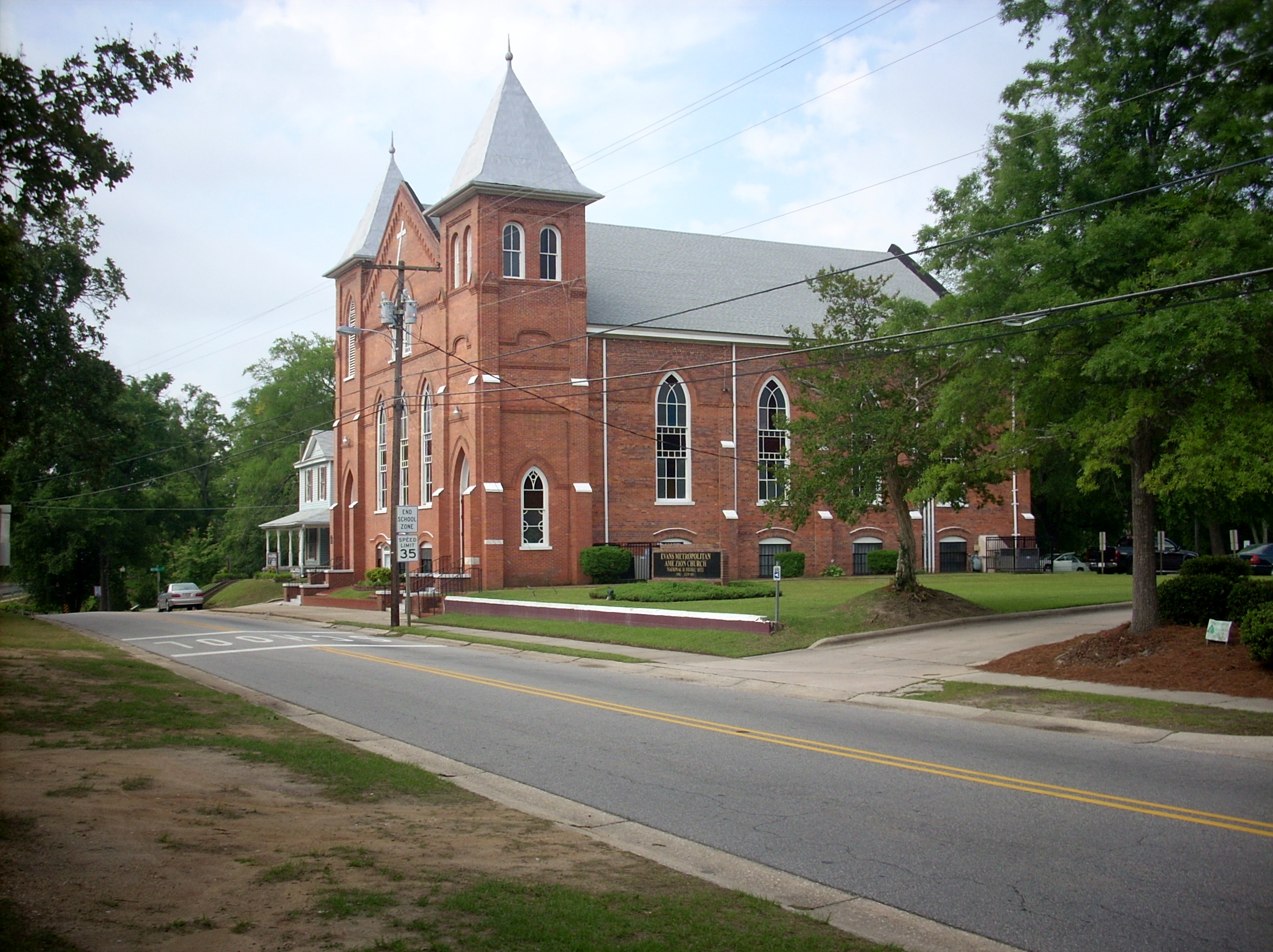

- Location within North Carolina Location within the United States
- Location: 301 N. Cool Spring St., Fayetteville, North Carolina
- Coordinates: 35°3′12″N 78°52′53″W
- Area: less than one acre
- Built: 1893-1894
- Built by: Williams, James; Steward, Joseph
- Architectural style: Gothic Revival
- MPS: Fayetteville MRA
- NRHP reference No.: 83001850
- Added to NRHP: July 07, 1983

Evans Metropolitan AME Zion Church is a historic African Methodist Episcopal church located at 301 N. Cool Spring Street in Fayetteville, Cumberland County, North Carolina. It was built in 1893–1894, and is a five bay, rectangular brick building in the Gothic Revival style. The front facade features flanking towers. Also on the property is a contributing house built in 1913 used as an office/administration building. It is a two-story frame house with a hipped roof and wraparound porch. It is one of the oldest standing Methodist churches built in Fayetteville and the second oldest standing church built in the city, next to the First Presbyterian Church in Anne Street.

It was listed on the National Register of Historic Places in 1983.

== History ==
The first church built on the site of the current church was first founded in the 1800 by free black preacher Henry Evans and was first chartered in 1801 as Evans Chapel. The city first served both black and white people, up until the establishment of the Hay Street United Methodist Church, where it then became a predominantly black congregation.

After the American Civil War by 1872, the chapel became part of the African Methodist Episcopal Zion Church. In 1893, construction begun to replace the previous structure with the present one. Constructions tasks were carried out by black artisans from the local community.

In September 2018, Hurricane Florence struck Fayetteville, leaving the building being severely damaged as a result. It wasn't immediately rebuilt for five years and was reopened in February 2023.

== Description ==
The church exhibits the Gothic Revival style built on a rectangular floor plan with an east-west orientation. Two towers face the eastern façade and the middle bays are filled with elongated lancet windows above small basement windows. The towers both have double door entrances with lancet windows and pyramidal cap roofs with finials at the top.

The sides of the church have four bays, each of them consists of a lancet window and are divided by brick buttresses. The rear has a small frame extension and a rectangular apse which houses the choir and pipe organ.

The inside has a basement, a main floor ordered by the narthex, nave, and then the chancel, and a full balcony on all four sides. The interior is faced with beaded boards, making the structure having a dim lighting.

The walls were clad with beaded wainscoting and double horizontal polished boards. The ceiling is heavily beamed with a cross-tie intersection at the main bressummer running the length of the church. The ceiling is filled with the beaded boards and are set in a herringbone pattern. The apron is also face with beaded boards as well.
