= Averasboro, North Carolina =

Town in Cumberland County, NC, USA

Averasboro was a town located in Cumberland County, North Carolina. The town is mostly known for the Battle of Averasboro.

== History ==
The town of Averasboro (originally Averasburg), named after William Avera, was established in 1791 by the North Carolina General Assembly. It is located on the northern bank of the Cape Fear River in northeast Cumberland County, North Carolina, near the county border with Johnston. The town of Averasboro was the site of an American Civil War battle known as the Battle of Averasborough.

Only a cemetery and a Civil War Museum remain.

The township was featured in the Adult Swim thriller Common Side Effects as the location chosen to grow the fictional Blue Angle Mushroom, as a fictional pharmaceutical company had dumped toxic waste there.

== Timeline ==
Event	Date	References
John McAllister established a gristmill	Before 1756	
Avera bought McAllister Grist Mill and opened a tavern at the intersection of Old Stage Road and the ferry dock	1774	
Town established under the name Averasburg	1791	
Averasburg post office established	October 1, 1794	
Town & post office renamed to McNeills	November 10, 1852	
McNeills post office permanently closed	July 14, 1854	
Town renamed to Averysborough:	April 4, 1855	
Averysborough post office established	April 4, 1855	
Battle of Averasborough	March 16–17, 1865	
Town & post office renamed to Averasboro	July 14, 1884	
Averasboro post office permanently closed	December 14, 1903	

== Averasboro Township ==
Averasboro Township, named after the former town, is one of thirteen townships in Harnett County, North Carolina, United States. The township had a population of 12,032 according to the 2021 Census. It is a part of the Dunn Micropolitan Area, which is also a part of the greater Raleigh–Durham–Cary Combined Statistical Area (CSA) as defined by the United States Census Bureau.

Geographically, Averasboro Township occupies 35.61 square miles (92.2 km^{2}) in southeastern Harnett County. The only incorporated municipality within Averasboro Township is Dunn. Averasboro Township is named for the former town of Averasboro.
