= Godwin, North Carolina =

- Town
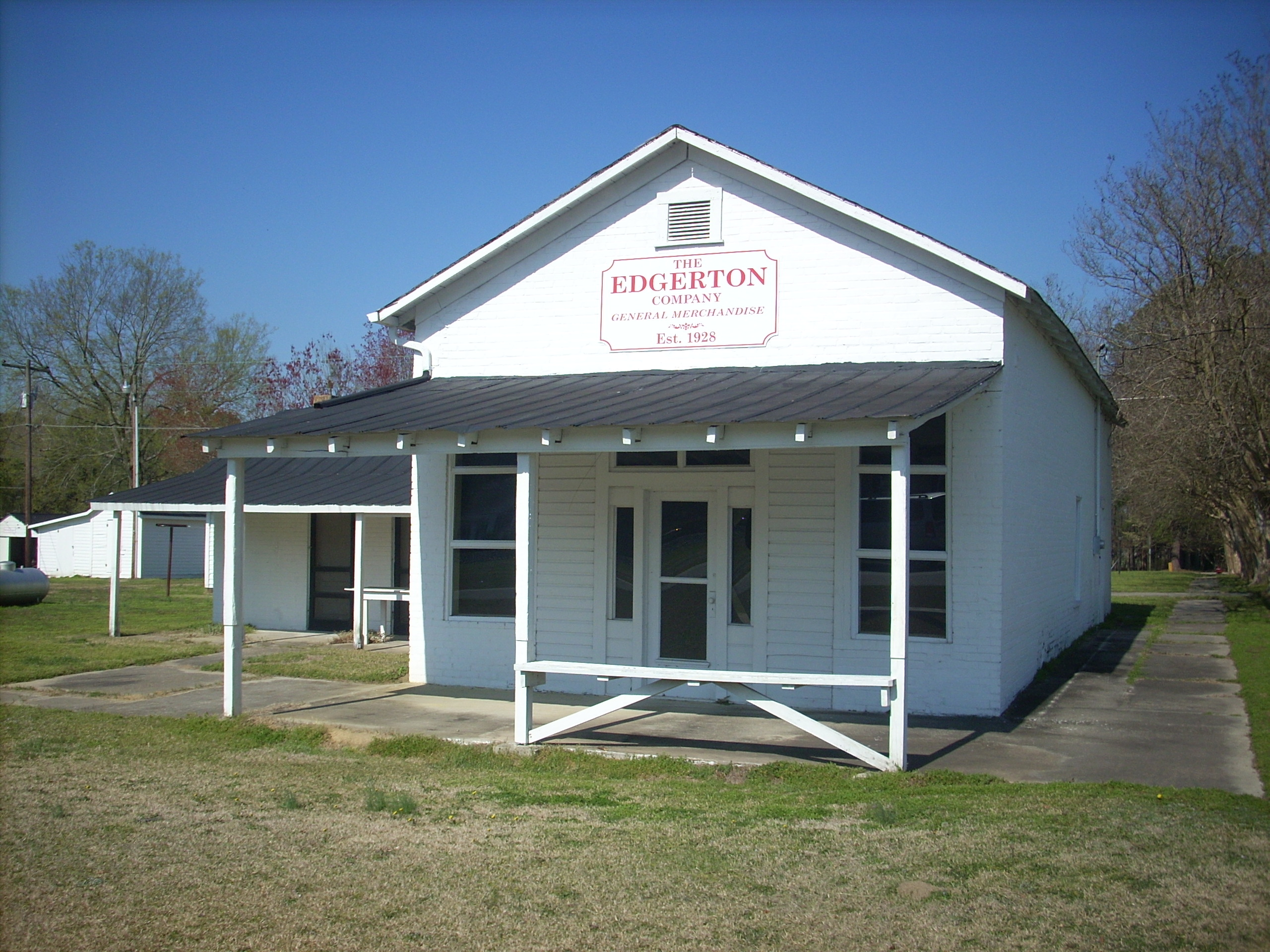
- The old general store

- Location in Cumberland County and the state of North Carolina.
- Coordinates: 35°13′03″N 78°41′00″W
- Country: United States
- State: North Carolina
- County: Cumberland

Government
  - Mayor: Willie Junious Burnette

Area
  - Total: 0.63 sq mi (1.63 km^{2})
  - Land: 0.63 sq mi (1.63 km^{2})
  - Water: 0 sq mi (0.00 km^{2})
- Elevation: 144 ft (44 m)

Population (2020)
  - Total: 128
  - Density: 203.0/sq mi (78.39/km^{2})
- Time zone: UTC-5 (Eastern (EST))
  - Summer (DST): UTC-4 (EDT)
- ZIP code: 28344
- Area codes: 910, 472
- FIPS code: 37-26740
- GNIS feature ID: 2406581
- Website: http://www.godwinnc.com/

Godwin is a town in Cumberland County, North Carolina, United States. As of the 2020 census, Godwin had a population of 128.

== History ==
Godwin was named after Isaac William Godwin, a pioneer settler.

== Geography ==
Godwin is located in northeastern Cumberland County. U.S. Route 301 (Dunn Road) passes through the town, leading northeast 8 miles (13 km) to Dunn and southwest 17 miles (27 km) to Fayetteville, the county seat. North Carolina Highway 82 intersects US 301 in Godwin and leads north 9 miles (14 km) to Erwin and southeast 1 mile (1.6 km) to Interstate 95 at Exit 65.

According to the United States Census Bureau, the town has a total area of 0.50 square miles (1.3 km^{2}), all land.

== Demographics ==
Historical population
Census	Pop.	Note	%±
1910	102		—
1920	90		−11.8%
1930	136		51.1%
1940	123		−9.6%
1950	145		17.9%
1960	149		2.8%
1970	129		−13.4%
1980	233		80.6%
1990	77		−67.0%
2000	112		45.5%
2010	139		24.1%
2020	128		−7.9%
U.S. Decennial Census

As of the census of 2000, there were 112 people, 38 households, and 31 families residing in the town. The population density was 450.2 inhabitants per square mile (173.8/km^{2}). There were 43 housing units at an average density of 172.8 per square mile (66.7/km^{2}). The racial makeup of the town was 73.21% White, 13.39% African American, 4.46% Native American, 2.68% from other races, and 6.25% from two or more races. Hispanic or Latino of any race were 13.39% of the population.

There were 38 households, out of which 34.2% had children under the age of 18 living with them, 57.9% were married couples living together, 10.5% had a female householder with no husband present, and 18.4% were non-families. 15.8% of all households were made up of individuals, and 13.2% had someone living alone who was 65 years of age or older. The average household size was 2.95 and the average family size was 3.19.

In the town, the population was spread out, with 32.1% under the age of 18, 8.0% from 18 to 24, 26.8% from 25 to 44, 18.8% from 45 to 64, and 14.3% who were 65 years of age or older. The median age was 31 years. For every 100 females, there were 89.8 males. For every 100 females age 18 and over, there were 85.4 males.

The median income for a household in the town was $41,250, and the median income for a family was $42,083. Males had a median income of $25,417 versus $22,188 for females. The per capita income for the town was $14,943. There were 8.6% of families and 13.0% of the population living below the poverty line, including 34.4% of under eighteens and 18.8% of those over 64.

== Places of worship ==
Godwin Presbyterian Church was organized in May 1904 as an offshoot of the Old Bluff Church in Wade, North Carolina. It developed from a Sabbath School (Sunday School) that had begun in 1889. The first church structure had a seating capacity of 200 and was used for 30 years before it burned in 1934. While a new building was constructed, the Presbyterian congregation was invited by the Godwin Baptist church to share their facility. The new facility was completed in 1937. The Godwin Presbyterian Church holds an annual homecoming each October. The grounds of the church feature a friendship garden open to all.

== Notable people ==
- Russell Davis, former NFL player
- Luis Fonseca, United States Navy sailor.
- Richard Holmes, former Canadian Football League player.
- David Marshall (Carbine) Williams, firearms designer.
- Dennis Smith Jr., basketball player, born in Godwin.
- Paul Valandra, former politician, served for South Dakota House of Representatives.
