= Winchester model 30 =

- Type: Semi-automatic rifle Automatic rifle
- Place of origin: United States

Service history
- Used by: (testing and field trials); United States Army; United States Marine Corps

Production history
- Designer: Jonathan E. Browning
- Designed: 1939-1945
- Manufacturer: Winchester Repeating Arms

Specifications
- Cartridge: .30-06 Springfield
- Action: Short-stroke piston

The Winchester Model 30 was an experimental self-loading rifle offered to the United States War Department as an alternative to the M1 Garand. Winchester Repeating Arms modified the design to a selective fire Winchester Automatic Rifle after military field trials favored the Garand. Development had not progressed beyond limited-production prototypes when official interest faded at the end of World War II.

== History ==
Soon after adoption of the Garand, the Ordnance Department hired Winchester to evaluate the new M1 rifle. Winchester engineers believed the Garand required unnecessarily expensive manufacturing procedures which would make it impractical for mass production in times of emergency. Winchester then acquired production rights to a self-loading .30-06 Springfield rifle designed by John Browning's half-brother Jonathan E. Browning. Following the designer's death in 1939, Winchester modified the design to use David Marshall Williams' short-stroke piston later successful in the M1 carbine. The Ordnance Department tested the initial model G30 prototype at Aberdeen Proving Ground in September 1940.

=== G30M ===
The United States Marine Corps tested an improved prototype model G30M in comparison to the Garand and the M1941 Johnson rifle using the M1903 Springfield rifle as a control. The Marines evaluated the Winchester model G30M as the least satisfactory of the four rifles tested.

=== G30R ===
As the M1 carbine was entering production, Winchester provided Aberdeen Proving Grounds with an improved prototype model G30R reflecting short-stroke piston knowledge gained from the successful M1 carbine program. The model G30R was provided with detachable box magazines with capacities of 5, 10, 20 or 30 cartridges. The Ordnance Department designated the model G30R as the T10E1; but found it less satisfactory than the Garand.

=== Winchester Automatic Rifle ===
Since the Garand had demonstrated effectiveness as an infantry rifle in combat, the Ordnance Department suggested Winchester revise the design again to include a bipod and selective fire capability as a possible alternative to the M1918 Browning Automatic Rifle (BAR). The Winchester Automatic Rifle (WAR) tested by the Ordnance Department in December 1944 was several pounds lighter than the BAR. Ten more WARs were tested during the summer of 1945 by the Army Infantry Board and by the Marine Corps Equipment Board; but interest in the project ended upon conclusion of Second World War hostilities.
