= Ellerslie (Linden, North Carolina) =

Historic house in North Carolina, United States

- U.S. National Register of Historic Places
- Location within North Carolina Location within the United States
- Location: West of Linden on SR 1607 at the junction with SR 1606, near Linden, North Carolina
- Coordinates: 35°13′50″N 78°52′31″W
- Area: 9 acres (3.6 ha)
- Built: c. 1790
- Architectural style: Greek Revival, Georgian
- NRHP reference No.: 74001344
- Added to NRHP: August 7, 1974

Ellerslie is a historic plantation house located near Linden, Cumberland County, North Carolina. It was built about 1790, and is a 1 1/2-story, six bay by two bay, Georgian style frame dwelling with a two-story Greek Revival style addition. It features a wide shed porch with plastered cove ceiling.

It was listed on the National Register of Historic Places in 1980.

== History ==
Ellerslie's founder, George Elliot, was born in Scotland in 1755. He immigrated to the American colonies around 1774 and soon entered the lumber business along the Cape Fear River Valley. After building Ellerslie sometime between 1790-1801, Elliot emerged as the largest landowner in his district and was an active political leader. In 1788 he represented Cumberland County at the Hillsborough Convention, which had been called to vote on the new United States Constitution.

Ellerslie’s location on the Lower Little River was important for community and commerce. The Little River and the Cape Fear River connected the Highland-Scot community with Wilmington, NC and closely linked the regions commercially. Additionally, the Elliot family cemetery was located where the Little River joins the Cape Fear River.

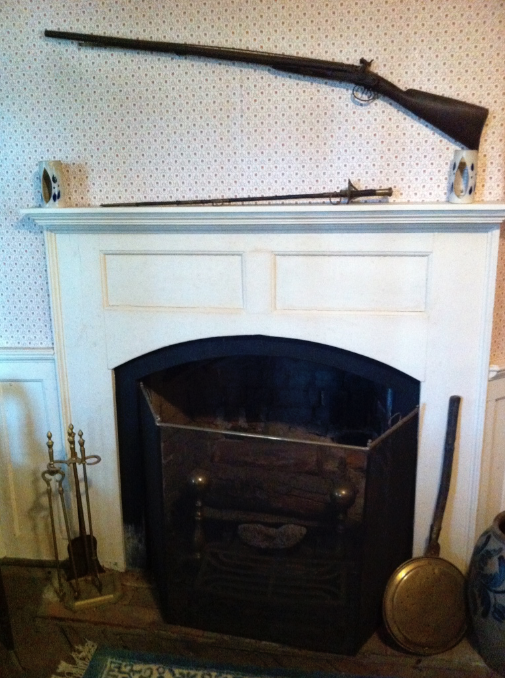
Fireplace in Ellerslie Plantation, NC. Saber of Lieut. Alexander Elliot rests on mantle.

During the American Civil War, the Ellerslie Plantation was used at separate times to quarter both Confederate and Union troops. Prior to the Battle of Averasborough, Federal troops under Union Maj. Gen. William T. Sherman raided Ellerslie. The encounter was recorded by resident and Civil War diarist Jane Evans Elliot:

This day two weeks since, 12 of March was a day of sorrow and confusion never to be forgotten. Sherman’s army reached Fayetteville the day before, and at 9 o’clock Sunday morning, a party of raiders rushed in upon our peaceful home. They pillaged and plundered the whole day and quartered upon that night and staid [sic] until 5 o’clock Monday evening. Some part of the time there were at least three different parties. The house was rifled from garret to cellar. Took all our blankets and all [my husband’s] clothes, all our silver and knives and forks, all our luxuries, leaving nothing but a little meat and corn. They threatened [my husband’s] life repeatedly and one ruffian galloped up to the door and pulled out his matches to fire the house. Oh! it was terrible beyond description. It seems ever present to my mind. One night they strung fire all around us and we took up the children and dressed them and watched all night fearing the fire might consume our dwelling.

— Jane Evans Elliot, March 25, 1865.

== Notable residents ==
- John Newland Maffitt, the renowned Confederate blockade runner, spent part of his childhood on the Ellerslie Plantation after he was adopted around 1824 by his uncle Dr. William Maffitt, a respected Cumberland County physician. The Maffitt family home was on or near the Ellerslie estate. Contrary to some reports, Dr. Maffitt did not own the Ellerslie plantation.
- Jane Evans Elliot (1820–1886), the Civil War memoirist, lived at Ellerslie after marrying Col. Alexander Elliot.
- Henry Elliot, the Elliot Pecan's namesake, was raised at Ellerslie. He was the son of Col. Alexander Elliot and Jane Evans Elliot.
