= Linden, North Carolina =

- Town
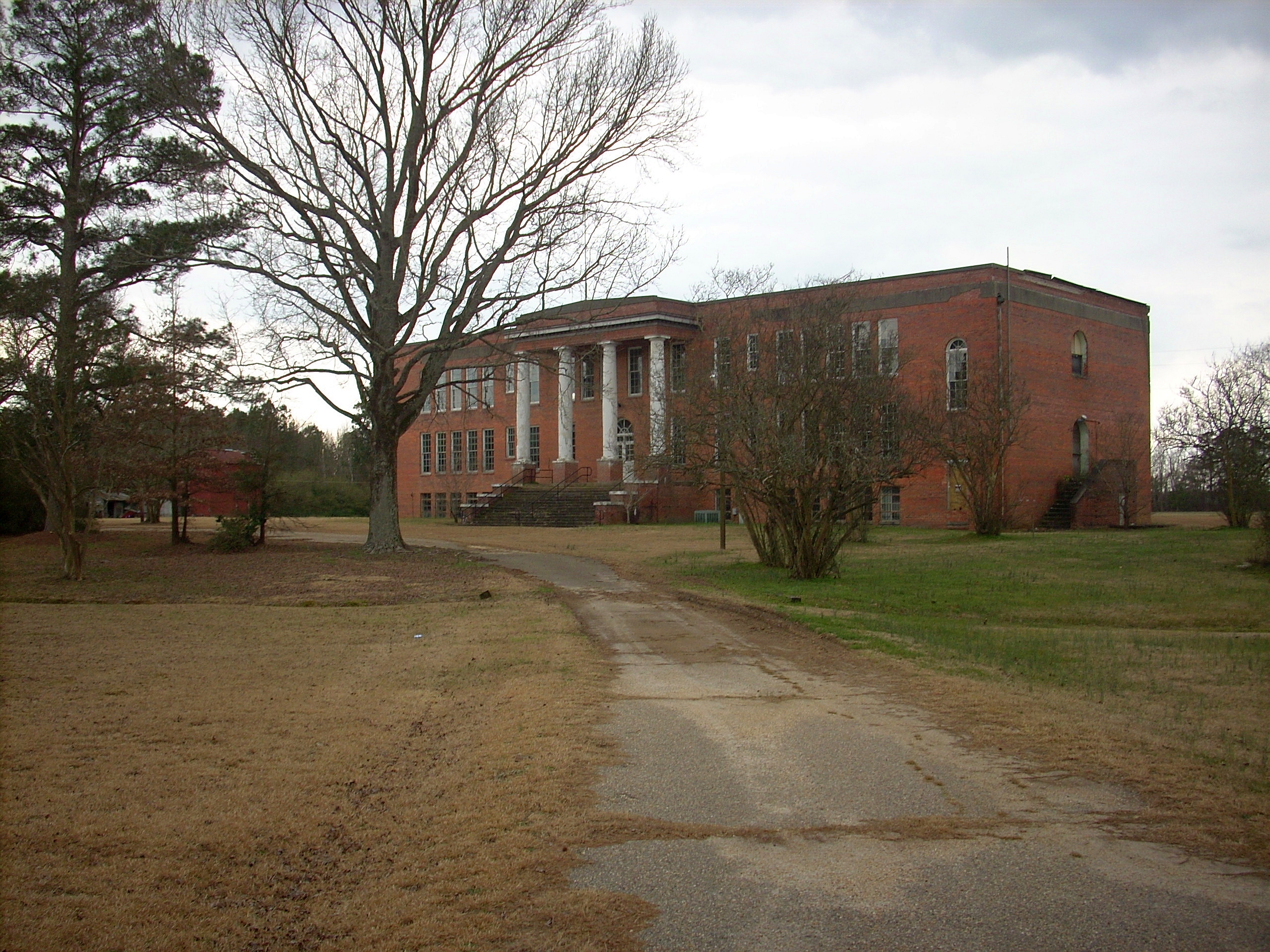
- The long-since closed Linden School

- Location in Cumberland County and the state of North Carolina.
- Coordinates: 35°15′16″N 78°44′51″W
- Country: United States
- State: North Carolina
- County: Cumberland

Government
  - Mayor: Frances Collier

Area
  - Total: 0.55 sq mi (1.42 km^{2})
  - Land: 0.55 sq mi (1.42 km^{2})
  - Water: 0 sq mi (0.00 km^{2})
- Elevation: 118 ft (36 m)

Population (2020)
  - Total: 136
  - Density: 247.4/sq mi (95.54/km^{2})
- Time zone: UTC-5 (Eastern (EST))
  - Summer (DST): UTC-4 (EDT)
- ZIP code: 28356
- Area codes: 910, 472
- FIPS code: 37-38360
- GNIS feature ID: 2406023

Linden is a town in Cumberland County, North Carolina, United States. As of the 2020 census, Linden had a population of 136. The mayor is Frances Collier.

== History ==
Ellerslie, Ivy Burne, and the Dr. Wayman C. Melvin House are listed on the National Register of Historic Places. In 2020, a neo-pagan religion known as the Asatru Folk Assembly (AFA) purchased a former church in Linden to use as a Viking neo-pagan temple serving AFA members in the Southeastern United States. The temple is dedicated to the Viking god Thor and is called "Thorshof" which means "Thor's temple" in Old Norse, the language of the Vikings.

== Geography ==
Linden is located in northeastern Cumberland County and southeastern Harnett County. Its northern border lies just inside Harnett County, whose southern border is here formed by the Little River, a tributary of the Cape Fear River.

North Carolina Highway 217 passes through the town as Linden Road and Mill Road, leading northeast 7 miles (11 km) to Erwin and west 2 miles (3 km) to U.S. Route 401. Via US 401 it is 18 miles (29 km) southwest from Linden to Fayetteville, the Cumberland County seat.

According to the United States Census Bureau, Linden has a total area of 0.50 square miles (1.3 km^{2}), all land.

== Demographics ==
Historical population
Census	Pop.	Note	%±
1920	191		—
1930	174		−8.9%
1940	224		28.7%
1950	194		−13.4%
1960	157		−19.1%
1970	205		30.6%
1980	365		78.0%
1990	180		−50.7%
2000	127		−29.4%
2010	130		2.4%
2020	136		4.6%
U.S. Decennial Census

As of the census of 2000, there were 127 people, 51 households, and 39 families residing in the town. The population density was 263.8 inhabitants per square mile (101.9/km^{2}). There were 58 housing units at an average density of 120.5 per square mile (46.5/km^{2}). The racial makeup of the town was 94.49% White, 3.15% African American, 0.79% Native American, 0.79% from other races, and 0.79% from two or more races. Hispanic or Latino of any race were 2.36% of the population.

There were 51 households, out of which 21.6% had children under the age of 18 living with them, 54.9% were married couples living together, 11.8% had a female householder with no husband present, and 21.6% were non-families. 17.6% of all households were made up of individuals, and 9.8% had someone living alone who was 65 years of age or older. The average household size was 2.49 and the average family size was 2.80.

In the town, the population was spread out, with 20.5% under the age of 18, 9.4% from 18 to 24, 21.3% from 25 to 44, 30.7% from 45 to 64, and 18.1% who were 65 years of age or older. The median age was 44 years. For every 100 females, there were 101.6 males. For every 100 females age 18 and over, there were 102.0 males.

The median income for a household in the town was $41,250, and the median income for a family was $48,750. Males had a median income of $30,625 versus $25,781 for females. The per capita income for the town was $17,617. There were 7.9% of families and 7.9% of the population living below the poverty line, including no under eighteens and 26.7% of those over 64.
