= Carbine Williams =

1952 film by Richard Thorpe

- Directed by: Richard Thorpe
- Written by: Art Cohn
- Based on: "The Most Unforgettable Character I've Met"; 1951 Reader's Digest by Capt. H. T. Peoples
- Produced by: Armand Deutsch
- Starring: James Stewart; Jean Hagen; Wendell Corey
- Cinematography: William C. Mellor
- Edited by: Newell P. Kimlin
- Music by: Conrad Salinger
- Distributed by: Metro-Goldwyn-Mayer
- Release dates: May 7, 1952 (New York); May 16, 1952 (Los Angeles)
- Running time: 92 minutes
- Country: United States
- Language: English
- Budget: $1,111,000
- Box office: $2,589,000

Carbine Williams is a 1952 American drama film directed by Richard Thorpe and starring James Stewart, Jean Hagen and Wendell Corey. The film follows the life of its namesake, David Marshall Williams, who invented the operating principle for the M1 carbine gun while in a North Carolina prison. The carbine was used extensively by the U.S. military during World War II, the Korean War and the Vietnam War.

Originally filmed in black-and-white, the film has also been colorized.

== Plot ==
David Marshall "Marsh" Williams of the Winchester Repeating Arms Company company takes leave to tend to family matters. His embittered young son David has been teased in school and Marsh decides that the time has come to inform his son about his past. He takes David to a prison and leaves him with his friend Capt. H. T. Peoples, who tells David that Marsh had served time there for murder and describes the circumstances in a series of flashbacks.

Marsh is a young man who leaves the Navy after several hitches and returns home. His strict father and the family of his girlfriend Maggie believe Marsh to be irresponsible. Marsh marries Maggie and takes a laborious job with a railroad, where he is introduced to the illegal practice of distilling corn whiskey during the era of Prohibition. Marsh hides his new source of income from Maggie but she learns the truth when he is badly burned after a still explodes. She threatens to leave him if he will not quit the business. He promises to stop distilling moonshine but continues to expand the operation. When federal agents raid his operation, Marsh opens fire and escapes into the woods. Maggie finds Marsh and informs him that a federal agent had been killed in the gunfight. She convinces him to surrender and pledges that she will stand by him.

Marsh stands trial but the jury is deadlocked. He pleads guilty to second-degree murder to avoid a retrial and the possibility of a death sentence. The judge sentences him to 30 years in prison at hard labor. Maggie promises to wait for him.

In prison, a guard finds a knife on Marsh and he is ordered to work on a chain gang. The work is excruciating and the guards abuse the prisoners. The men are transferred to a different prison, where Marsh meets Peoples, the warden. Marsh refuses to communicate with his family. Peoples orders him to solitary confinement for insolence and Marsh remains there for 30 days, much longer than any man had previously endured.

Peoples grants Marsh 24 hours of leave and Marsh spends the day with Maggie. After returning, Marsh tells Peoples of his love of guns and shares his innovative design for an automatic rifle with a floating chamber. Marsh is allowed to work on his gun in the prison shop, but two other inmates steal it for a failed escape attempt. Marsh denies any complicity with the escape attempt and Peoples allows him to continue developing his concept. Peoples writes to Maggie to inform her of Marsh's progress with both the invention and his character.

Newspaper accounts report how Peoples has allowed an inmate to serve his time as a gunsmith, and the angry state prison commissioners hold a hearing. Peoples argues that he believes in Marsh's invention and vouches for him, offering to serve the remaining 22 years of Marsh's sentence himself if Marsh uses the gun to escape from prison. Marsh is allowed to demonstrate the carbine, which is an overwhelming success. A Winchester representative offers Marsh a job, and he is soon pardoned by the governor.

Back in the present day, Peoples tells David how his father holds 68 patents and developed the M1 carbine, which has changed the face of war. David tearfully reconciles with Marsh.

== Cast ==
- James Stewart as David Marshall "Marsh" Williams
- Jean Hagen as Maggie Williams
- Wendell Corey as Capt. H. T. Peoples
- Carl Benton Reid as Claude Williams
- Paul Stewart as Dutch Kruger
- Otto Hulett as Mobley
- Rhys Williams as Redwick Karson
- Herbert Heyes as Lionel Daniels
- James Arness as Leon Williams
- Porter Hall as Sam Markley
- Fay Roope as District Attorney
- Ralph Dumke as Andrew White
- Leif Erickson as Feder
- Henry Corden as Bill Stockton
- Frank Richards as Truex
- Howard Petrie as Sheriff
- Stuart Randall as Tom Vennar
- Dan Riss as Jesse Rimmer
- Bobby Hyatt as David Williams

== Production ==
The film is based on a story by Capt. H. T. Peoples titled "My Most Unforgettable Character" (misidentified in the film as "The Most Unforgettable Character I've Met") that was published in the March 1951 issue of Reader's Digest. MGM announced the film project in March 1951, with Marsh Williams hired as a technical adviser.

Production began in mid-December 1951 and wrapped by mid-January 1952.

== Reception ==
In a contemporary review for The New York Times, critic Bosley Crowther noted the plot's irony of freeing a man from a murder conviction because he has developed a weapon that will cause many more deaths, writing: "A certain degree of sentiment is aroused that may not be entirely supported when the elements are carefully analyzed. ... [T]he sympathy is loaded too heavily on the hero's side. His obvious indiscretions, not to mention his out-and-out crimes, are softened much too glibly with pity or comedy. If this is, indeed, the true story that it purports to be, it falls very neatly into the pattern of inspirational romance. Finally, there is the question of whether the invention of a gun is a humanitarian accomplishment worthy of the enthusiasm that is generously enjoined."

Critic Philip K. Scheuer of the Los Angeles Times wrote: "The clash of wills between warden and prisoner—and one's realization of the odd and interesting fact that this was how and where the modern light automatic rifle came into existence—constitutes the film's pertinent highlights. There's not too much else."

According to MGM records, the film earned $1,787,000 in the U.S. and Canada and $802,000 elsewhere, resulting in a profit of $575,000.

== Comic-book adaptation ==
- Fawcett Movie Comic #19 (October 1952)
