= Dr. Wayman C. Melvin House =

Historic house in North Carolina, United States

- U.S. National Register of Historic Places
- Location within North Carolina Location within the United States
- Location: 6386 NC 217, near Linden, North Carolina
- Coordinates: 35°16′01″N 78°44′26″W
- Area: 9.3 acres (3.8 ha)
- Built: c. 1890, 1902
- Architectural style: Queen Anne
- NRHP reference No.: 07001375
- Added to NRHP: January 9, 2008

Dr. Wayman C. Melvin House is a historic home located near Linden, Harnett County, North Carolina. It was built about 1890, and is a one-story Queen Anne style frame dwelling. It features a wraparound hipped-roof porch, shingled front-gable, and gable-front bay, all added in 1902. Also on the property are a contributing doctor's office (c. 1902) and cook's house/washhouse (c. 1902).

It was listed on the National Register of Historic Places in 2009.
