= Ivy Burne =

Historic farm in North Carolina, United States

- U.S. National Register of Historic Places
- U.S. Historic district
- Location within North Carolina Location within the United States
- Location: NC 217, E side 0.4 miles S of jct. with NC 2027, near Linden, North Carolina
- Coordinates: 35°15′57″N 78°44′03″W
- Area: 130 acres (53 ha)
- Built: 1872-1910
- Architectural style: Italianate, Queen Anne
- NRHP reference No.: 91001377
- Added to NRHP: September 5, 1991

Ivy Burne, also known as the John Murchison Hodges, Sr. House, is a historic home and farm complex and national historic district located near Linden, Harnett County, North Carolina. It encompasses eight contributing buildings and one contributing site on a rural farm complex.

The farmhouse was built in stages between 1872 and 1910, and is a two-story, vernacular Italianate / Queen Anne frame dwelling. It features a shallow, hip roofed front porch. Also on the property are a board-and-batten kitchen, a plank smokehouse, a log corn crib and tobacco barn and a frame generator house.

It was listed on the National Register of Historic Places in 1991.
