= Judson, Cumberland County, North Carolina =

Unincorporated community in North Carolina, US

Coordinates: 35°00′08″N 78°48′32″W

Judson
- Unincorporated community
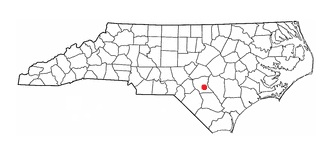
- Location of Judson within North Carolina
- Country: United States
- State: North Carolina
- County: Cumberland
- Time zone: UTC-5 (EST)
  - Summer (DST): UTC-4 (EDT)
- Area codes: 910, 472

Judson is an unincorporated community in Cumberland County, North Carolina, United States.
