= Averasboro Battlefield and Museum =

Civil war battlefield and museum in Dunn, North Carolina

Coordinates: 35°15′58″N 78°40′19″W

The Averasboro Battlefield and Museum is dedicated to the Battle of Averasborough, a Civil War battle fought on March 16, 1865. The museum, founded in 1994 by the Averasboro Battlefield Commission, Inc, is located on the battlefield in Dunn, North Carolina. The battlefield attained National Register Historic District status in May 2001. Also on the battlefield and considered to be part of the museum is the restored Chicora Civil Cemetery.

The Civil War Trust (a division of the American Battlefield Trust) and its partners have acquired and preserved 520 acres (2.1 km^{2}) of the battlefield.

== See also ==
- North Carolina Civil War Trails Program
