= Cape Fear Botanical Garden =

Botanical garden in Fayetteville, NC

Coordinates: 35.0542°N 78.8589°W

Cape Fear Botanical Garden (80 acres) is a nonprofit botanical garden located at 536 North Eastern Boulevard, Fayetteville, North Carolina. It is open to the public daily (excluding some holidays and in event of inclement weather); an admission fee is charged.

The Garden was established in 1989 to serve both Fayetteville Technical Community College horticulture students and North Carolina horticulturalists. It conserves and displays plant species and the plant communities of the Cape Fear River basin. The garden contains nature trails, a natural amphitheater, steep ravines with unusual plants, and a varied riparian terrain ranging from pine forest through hardwood hills to river banks. Cape Fear botanical gardens holds many events such as weddings, military balls, ceremonies, and business sessions.

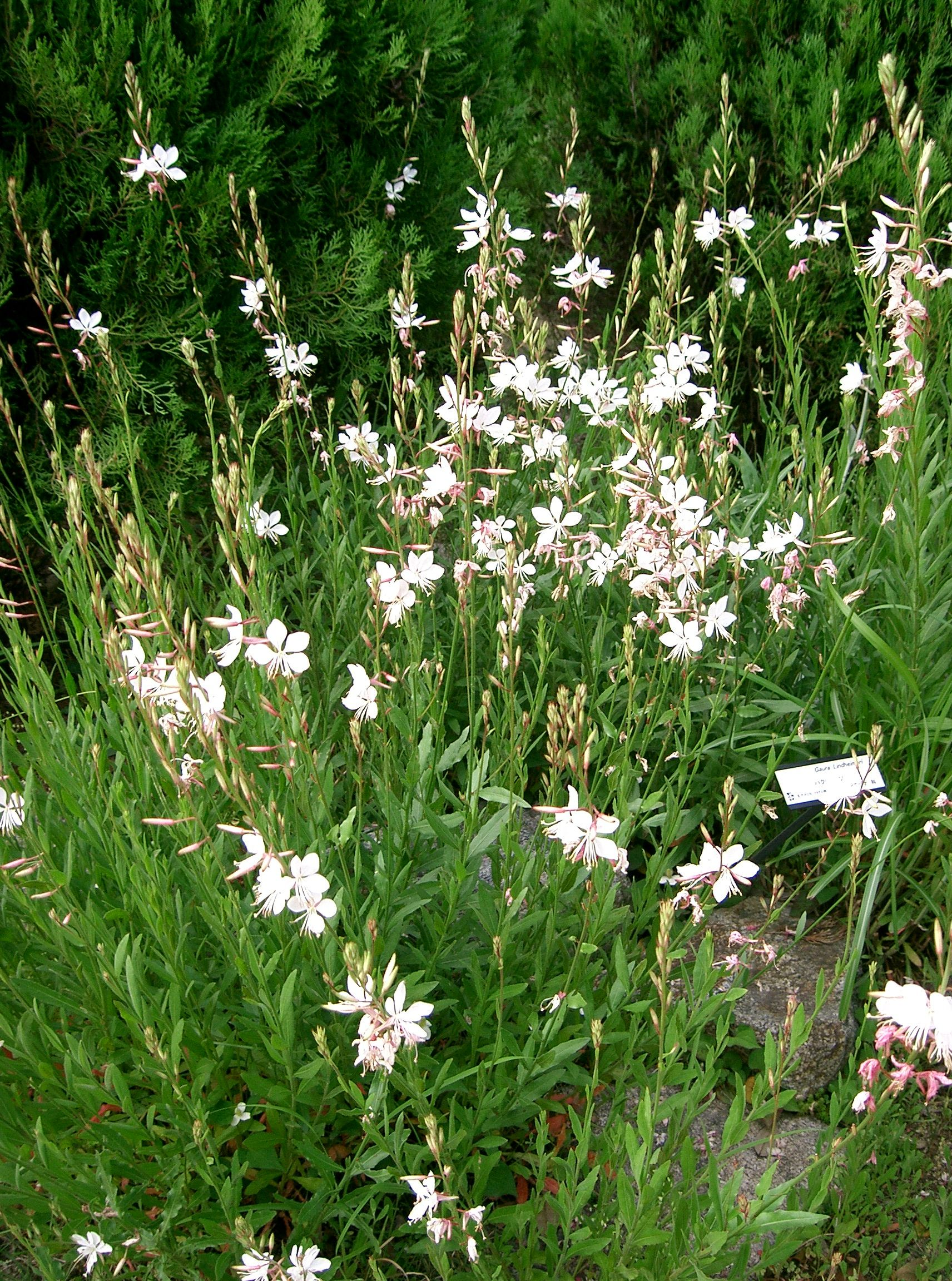

== See also ==
- List of botanical gardens in the United States
