= Harnett Regional Jetport =

Airport in North Carolina, US

- IATA: none; ICAO: KHRJ; FAA LID: HRJ

Summary
- Airport type: Public
- Owner: Harnett County
- Serves: Erwin, North Carolina
- Elevation AMSL: 202 ft (62 m)
- Coordinates: 35°22′49″N 078°43′56″W
- Interactive map of Harnett Regional Jetport

Runways
Direction	Length		Surface
Direction	ft	m	Surface
5/23	5,005	1,526	Asphalt

Statistics (2022)
- Aircraft operations (year ending 8/12/2022): 51,300
- Based aircraft: 38
- Source: Federal Aviation Administration

Harnett Regional Jetport (ICAO: KHRJ, FAA LID: HRJ) is a county-owned public-use airport in Harnett County, North Carolina, United States. The airport is located four nautical miles (7 km) northwest of the central business district of Erwin. It was formerly known as Harnett County Airport.

Although many U.S. airports use the same three-letter location identifier for the FAA and IATA, this facility is assigned HRJ by the FAA but has no designation from the IATA. The airport's ICAO identifier is KHRJ.

== Facilities and aircraft ==
Harnett Regional Jetport covers an area of 152 acres (62 ha) at an elevation of 202 feet (62 m) above mean sea level. It has one runway designated 5/23 with an asphalt surface measuring 5,005 by 75 feet (1,526 x 23 m).

For the 12-month period ending August 12, 2022, the airport had 51,300 aircraft operations, an average of 140 per day: 85% general aviation, 14% military, and <1% air taxi. At that time there were 38 aircraft based at this airport: 32 single-engine, 3 multi-engine, 1 jet, 1 helicopter, and 1 ultra-light.

== See also ==
- List of airports in North Carolina
