= Oak Grove (Erwin, North Carolina) =

Historic house in North Carolina, United States

- U.S. National Register of Historic Places
- Location within North Carolina Location within the United States
- Location: 8640 Burnett Rd, Dunn, NC 28334
- Coordinates: 35°15′0″N 78°41′25″W
- Area: 6 acres (2.4 ha)
- Built: c. 1764
- Architectural style: Georgian
- NRHP reference No.: 73001329
- Added to NRHP: February 6, 1973

Oak Grove is a historic home located near Erwin in Harnett County and Cumberland County, North Carolina. It was built about 1764, and is a two-story, five bay by two bay, Georgian frame dwelling. It has a full-width front porch and shed roofed wings. During the American Civil War, in March, 1865, the Battle of Averasborough was fought on the grounds of Oak Grove.

It was listed on the National Register of Historic Places in 1973.
