= Blackstone Military Academy =

Military school in Nottoway County, Virginia

Coordinates: 37.0709835°N 78.0047258°W

Blackstone Military Academy, a military school located in the town of Blackstone in Nottoway County, Virginia, was founded in 1912 and located off South Main Street in Blackstone itself. The exact coordinates of its former location are: Latitude: 37.0709835, Longitude: -78.0047258. These coordinates place it as having been to the immediate East of present-day Blackstone Army Airfield. The establishment of BMA occurred when Hodge Military Academy, a school that had been located on those same grounds since 1894, closed. BMA suffered a fire at one time in its history, but the school was rebuilt in 1922. BMA eventually closed, and the building that once served as the barracks for attending cadets functions today as the Clay's Rest Home.

"Blackstone Military Academy responded liberally to the subscriptions for the Soldiers' Library fund as well as to many other causes. Mrs. E. S. Ligon has the following to say of the work of the academy:

'Blackstone Military Academy was headquarters of the Nottoway Soldiers' Comfort League, and it was here that the members frequently met to wrap, address and send the sweaters to the Nottoway boys. On these occasions news of our boys was exchanged and letters read from those who had received the league's gifts. From the faculty and cadet corps of B. M. A. we furnished fifteen commissioned officers and twenty-seven noncommissioned officers, and at one time eighty-one percent of the total enrollment of the school faculty, cadets and alumni were in service. Three of the cadets lost their lives.' "

== Sources ==
- Directory of Military Schools US: defunct military schools
- Map of Virginia
- New River Notes: Virginia Communities in Wartime
