= Lebanon (Dunn, North Carolina) =

Historic house in North Carolina, United States

- U.S. National Register of Historic Places
- Location within North Carolina Location within the United States
- Location: 4.5 miles SW of Dunn on NC 82, near Dunn, North Carolina
- Coordinates: 35°15′35″N 78°40′17″W
- Area: 9 acres (3.6 ha)
- Built: c. 1824
- Architectural style: Greek Revival
- NRHP reference No.: 73001351
- Added to NRHP: January 29, 1973

Lebanon is a historic plantation house located near Dunn, Harnett County, North Carolina. It was built about 1824, and is a two-story, three-bay, Greek Revival style frame dwelling with a one-story wing. It is sheathed in weatherboard and rests on a brick foundation. The front facade features a three-bay, two-tier porch. During the American Civil War, the Battle of Averasboro (March 16, 1865) occurred in the immediate vicinity of plantation house and it was used as a hospital.

It was listed on the National Register of Historic Places in 1973.
