= Hay Street United Methodist Church =

Historic church in North Carolina, United States

- Hay Street Methodist Church
- U.S. National Register of Historic Places
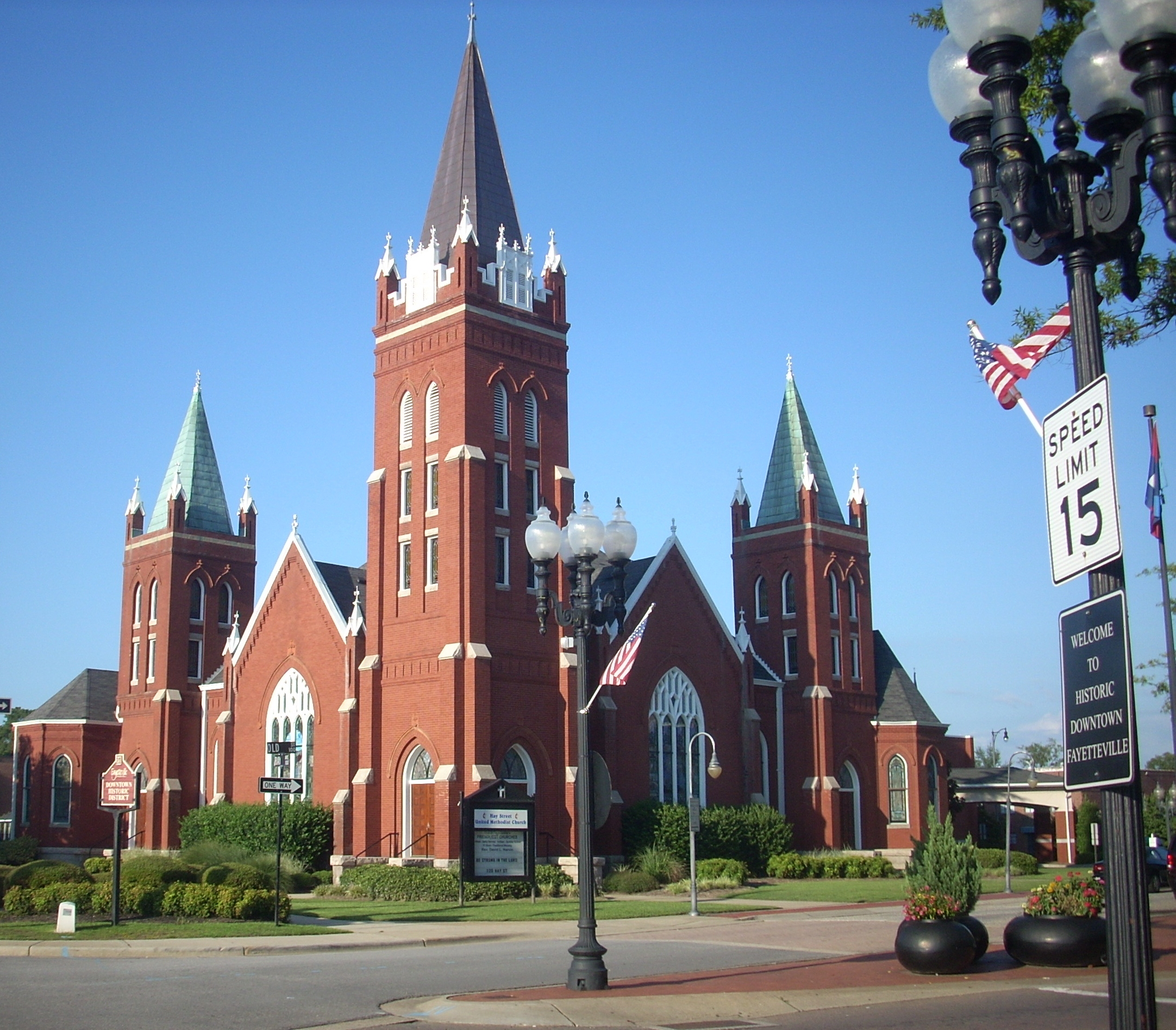
- Hay Street United Methodist Church

- Location within North Carolina Location within the United States
- Location: Hay St. at Ray and Old Sts., Fayetteville, North Carolina
- Coordinates: 35°3′11″N 78°52′27″W
- Area: 1.3 acres (0.53 ha)
- Built: 1907
- Architectural style: Late Gothic Revival
- MPS: Fayetteville MRA
- NRHP reference No.: 83001855
- Added to NRHP: July 7, 1983

Hay Street United Methodist Church is a historic Methodist church located in Fayetteville, Cumberland County, North Carolina. It was the first Methodist church constructed in the city.

The congregation was received into the Methodist Episcopal Church in 1808 by Bishop Francis Asbury and it was completed on June 23, 1835. The current structure was built in 1908, one hundred years after the official organization of the church. It is a brick church with three corner towers in the Late Gothic Revival style. The building is known for its elaborate stained glass windows, which feature the lost art of the "robing glass" technique. Renovations to the structure last took place in 1978, including the installation of a Holkamp Organ.

It was listed on the National Register of Historic Places in 1983.

The church constructed a new Family Life Center which was completed in 2007. The Rev. David Woodhouse currently serves as pastor.
