= Erwin, North Carolina =

Town in North Carolina, United States. Mayor of Erwin is Kayleigh Hensley

- Town
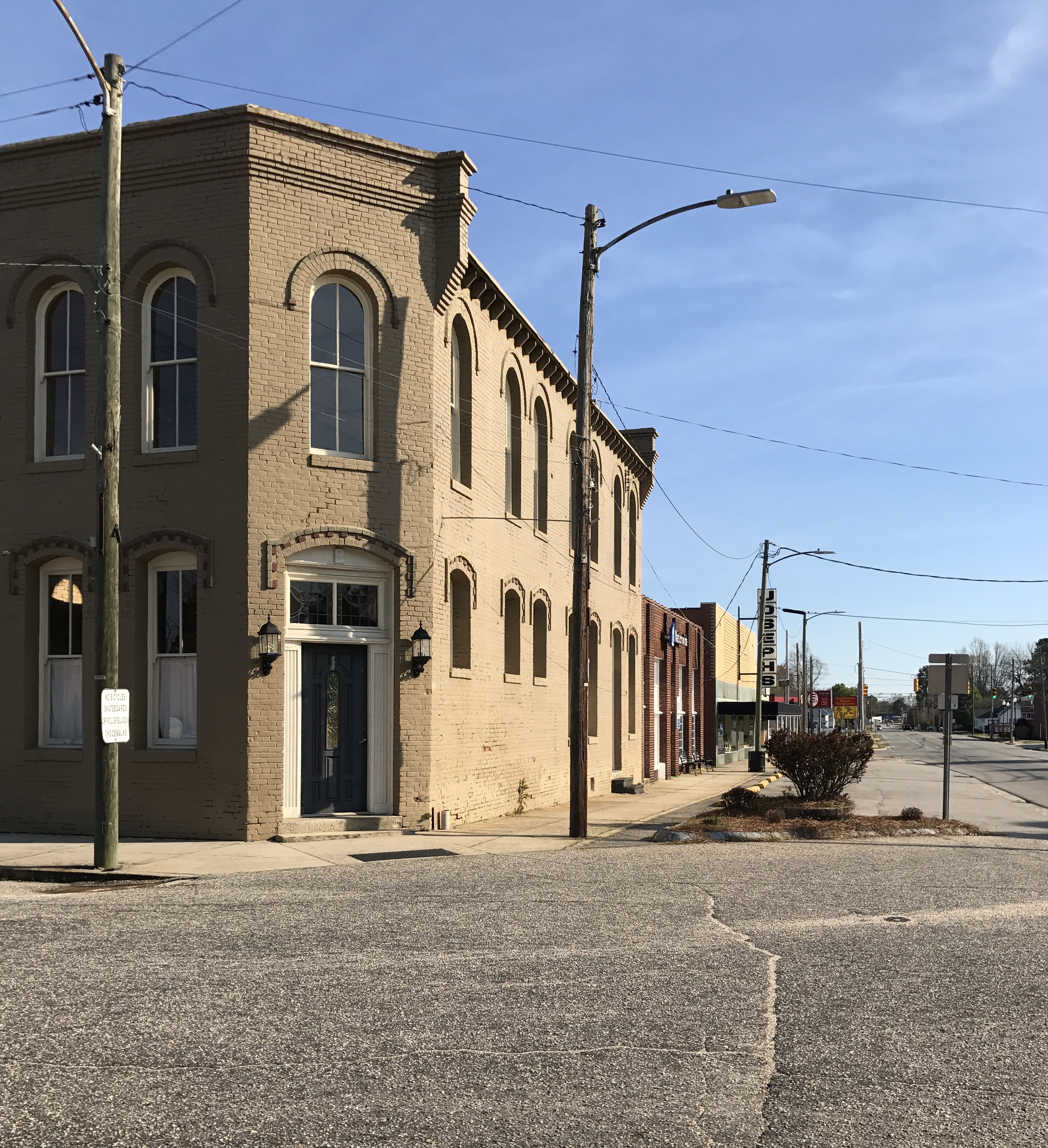
- Downtown Erwin

- Seal
- Motto: "Front Porch Friends"
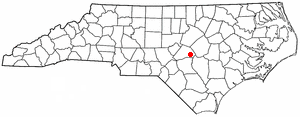
- Location of Erwin, North Carolina
- Coordinates: 35°19′21″N 78°40′24″W
- Country: United States
- State: North Carolina
- County: Harnett

Government
  - Mayor: Randy Baker

Area
  - Total: 4.25 sq mi (11.02 km^{2})
  - Land: 4.22 sq mi (10.92 km^{2})
  - Water: 0.039 sq mi (0.10 km^{2})
- Elevation: 194 ft (59 m)

Population (2020)
  - Total: 4,542
  - Density: 1,077.4/sq mi (415.98/km^{2})
- Time zone: UTC-5 (Eastern (EST))
  - Summer (DST): UTC-4 (EDT)
- ZIP Code: 28339
- Area codes: 910, 472
- FIPS code: 37-21740
- GNIS feature ID: 2406460
- Website: www.erwin-nc.org

Erwin is a town that is located in the eastern part of Harnett County, North Carolina, United States, located approximately 5 miles (8.0 km) from Dunn and approximately 20 miles (32 km) from Fayetteville. The city is a part of the Dunn, NC Micropolitan Statistical Area, which is additionally a part of the greater Raleigh-Durham-Cary, NC CSA, according to the United States Census Bureau. Currently, the city has a population of 5,270 as of the 2020 census. Its current mayor is Randy Baker, who has been the mayor since being elected on May 17, 2022.

== History ==
Prior to Erwin, there was a colonial-era settlement in the area known as "Averasboro". The Battle of Averasborough was fought nearby during the American Civil War. In 1902, the Duke family built the Erwin Cotton Mill, which closed on December 1, 2000, due to the North American Free Trade Agreement increasing the labor costs of the mill workers, leaving Swift Textiles to relocate the mill's operations to Mexico. The new town was named "Duke" after the founding shareholders. In 1925, the name was changed to "Erwin" because of the formation of Duke University in Durham, North Carolina. Oak Grove, Averasboro Battlefield Historic District, and Downtown Erwin are listed on the National Register of Historic Places.

On 12 July 2026 around 9 PM local time, a vehicle struck one of the transmission towers that serves the town, leaving the town without electricity service for the entire night, carrying into the next day. Duke Energy had to replace the pole with a temporary power pole that will serve until a new permanent tower is installed. No people were injured during the incident, as it was caused by weather.

== Geography ==
According to the United States Census Bureau, the town of Erwin has a total area of 4.23 square miles (10.95 km^{2}), of which 0.04 square miles (0.10 km^{2}), or 0.91%, are water. The Cape Fear River forms part of the western border of the town. Juniper Creek, a tributary to the Cape Fear River, enters in Erwin.

== Transportation ==
By road

US 421: The highway enters the city from the northwest, and continues into Dunn, North Carolina, where it meets with I-95, a major north–south highway across the East Coast.

NC 217: This short highway enters the city from the south, and its northern terminus is to the north of the city, where it intersects with US 421.

NC 82: This highway also enters the city from the south, and it meets with NC 217 through the center of Erwin, known as 13th Street. The highway, with NC 217, ends at US 421 in the northern part of the city.

By air

Harnett Regional Jetport is the only airport in the city, which is 10 miles near Buies Creek, NC. The airport currently does not support any airlines yet.

RDU Airport: Although not in the city, the airport serves the Triangle area, which includes Erwin.

By transit

There are no public transportation services that currently service the city.

Carpool services, such as Uber or Lyft are available 24 hours a day, seven days a week to and from the city.

== Education ==
=== Higher education ===
Campbell University

Central Carolina Community College

=== Public school ===
==== High school ====
Triton High School (North Carolina)

==== Middle school ====
Coats-Erwin Middle

==== Elementary school ====
Erwin Elementary: Merged with Gentry to form the new Erwin Elementary, which opened on April 18, 2022.

== Demographics ==
Historical population
Census	Pop.	Note	%±
1950	3,344		—
1960	3,183		−4.8%
1970	2,852		−10.4%
1980	2,828		−0.8%
1990	4,061		43.6%
2000	4,537		11.7%
2010	4,405		−2.9%
2020	4,542		3.1%
U.S. Decennial Census

=== 2020 census ===
Erwin racial composition
Race	Number	Percentage
White (non-Hispanic)	2,900	63.85%
Black or African American (non-Hispanic)	794	17.48%
Native American	28	0.62%
Asian	9	0.2%
Pacific Islander	6	0.13%
Other/Mixed	193	4.25%
Hispanic or Latino	612	13.47%

As of the 2020 United States census, there were 4,542 people, 1,890 households, and 1,254 families residing in the town.

=== 2000 census ===
As of the census of 2000, there were 4,537 people, 1,896 households, and 1,287 families residing in the town. The population density was 1,128.8 inhabitants per square mile (435.8/km^{2}). There were 2,032 housing units at an average density of 505.6 per square mile (195.2/km^{2}). The racial makeup of the town was 80.63% White, 15.96% African American, 0.55% Native American, 0.09% Asian, 1.79% from other races, and 0.99% from two or more races. Hispanic or Latino of any race were 4.14% of the population.

There were 1,896 households, out of which 29.2% had children under the age of 18 living with them, 50.9% were married couples living together, 12.5% had a female householder with no husband present, and 32.1% were non-families. Of all households, 28.3% were made up of individuals, and 14.9% had someone living alone who was 65 years of age or older. The average household size was 2.38 and the average family size was 2.90.

In the town, the population was spread out, with 23.7% under the age of 18, 6.9% from 18 to 24, 27.9% from 25 to 44, 23.5% from 45 to 64, and 17.9% who were 65 years of age or older. The median age was 39 years. For every 100 females, there were 90.9 males. For every 100 females age 18 and over, there were 89.0 males.

The median income for a household in the town was $29,521, and the median income for a family was $41,270. Males had a median income of $29,610 versus $22,650 for females. The per capita income for the town was $18,282. About 16.4% of families and 20.7% of the population were below the poverty line, including 22.2% of those under age 18 and 31.3% of those age 65 or over.

Erwin currently has two schools: Erwin Elementary and Triton High School.

== Water tower ==
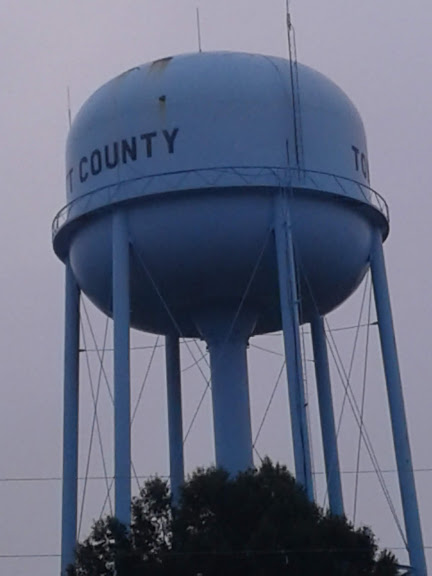
Water tower that was taken near West C Street.

In early 2012, Erwin became home to the tallest sphere-topped water tower. The 219.75-foot (66.98 m) structure is about eight feet (2.4 m) taller than the previous record holder, the Union Watersphere in Union, New Jersey. However, photographs of the Erwin water tower revealed the new tower to be a water spheroid, not an actual water sphere (pictured).

== Notable people ==
- Al Woodall, NFL quarterback
