= Battle of Averasborough =

Battle of the American Civil War

Coordinates: 35.26618°N 78.67222°W

- Part of the American Civil War
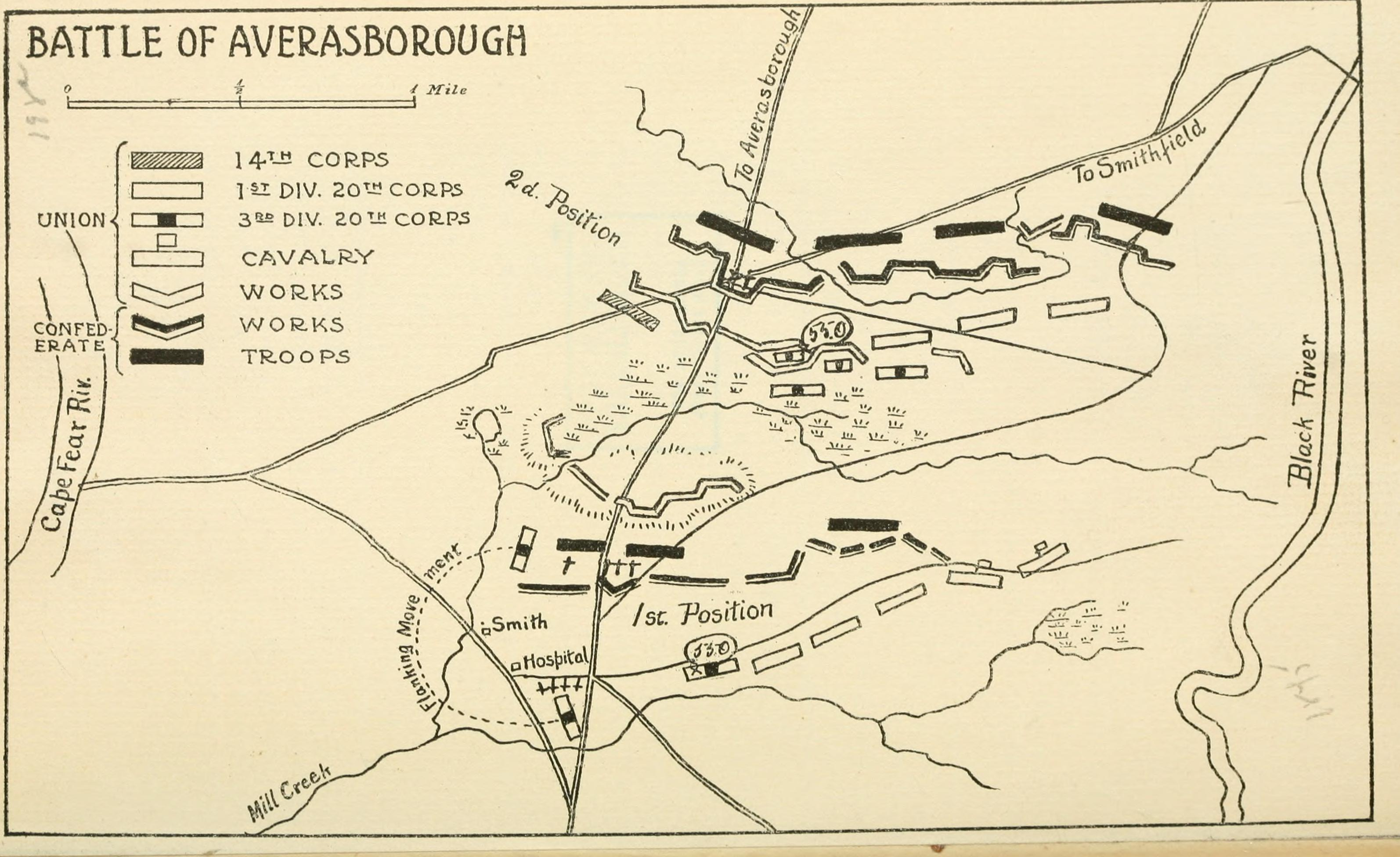
- Map of the Battle of Averasborough
Date	March 16, 1865
Location	Harnett and Cumberland counties, North Carolina
Result	Inconclusive

Belligerents
United States (Union)	Confederate States

Commanders and leaders
(United States) William T. Sherman	(Confederate States of America) William J. Hardee

Units involved
Army of Georgia	Hardee's Corps

Strength
12,000	7,000

Casualties and losses
700	500
- Location within North Carolina

The Battle of Averasborough fought March 16, 1865, in Harnett and Cumberland counties, North Carolina, as part of the Carolinas campaign of the American Civil War, was a prelude to the climactic Battle of Bentonville, which began three days later.

== Opposing forces ==
=== Union ===
Union Maj. Gen. William T. Sherman was moving his army north towards Goldsboro in two columns. The right column (Army of the Tennessee) was under the command of Maj. Gen. Oliver O. Howard and the left column (Army of Georgia) was under Maj. Gen. Henry W. Slocum.

=== Confederate ===
Confederate Gen. Joseph E. Johnston sent Lt. Gen. William J. Hardee's corps to attack Slocum's left wing while it was separated from the rest of Sherman's forces.

== Battle ==
Slocum's troops had crossed the Cape Fear River at Fayetteville and were marching up the Raleigh plank road. Near Averasborough, they encountered Hardee's corps. On the morning of March 16, troops of the Union XX Corps under Maj. Gen. Alpheus S. Williams were driven back by a Confederate assault. When reinforcements arrived, the Union forces counterattacked and drove back two lines of Confederates, but were stopped by a third line. By this time, units from Maj. Gen. Jefferson C. Davis's XIV Corps began to arrive on the field. Outnumbered and in danger of being flanked, Hardee's troops withdrew.

== Battlefield preservation ==
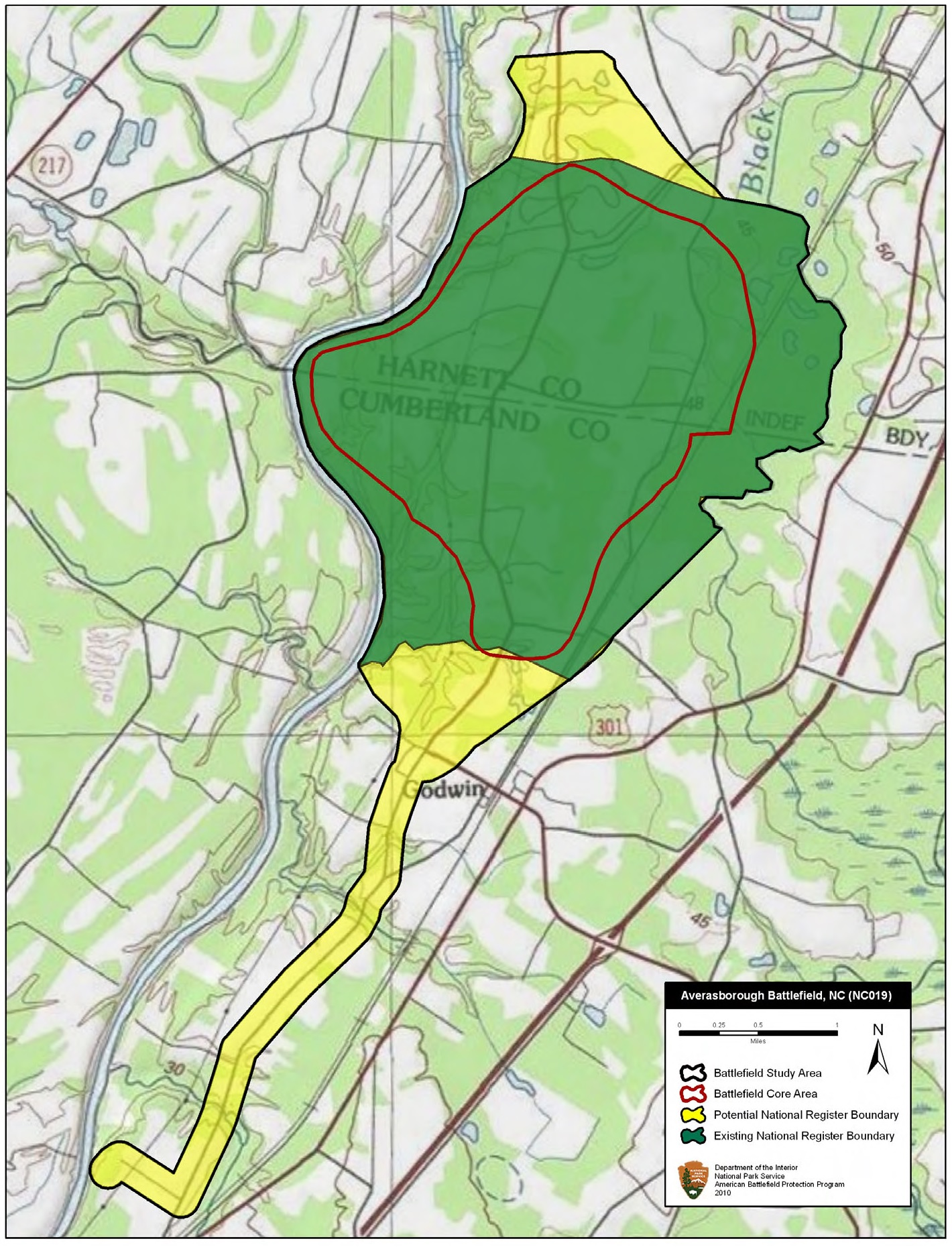
Map by the American Battlefield Protection Program

The Battle of Averasborough was fought on the grounds of Oak Grove, a former plantation of the John Smith family near Erwin, North Carolina. Lebanon was used as a hospital. Prior to the battle, Union soldiers raided the Ellerslie Plantation for supplies and quartered troops in the plantation's main house. The Averasboro Battlefield Historic District was listed on the National Register of Historic Places in 2001. The American Battlefield Trust and its partners have acquired and preserved more than 568 acres (2.30 km^{2}) of the Averasborough battlefield as of mid-2023.
