= Cumberland County, North Carolina =

County in North Carolina, United States

- County
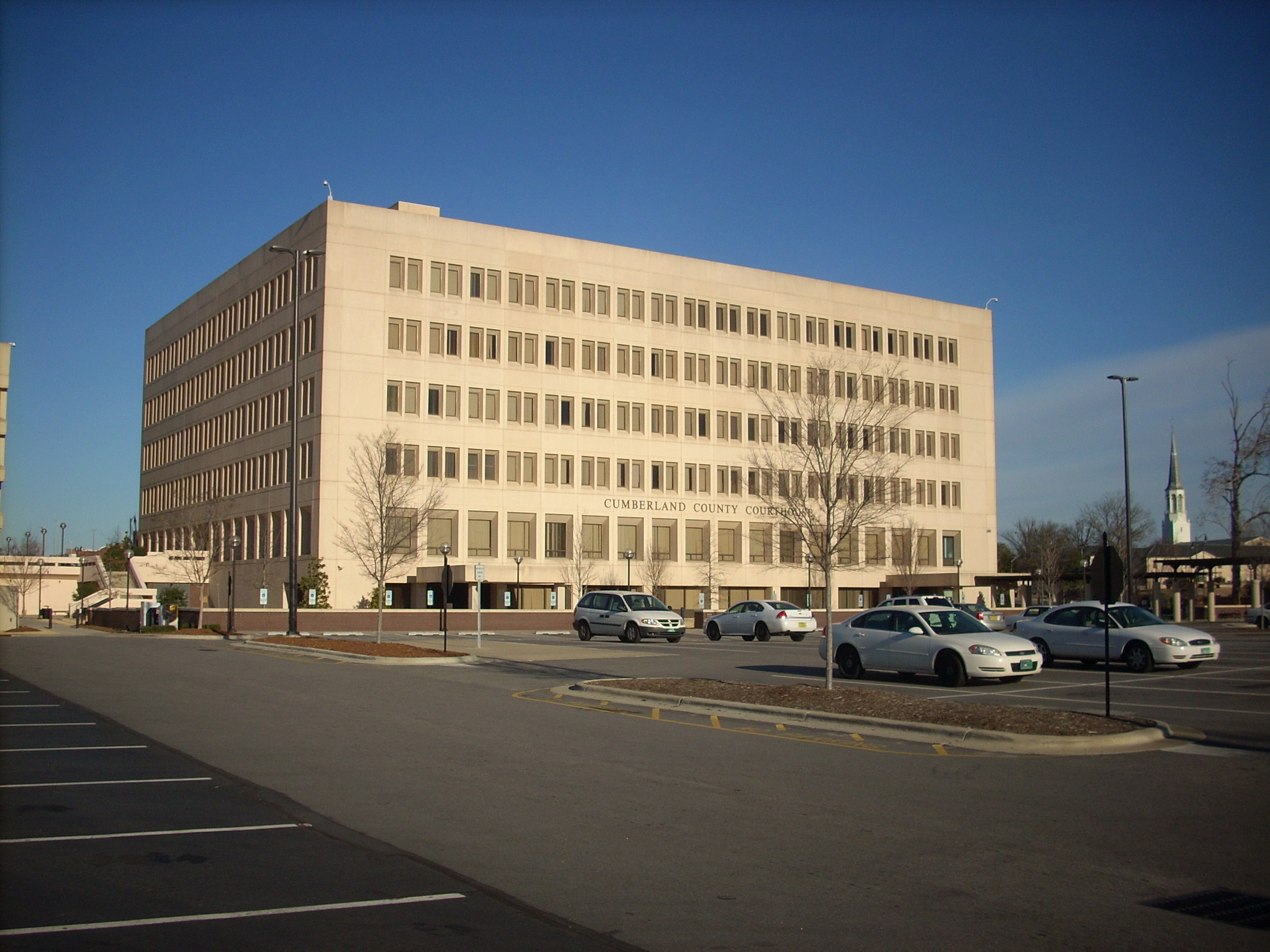
- Cumberland County Courthouse in Fayetteville

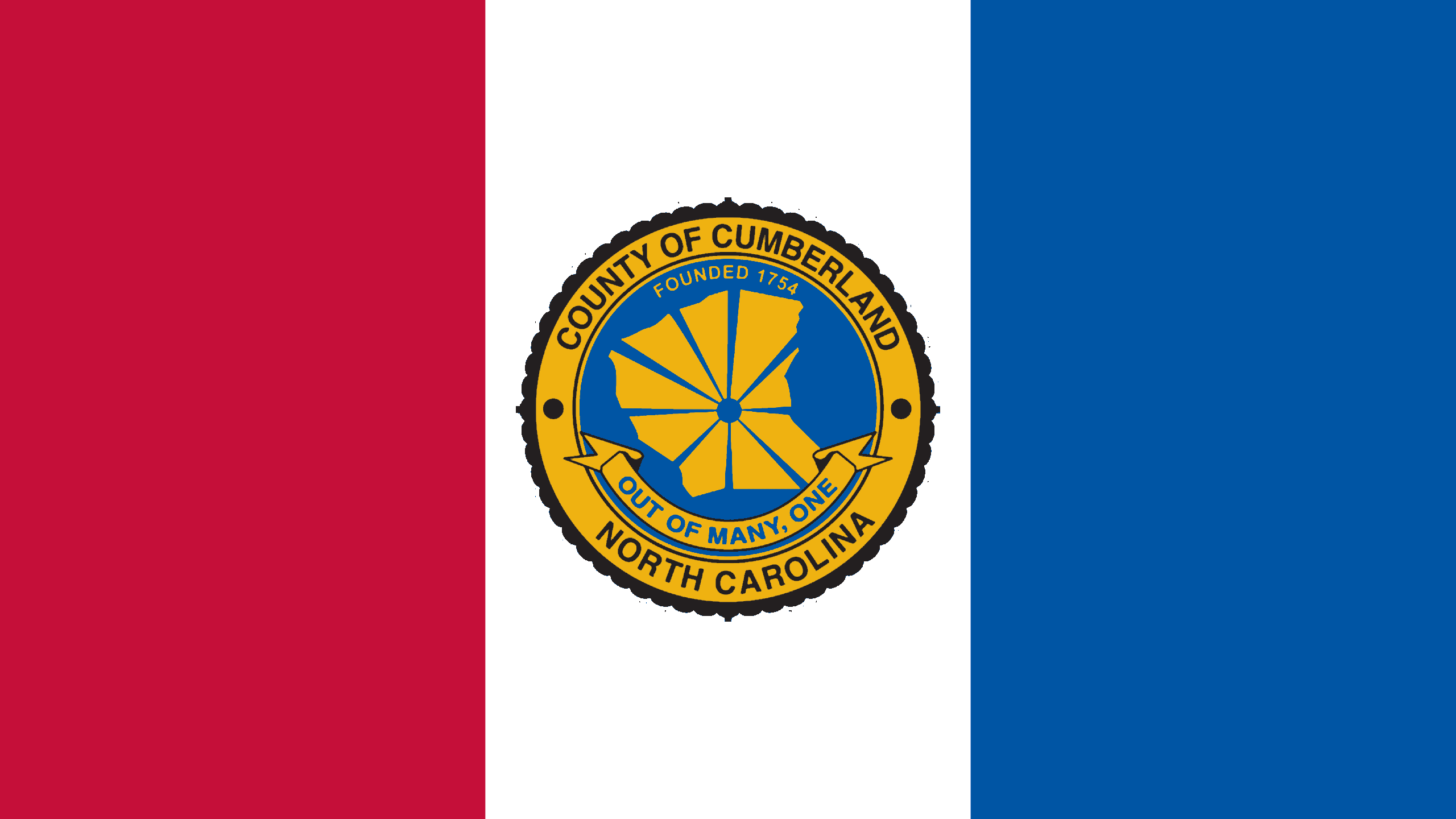
- Flag Seal Logo
- Motto(s): "Out Of Many, One"
- Location within the U.S. state of North Carolina
- Interactive map of Cumberland County, North Carolina
- Coordinates: 35.05°N 78.83°W
- Country: United States
- State: North Carolina
- Founded: 1754
- Named for: Prince William, Duke of Cumberland
- Seat: Fayetteville
- Largest community: Fayetteville

Area
  - Total: 658.48 sq mi (1,705.5 km^{2})
  - Land: 652.56 sq mi (1,690.1 km^{2})
  - Water: 5.92 sq mi (15.3 km^{2}) 0.90%

Population (2020)
  - Total: 334,728
  - Estimate (2025): 338,473 ▲
  - Density: 513.4/sq mi (198.2/km^{2})
- Time zone: UTC−5 (Eastern)
  - Summer (DST): UTC−4 (EDT)
- Congressional districts: 7th, 9th
- Website: www.cumberlandcountync.gov

Cumberland County is a county located in the U.S. state of North Carolina. As of the 2020 census, the population was 334,728, making it the fifth-most populous county in North Carolina. Its county seat is Fayetteville. Cumberland County is part of the Fayetteville, NC Metropolitan Statistical Area.

== History ==
The county was formed in 1754 from Bladen County. It was named for Prince William Augustus, Duke of Cumberland (1721–1765), captain-general of the British army and victorious commander at the Battle of Culloden.

In 1771 parts of Cumberland County, Johnston County, and Orange County were combined to form Wake County. In July 1784 the western part of Cumberland County became Moore County; the eastern part became Fayette County in honor of the Marquis de la Fayette, but the name Cumberland County was restored three months later. The county was represented as Fayette County in the North Carolina General Assembly of April 1784. In 1855 the northern part of Cumberland County became Harnett County. Finally, in 1911 parts of Cumberland County and Robeson County were combined to form Hoke County.

== Geography ==
According to the U.S. Census Bureau, the county has a total area of 658.48 square miles (1,705.5 km^{2}), of which 652.56 square miles (1,690.1 km^{2}) is land and 5.92 square miles (15.3 km^{2}) (0.90%) is water.

=== State and local protected areas/sites ===
- Bushy Lake State Natural Area
- Carvers Creek State Park
- Museum of the Cape Fear Historical Complex
- Oak Grove Plantation
- Old Linden School
- Rhodes Pond Game Land (part)
- Suggs Mill Pond Game Land (part)
- Taliaferro's Division Monument
- William T. Smith House

=== Major water bodies ===
- Cape Fear River
- Carvers Creek
- Cross Creek
- Hope Mills Lake
- Little River
- Mingo Swamp
- Rockfish Creek
- South River

=== Adjacent counties ===
- Harnett County – north
- Sampson County – east
- Bladen County – south
- Robeson County – southwest
- Hoke County – west
- Moore County – west

=== Major highways ===
- I-95
- I-95 BL
- I-295 /
- US 13
- US 301
- US 401
- US 401 Bus.
- NC 24
- NC 53
- NC 59
- NC 82
- NC 87
- NC 162
- NC 210
- NC 217
- NC 242
- NC 295 (temporary highway designation for I-295)
- NC 690

=== Major infrastructure ===
- Fayetteville Regional Airport
- Fayetteville Station
- Fort Bragg (part)
- Pope Army Airfield
- Simmons Army Airfield, military airfield

== Demographics ==
Historical population
Census	Pop.	Note	%±
1790	8,730		—
1800	9,264		6.1%
1810	9,382		1.3%
1820	14,446		54.0%
1830	14,834		2.7%
1840	15,284		3.0%
1850	20,610		34.8%
1860	16,369		−20.6%
1870	17,035		4.1%
1880	23,836		39.9%
1890	27,321		14.6%
1900	29,249		7.1%
1910	35,284		20.6%
1920	35,064		−0.6%
1930	45,219		29.0%
1940	59,320		31.2%
1950	96,006		61.8%
1960	148,418		54.6%
1970	212,042		42.9%
1980	247,160		16.6%
1990	274,566		11.1%
2000	302,963		10.3%
2010	319,431		5.4%
2020	334,728		4.8%
2025 (est.)	338,473	▲	1.1%
U.S. Decennial Census; 1790–1960 1900–1990; 1990–2000 2010 2020

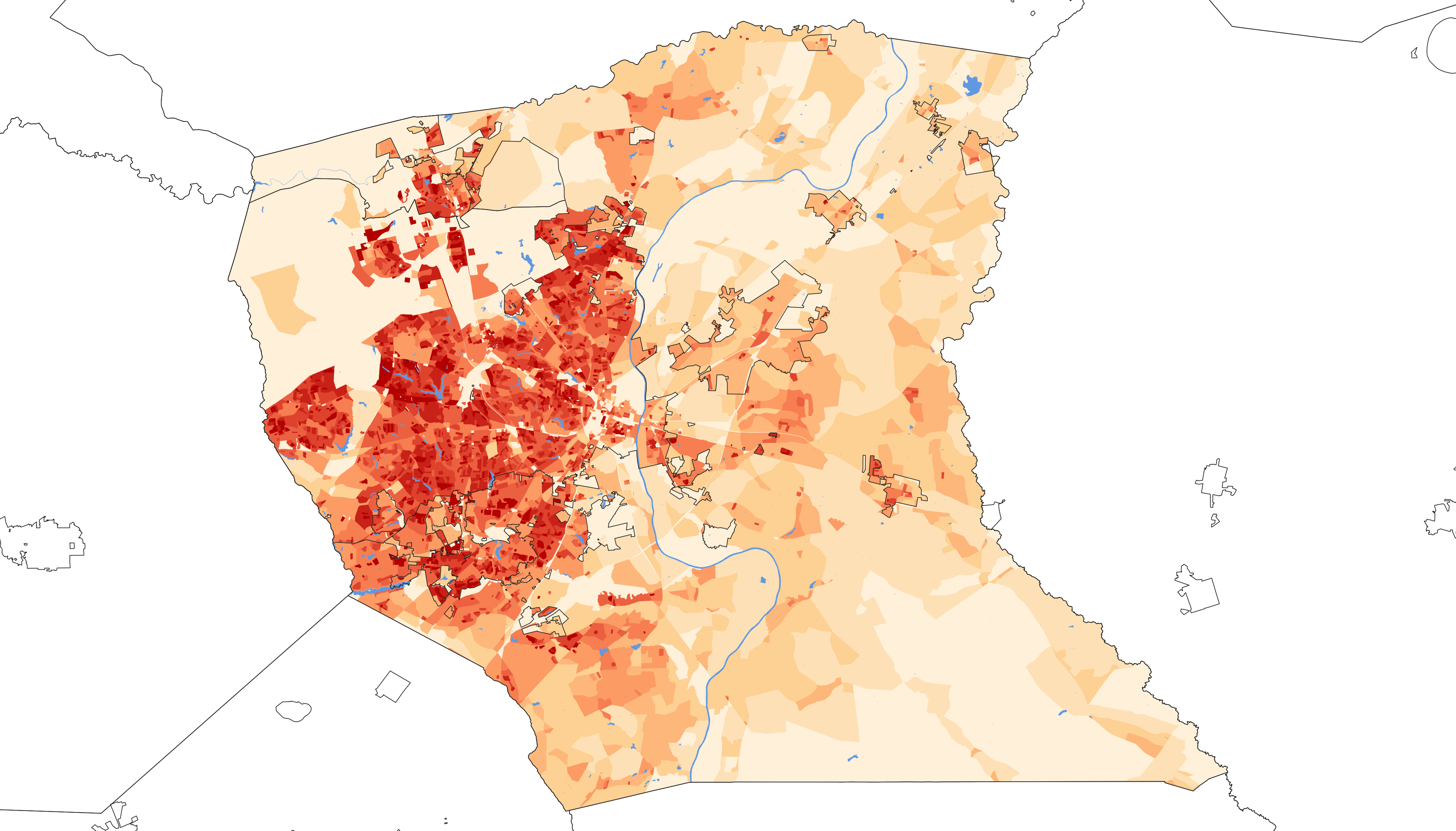
2020 population density of Cumberland County NC by census block

=== 2020 census ===
As of the 2020 census, there were 334,728 people, 128,978 households, and 78,365 families residing in the county.

The median age was 33.4 years; 24.0% of residents were under the age of 18 and 13.0% were 65 years of age or older. For every 100 females there were 94.9 males, and for every 100 females age 18 and over there were 92.3 males age 18 and over.

The racial makeup of the county was 42.4% White, 38.1% Black or African American, 1.7% American Indian and Alaska Native, 2.7% Asian, 0.4% Native Hawaiian and Pacific Islander, 4.7% from some other race, and 9.9% from two or more races. Hispanic or Latino residents of any race comprised 11.8% of the population.

86.2% of residents lived in urban areas, while 13.8% lived in rural areas.

There were 128,978 households in the county, of which 33.5% had children under the age of 18 living in them. Of all households, 41.8% were married-couple households, 18.8% were households with a male householder and no spouse or partner present, and 33.4% were households with a female householder and no spouse or partner present. About 28.6% of all households were made up of individuals and 9.4% had someone living alone who was 65 years of age or older.

There were 142,175 housing units, of which 9.3% were vacant. Among occupied housing units, 53.4% were owner-occupied and 46.6% were renter-occupied. The homeowner vacancy rate was 2.5% and the rental vacancy rate was 8.5%.

=== Racial and ethnic composition ===
Cumberland County, North Carolina – Racial and ethnic composition Note: the US Census treats Hispanic/Latino as an ethnic category. This table excludes Latinos from the racial categories and assigns them to a separate category. Hispanics/Latinos may be of any race.
Race / Ethnicity (NH = Non-Hispanic)	Pop 1980	Pop 1990	Pop 2000	Pop 2010	Pop 2020	% 1980	% 1990	% 2000	% 2010	% 2020
White alone (NH)	154,639	165,057	159,304	150,749	133,201	62.57%	60.12%	52.58%	47.19%	39.79%
Black or African American alone (NH)	74,800	86,216	104,068	113,939	124,173	30.26%	31.40%	34.35%	35.67%	37.10%
Native American or Alaska Native alone (NH)	3,660	4,208	4,371	4,655	4,647	1.48%	1.53%	1.44%	1.46%	1.39%
Asian alone (NH)	4,042	5,488	5,552	6,885	8,943	1.64%	2.00%	1.83%	2.16%	2.67%
Native Hawaiian or Pacific Islander alone (NH)	x	x	839	1,114	1,357	x	x	0.28%	0.35%	0.41%
Other race alone (NH)	899	299	735	671	2,206	0.36%	0.11%	0.24%	0.21%	0.66%
Mixed race or Multiracial (NH)	x	x	7,175	11,228	20,703	x	x	2.37%	3.52%	6.19%
Hispanic or Latino (any race)	9,120	13,298	20,919	30,190	39,498	3.69%	4.84%	6.90%	9.45%	11.80%
Total	247,160	274,566	302,963	319,431	334,728	100.00%	100.00%	100.00%	100.00%	100.00%

=== 2010 census ===
At the 2010 census, 302,963 people, 107,358 households, and 77,619 families resided in the county. The population density was 464 people per square mile (179 people/km^{2}). The 118,425 housing units had an average density of 181 units per square mile (70 units/km^{2}). The racial makeup of the county was 55.15% White, 34.90% African American, 1.55% Native American, 1.88% Asian, 0.30% Pacific Islander, 3.13% from other races, and 3.09% from two or more races. About 6.90% of the population were Hispanics or Latinos of any race.

Of the 107,358 households, 39.4% had children under 18 living with them, 52.9% were married couples living together, 15.5% had a female householder with no husband present, and 27.7% were not families. About 22.4% of all households were made up of individuals, and 5.9% had someone living alone who was 65 or older. The average household size was 2.65, and the average family size was 3.11.

In the county, the age distribution was 27.9% under 18, 13.7% from 18 to 24, 32.9% from 25 to 44, 17.8% from 45 to 64, and 7.7% who were 65 or older. The median age was 30.0 years. For every 100 females, there were 102.30 males. For every 100 females 18 and over, there were 101.90 males.

The median income for a household in the county was $37,466, and for a family was $41,459. Males had a median income of $28,308 versus $22,379 for females. The per capita income for the county was $17,376. About 10.4% of families and 12.8% of the population were below the poverty line, including 16.8% of those under age 18 and 13.70% of those 65 or over.

== Government and politics ==
Cumberland County is a member of the regional Mid-Carolina Council of Governments.

United States presidential election results for Cumberland County, North Carolina
Year	Republican		Democratic		Third party(ies)	
Year	No.	%	No.	%	No.	%
1880	2,137	50.33%	2,109	49.67%	0	0.00%
1884	2,192	47.03%	2,469	52.97%	0	0.00%
1888	2,028	44.56%	2,523	55.44%	0	0.00%
1892	1,333	27.17%	2,178	44.39%	1,395	28.43%
1896	2,200	46.36%	2,509	52.88%	36	0.76%
1900	2,138	51.98%	1,964	47.75%	11	0.27%
1904	1,129	41.37%	1,594	58.41%	6	0.22%
1908	1,453	44.23%	1,832	55.77%	0	0.00%
1912	235	8.41%	1,678	60.08%	880	31.51%
1916	1,217	38.17%	1,971	61.83%	0	0.00%
1920	1,972	37.89%	3,233	62.11%	0	0.00%
1924	1,372	31.67%	2,923	67.47%	37	0.85%
1928	3,534	51.73%	3,297	48.27%	0	0.00%
1932	931	15.56%	5,012	83.77%	40	0.67%
1936	1,024	13.60%	6,505	86.40%	0	0.00%
1940	1,118	15.60%	6,050	84.40%	0	0.00%
1944	2,014	23.34%	6,615	76.66%	0	0.00%
1948	1,741	19.21%	4,996	55.13%	2,325	25.66%
1952	7,474	45.82%	8,839	54.18%	0	0.00%
1956	6,699	43.05%	8,862	56.95%	0	0.00%
1960	8,072	41.03%	11,601	58.97%	0	0.00%
1964	9,093	39.61%	13,864	60.39%	0	0.00%
1968	9,143	31.95%	9,938	34.72%	9,539	33.33%
1972	24,376	70.46%	9,853	28.48%	366	1.06%
1976	14,226	36.78%	24,297	62.81%	160	0.41%
1980	21,540	47.63%	22,073	48.80%	1,615	3.57%
1984	31,602	58.18%	22,614	41.63%	103	0.19%
1988	27,057	53.07%	23,789	46.66%	133	0.26%
1992	27,139	42.10%	30,291	46.98%	7,040	10.92%
1996	29,804	44.83%	32,739	49.25%	3,936	5.92%
2000	38,129	49.42%	38,626	50.07%	396	0.51%
2004	49,139	51.60%	45,788	48.08%	299	0.31%
2008	52,151	40.88%	74,693	58.55%	731	0.57%
2012	50,666	39.69%	75,792	59.38%	1,183	0.93%
2016	51,265	40.21%	71,605	56.16%	4,636	3.64%
2020	60,032	40.80%	84,469	57.40%	2,649	1.80%
2024	59,840	42.59%	78,631	55.96%	2,042	1.45%

== Education ==
Cumberland County is home to Fayetteville State University (an HBCU in the CIAA Conference), Methodist University (a member of the USA South Athletic Conference), and Fayetteville Technical Community College.

The Cumberland County Schools district serves most areas for grades PK-12. The Department of Defense Education Activity (DoDEA) operates public schools on Fort Bragg for PK-8, but for high school Fort Bragg students attend local public schools in their respective counties. The Cumberland Schools system is the fourth largest public school system in the state of North Carolina. There are 17 high schools in Cumberland County: Cape Fear, Cross Creek Early College, Cumberland International Early College, Cumberland Academy 6-12, Douglas Byrd, E.E. Smith, Gray's Creek, Jack Britt, Massey Hill Classical, Pine Forest, Reid Ross Classical, Seventy-First, South View, Terry Sanford, Alger B. Wilkins, Ramsey Street, and Westover.

=== Cumberland County Public Library and Information Center ===
The Cumberland County Public Library & and Information Center began as the Fayetteville Library Society after being incorporated by the North Carolina General Assembly in 1794. The Fayetteville Library Society was the first library organization or group to become incorporated in the state of North Carolina. The current library director is Ms. Jody Risacher and she is also a member of the 2018 Library Board of Trustees for Cumberland County. Board of trustee members are appointed every three years by the Cumberland County Board of Commissioners.

Director Risacher was initially hired as the deputy director for the Cumberland County Public Library and Information Center in the late 1990s and became the library's director in 2008. Director Risacher was named the Library Director of the Year by the North Carolina Public Library Association in 2013.

Cumberland County Public Library and Information Center has eight branches: Bordeaux Branch, Cliffdale Regional Branch, East Regional Branch, Headquarters Branch, Hope Mills Branch, North Regional Branch, Spring Lake Branch, and West Regional Branch. The newest branch is the West Regional Branch Library which opened in 2010, and the oldest branch was the Gillespie Street Branch, which originated as the James Walker Hood Library in 1942 and was a branch specifically for African Americans. Its mission statement is “The library opens windows to the world by encouraging expression, enlightenment, and exploration”.

In 2012, the Cumberland County Public Library and Information Center received the National Medal for Museum and Library Service, which is only awarded to five libraries in the United States each year.

In 2018, the Cumberland County Public Library and Information Center won two grants via the American Library Association and the Arts Council of Cumberland County for a total of $5,300.00. One grant was used to support a pilot program at a local high school and the other to support the Cumberland County Storytelling Festival and Artrepreneur program.

The Cumberland County Court Library, which was previously located in the Judge E. Maurice Braswell Courthouse, moved to the Headquarters Library in February 2018. The Court Library is now situated in the Local and State History Room and collection materials are now available to the general public via local libraries. Library staff is available to assist patrons with finding information but they cannot offer patrons legal advice.

Some of the current services offered by the branch libraries include children's, young adult, and adult programming, genealogy and local history, homeschooling resources, and homework help for students. Cumberland County Public Library & Information Center offers patrons access to free downloads for audiobooks, ebooks, magazines, videos, and resources for education purposes. Patrons are able to access these resources remotely online via the use of the patron's library card number and pin. The library branches also offer computer training courses/classes, as well as story times, and opportunities for people or groups in the community to reserve spaces for meetings and programs.

== Arts & Culture ==
An October 2023 study released by Americans for the Arts, (AFTA) found that nonprofit arts and culture organizations in Fayetteville and Cumberland County created $72.2 million in total economic activity in 2022, supported over 1100 jobs, provided $44.1 million in personal income to residents and generated $9.5 million in local, state and federal tax revenue. At an April 2024 event the Arts Council of Fayetteville/Cumberland County announced that arts and cultural activities drew more than 900,000 visitors to the region.

=== Points of interest ===
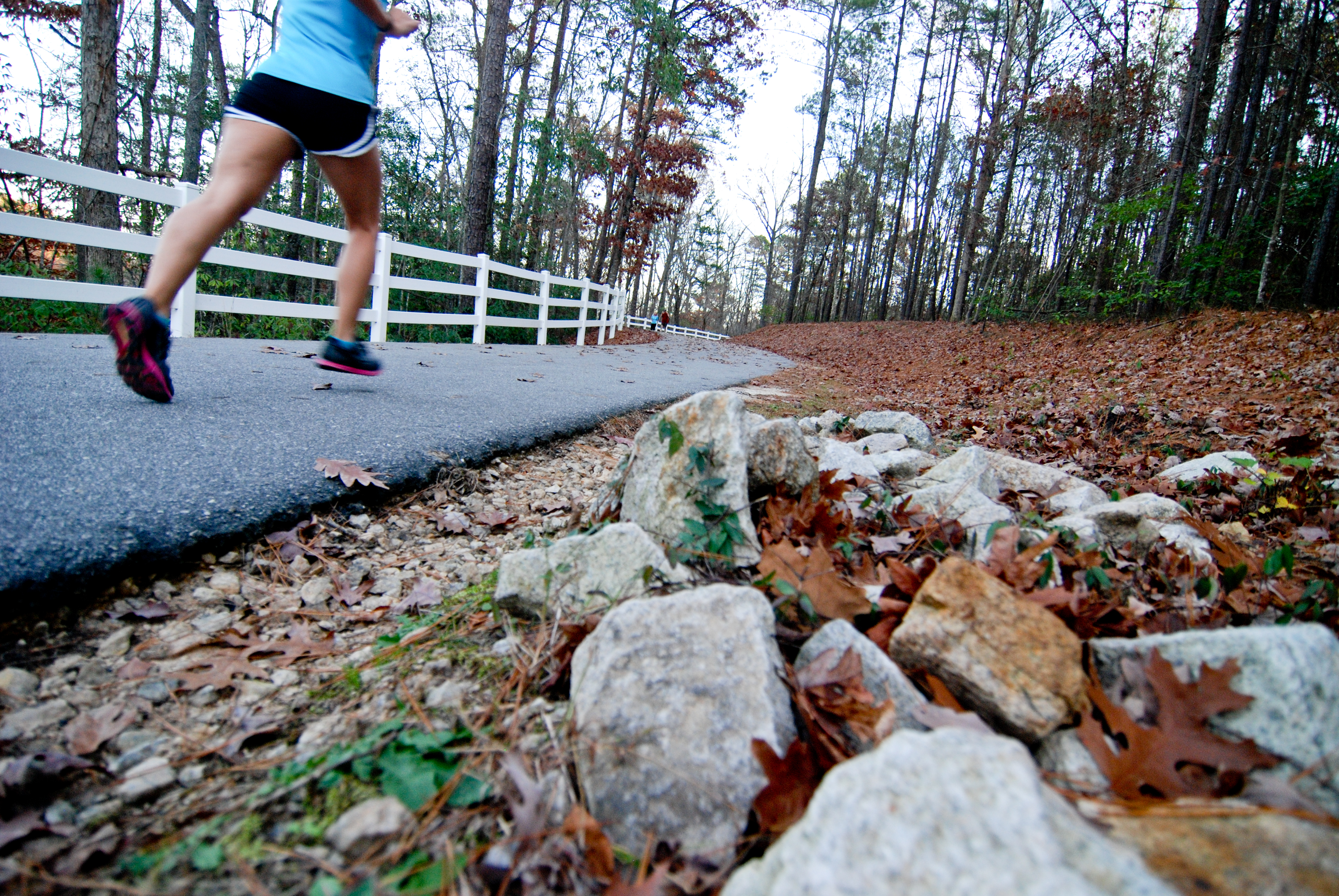
The Cape Fear River Trail is designated as part of the East Coast Greenway, a series of urban trails and greenways that will eventually connect from Maine to Key West, Florida.

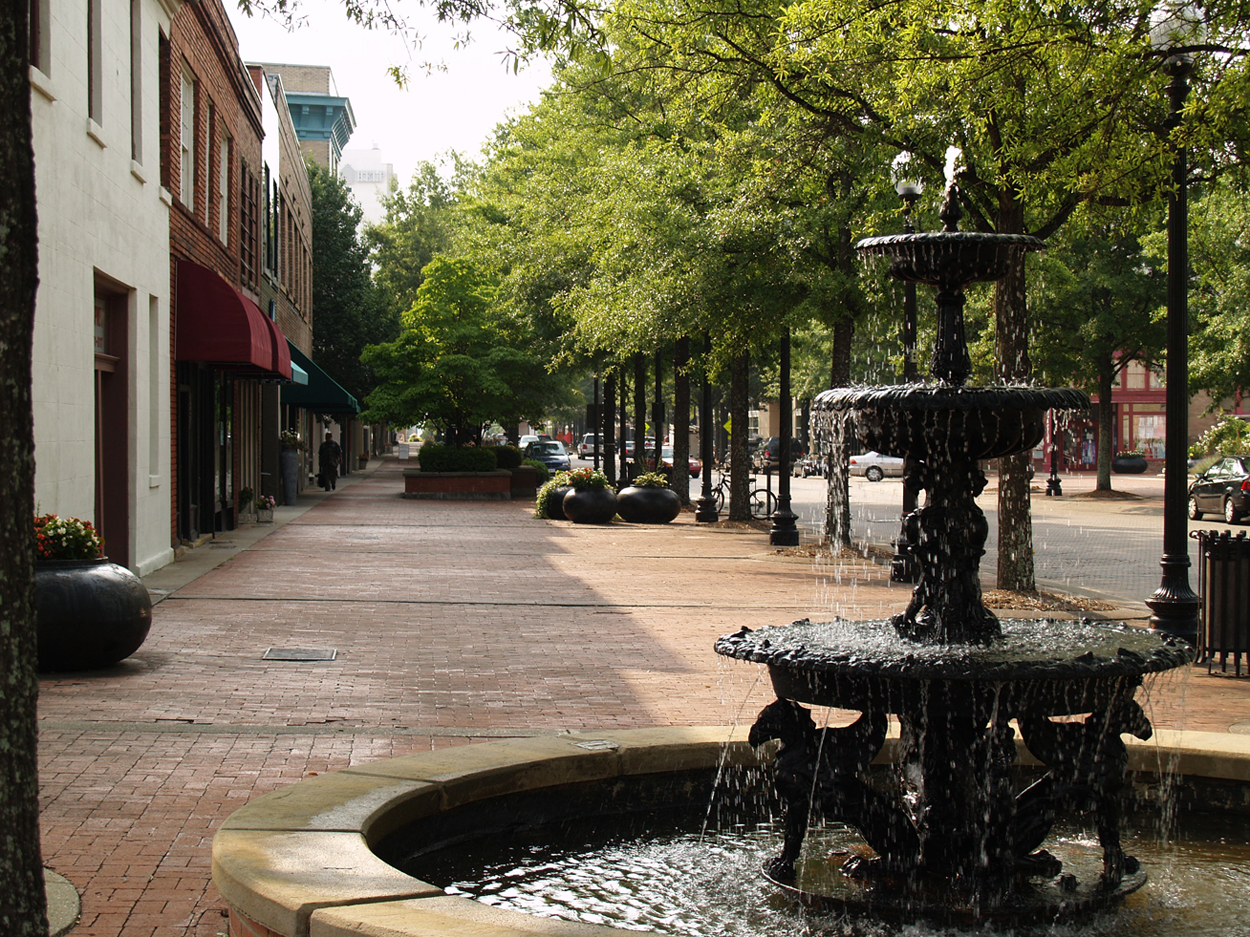
Hay Street in Downtown Fayetteville

==== Historic sites ====
- Cool Spring Tavern
- Evans Metropolitan AME Zion Church
- Ellerslie Plantation
- The first Golden Corral
- Hay Street United Methodist Church
- Heritage Square

==== Libraries ====
- Cumberland County Libraries

==== Museums ====
- Airborne & Special Operations Museum
- Museum of the Cape Fear Historical Complex

==== Parks and recreation ====
- Cape Fear Botanical Garden

In addition to city-managed spaces, the county is home to Carvers Creek State Park, which provides families with access to the historic Rockefeller House and diverse hiking trails.

==== Shopping ====
- Cross Creek Mall

==== Theaters and arenas ====
- Crown Coliseum

== Communities ==
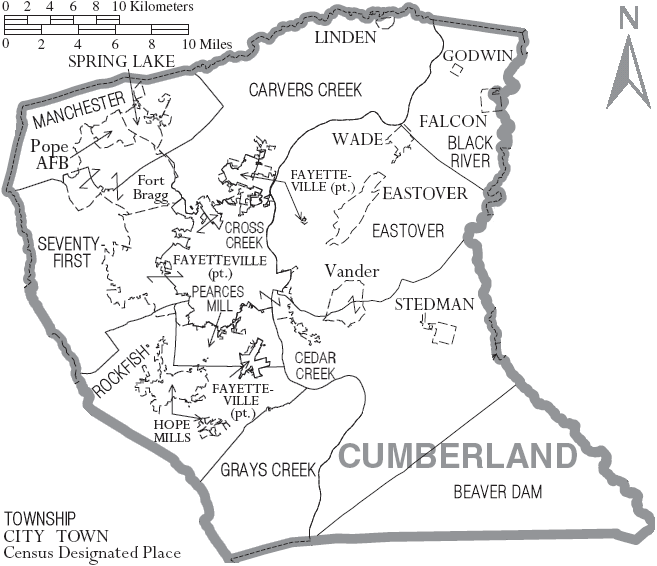
Map of Cumberland County with municipal and township labels

=== City ===
- Fayetteville (county seat and largest community)

=== Towns ===
- Eastover
- Falcon
- Godwin
- Hope Mills
- Linden
- Spring Lake
- Stedman
- Wade

=== Census-designated place ===
- Vander

=== Townships ===
- Beaver Dam
- Black River
- Carvers Creek
- Cedar Creek
- Cross Creek
- Eastover
- Gray's Creek
- Manchester
- Pearces Mill
- Rockfish
- Seventy-First

=== Unincorporated communities ===
- Chestnut Hills
- Cumberland, North Carolina
- Dogwood Acres
- Judson
- Montclair

== See also ==
- List of counties in North Carolina
- National Register of Historic Places listings in Cumberland County, North Carolina
- Lumbee Tribe of North Carolina, state-recognized tribe that resides in the county
