= Epperson =

Epperson is a surname. Notable people with the name include:

- Asia'h Epperson (born 1988), American singer and actress
- Brenda Epperson (born 1965), American actress and singer
- Chad Epperson (born 1972), American baseball manager, coach, and former player
- Charlie Epperson (1919–1996), American basketball player
- Don Epperson (1938–1973), American singer and actor
- Frank Epperson (1894–1983), inventor of the Popsicle in the 1920s
- Harold G. Epperson (1923–1944), American Medal of Honor holder
- Jay E (Jason Lee Epperson, born 1973), American record producer and DJ
- John Epperson (born 1955), American drag artist
- Lia Epperson (fl. from 1999), an American civil rights lawyer and professor
- Sharon Epperson, American business journalist
- Stuart Epperson, American businessman and politician
- Tom Epperson (fl. from 1992), American screenwriter

== Other uses ==
- USS Epperson (DD-719), a Navy destroyer named for Harold G. Epperson
- Epperson v. Arkansas, a 1968 Supreme Court case
- Epperson House, in Kansas City, Missouri
- Epperson Lagoon, in Wesley Chapel, Florida
- Epperson's Ferry, a 19th century crossing of the Sulphur River in Texas
- George Epperson House, in Jerome, Idaho
