= List of reportedly haunted locations in the United States =

This is a list of locations in the United States which have been reported to be haunted by ghosts or other supernatural beings, including demons.

States with several haunted locations are listed on separate pages, linked from this page. Many of them appeared on Ghost Adventures, Ghost Hunters (TV series), Haunted Towns, Ghost Asylum and Destination Fear (2019 TV series).

== A ==
=== Alabama ===
- The Boyington Oak in Mobile is a southern live oak that reportedly grew from the grave of Charles Boyington in the potter's field just outside the walls of Church Street Graveyard. Boyington was tried and executed for the murder of his friend, Nathaniel Frost, on February 20, 1835. He said a tree would spring from his grave as proof of his innocence.
- Kenworthy Hall near Marion has a fourth-floor tower room that is alleged to be haunted by the ghost of a young woman. She sits in a window awaiting the return of a lover who died during the American Civil War.
- Pratt Hall at Huntingdon College in Montgomery is reportedly haunted by a Red Lady. Huntingdon was originally a Methodist female college and the Red Lady is alleged to be the ghost of a lonely girl who committed suicide.
- Sturdivant Hall in Selma is purported to be haunted by the ghost of the second owner, John McGee Parkman. Parkman, imprisoned by Reconstruction authorities for alleged embezzlement, died during an escape attempt from Cahaba Prison in 1867.
- Sweetwater Mansion in Florence was built during 1828. Both Union and Confederate officers stayed there during their respective occupations of the city during the Civil War. Alleged paranormal activity has been investigated by local paranormal groups and a team from the television show Paranormal State.
- The Tombigbee River near Pennington is reportedly haunted by the ghost ship Eliza Battle. The ship is supposed to return during especially cold, stormy nights to warn of impending disaster. Likewise, the former captain of the James T. Staples reportedly appears near the site of that disaster at Bladon Springs.

=== Arizona ===
- Bird Cage Theatre in Tombstone is reportedly haunted.

=== Arkansas ===
- The Gurdon Light is a mysterious floating light above the railroad tracks near Gurdon (Clark County), a few miles away on Highway 67, which was first sighted during the 1930s. A popular legend is that a railroad worker was in an accident in which he was decapitated and now he is holding a lantern going up and down the tracks searching for his missing head. The other legend involves the murder of a foreman for the Missouri Pacific Railroad. The Gurdon Light was reportedly sighted shortly after his murder near those tracks during 1931. The local legend appeared on NBC's television program Unsolved Mysteries during 1994.
- The Crescent Hotel in Eureka Springs was featured on the television show Ghost Hunters in 2005.

== C ==
=== Colorado ===
- The Stanley Hotel in Estes Park was built by a Maine couple named F.O. and Flora Stanley. Staff says Flora can be heard playing her piano at night. Legends say Mr. Stanley might appear in photographs taken inside. Children can reportedly be heard running up and down the halls. The hotel was the inspiration for Stephen King's thriller, The Shining.

=== Connecticut ===
- Daniel Benton Homestead is a historic house museum in Tolland. It is reputedly haunted by the ghosts of Hessian soldiers and 18th-century lovers Elisha Benton and Jemima Barrows, who died from smallpox.
- Dudleytown is an abandoned town founded in the mid-1740s. It lies in the middle of a forested area in Cornwall. The original buildings are gone and only their foundations remain. Videos purport to show restless spirits in the area and hikers have reported seeing orbs in the area.
- Union Cemetery in Easton, which dates back to the 17th century, is touted as "one of the most haunted cemeteries in the entire country" by authors of paranormal books who claim that visitors have photographed orbs, light rods, ectoplasmic mists, and apparitions. A spirit known as the "White Lady" has also been reported.
- Norwich State Hospital is a former psychiatric hospital spreading across a 70-acre campus. Before the majority of it was demolished, there were reports of lamenting patients near the Salmon building and the lobotomy room. It was featured on Ghost Hunters season 6, episode 10.

== F ==
=== Florida ===
- The Vinoy Hotel in St. Petersburg has had reports of ghost sightings and other supernatural events at the hotel. Some of the reports were by visiting major league baseball players and staff, who stayed at the Vinoy when in town to play the Tampa Bay Rays.

== G ==
=== Georgia ===
- Ellis Hotel in Atlanta. Specters of the fire victims from December 7, 1946, wander this hotel.
- Igbo Landing in Dunbar Creek, St. Simons Island, is allegedly haunted by the souls of Igbo slaves who committed mass suicide by drowning there during 1803 to protest their enslavement.
- Sibley Mill in Augusta. The apparitions of Maude Williams and her lover, Arthur Glover, roam this site. It was featured on Ghost Asylum.

== I ==
=== Illinois ===
- Bachelor's Grove Cemetery, Midlothian, was mentioned on Most Terrifying Places in America.
- Former Chicago Historical Society Building is said to be haunted since its use as a temporary morgue for victims of the Eastland Disaster (1915).

=== Indiana ===
Waverly Hills Sanitorium in Louisville, Kentucky

== K ==
=== Kansas ===
- Sallie House in Atchison.
- Theorosa's Bridge between Sedgwick and Valley Center.

=== Kentucky ===
- Waverly Hills Sanatorium in Louisville is said to be haunted by former patients.
- Bobby Mackey's Music World in Wilder was a reportedly haunted nightclub. It was demolished in 2024.

== L ==
=== Louisiana ===
- Myrtles Plantation is allegedly home to several ghosts.
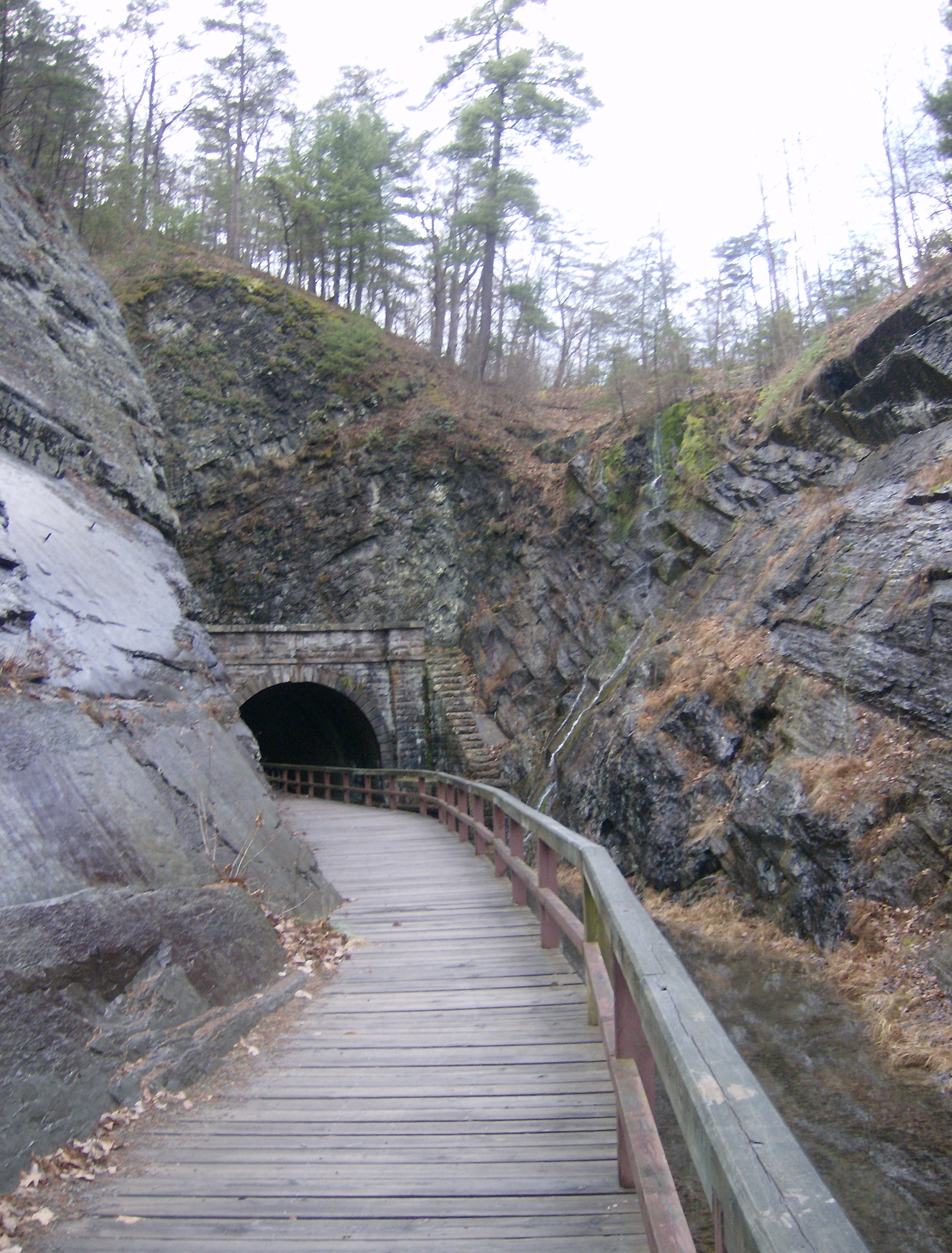
  East entrance of the Paw Paw Tunnel, Chesapeake and Ohio Canal

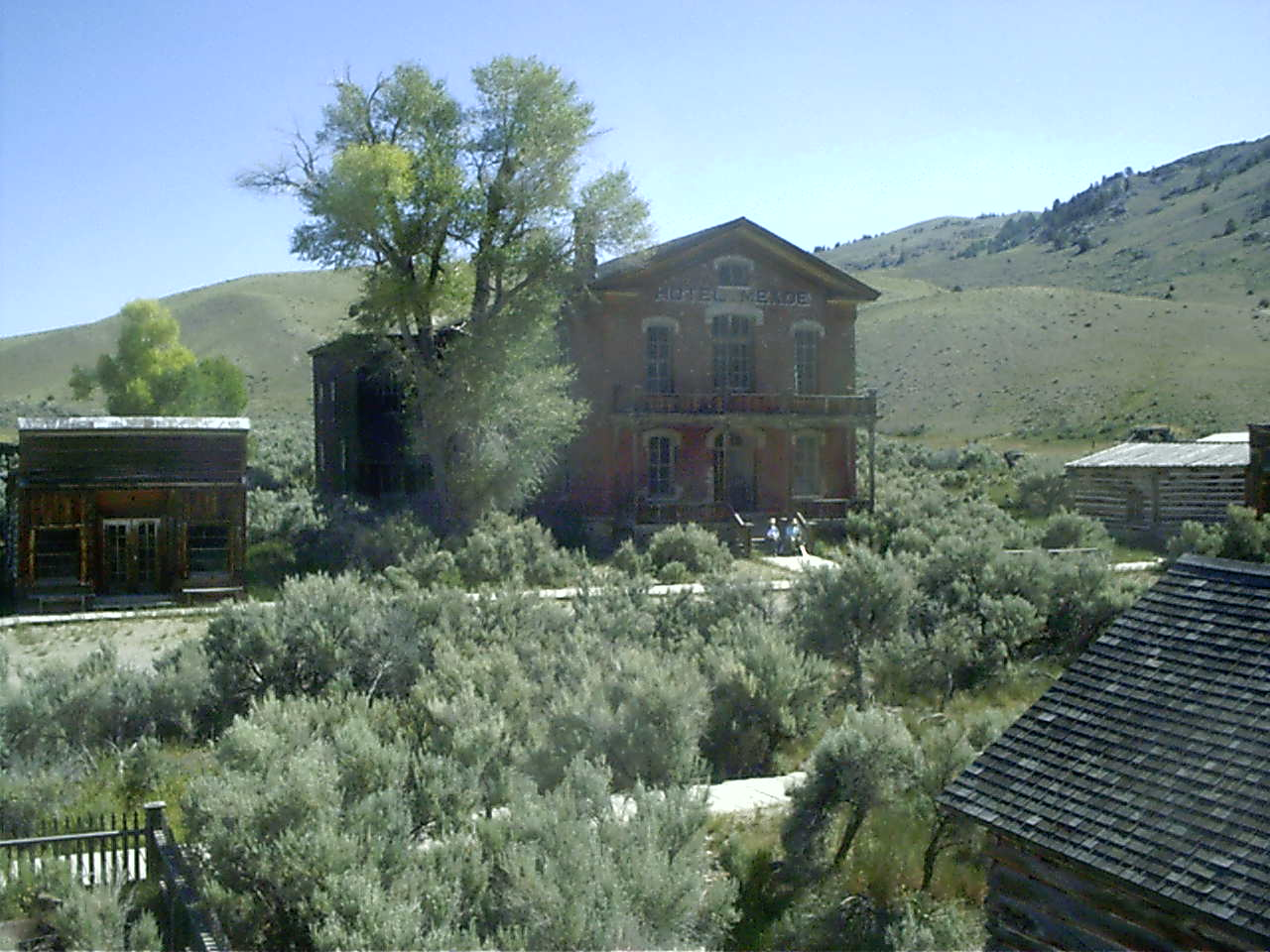
Bannack, Montana, a reportedly-haunted ghost town

== M ==
=== Maryland ===
- Chesapeake and Ohio Canal is said to have a few ghosts, including dead soldiers from the Battle of Ball's Bluff fought during the American Civil War haunting near the 33–34 mile mark, a lady ghost on the 2 mile level at Catoctin (between locks 28 and 29), a headless man haunting the Paw Paw Tunnel, and a ghost of a robber at the Monocacy Aqueduct carrying a lantern.

=== Michigan ===
- Big Bay Point Light is reputedly haunted by the red-haired ghost of its first keeper, Will Prior.
- The Landmark Inn in Marquette supposedly has a room haunted by a librarian who lost her lover in a shipwreck.
- Holly Hotel in Holly has had multiple paranormal occurrences before its closure in June 2022.

=== Minnesota ===
- Hibbing High School, built in 1920, is claimed to be haunted, with the vicinity of its elaborate auditorium hosting most of the school's paranormal activities.

=== Mississippi ===
- Riley Center in Meridian.

=== Missouri ===
- Epperson House on the University of Missouri–Kansas City campus
- Town of Avilla on historic Route 66 is said to have large numbers of Shadow Folk throughout village and also haunted by a Revenant Civil War-era bushwhacker nicknamed "Rotten Johnny Reb", from a gruesome historical event now known as the "Legend of the Avilla Death Tree".
- Lemp Mansion in St. Louis, Missouri, is said to be haunted.

=== Montana ===
- Bannack, a ghost town, was founded in 1862. Several claims of hauntings have been made there, including the apparition of a woman in a blue gown named Dorothy who drowned in Grasshopper Creek. A gang of outlaws were also executed in the town and their ghosts are said to haunt the area. There were several epidemics of illnesses there as well, and a reported 8 to 14 infants died in the town.
- Boulder Hot Springs Hotel, near Boulder is said to be haunted by "Simone", the ghost of a prostitute who was murdered at the hotel.
- Carroll College, in Helena, supposedly has a ghost in the men's restroom in St. Charles Hall, where a drunken student died of a cerebral hemorrhage after falling and smashing his head against a sink in the middle of the night.
- The Copper King Mansion in Butte is said to be haunted by its original owner, William A. Clark. The mansion also served as a Catholic convent during the early 1900s.
- Garnet, a ghost town about 40 miles (64 km) outside of Missoula, is said to be haunted by several ghosts, including gold miners and a woman executed for murder there.
- The Little Bighorn Battlefield, located near Hardin, is said to be haunted by the ghosts of both U.S. soldiers and Native Americans who participated in the battle.
- Montana Territorial Prison in Deer Lodge is said to be among the most haunted locations in the state. A number of deaths occurred there, including during a riot in 1959.
- Virginia City, a ghost town-turned-tourist attraction, is said to be haunted. The saloon and theater are two areas of reported ghost sightings.

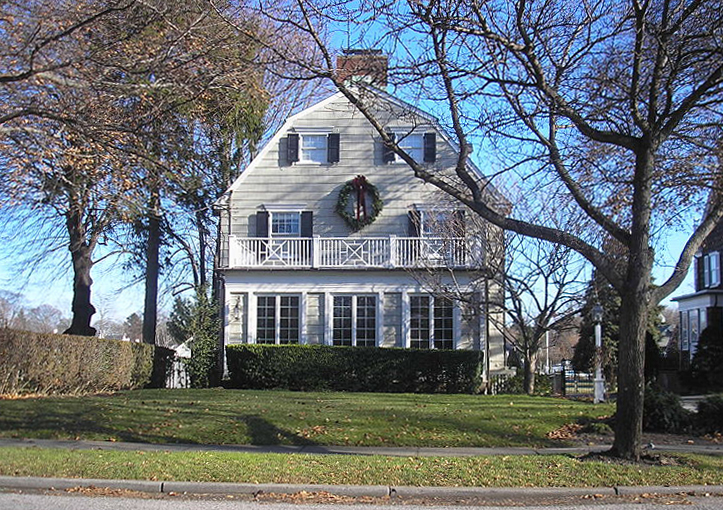
Paranormal experiences reported at 112 Ocean Avenue House in Amityville, New York, inspired The Amityville Horror book and film.

== N ==
=== Nevada ===
- The Nevada Governor's Mansion in Carson City was first occupied by the family of Governor Denver S. Dickerson during July 1909. Guests and staff have reported seeing a woman and child on the premises, thought to be Dickerson's wife Una and daughter June, the only child to have been born in the residence.

=== New Jersey ===
- Leeds Point is the birthplace of the Jersey Devil. The Pine Barrens gave fame to the legend of the Jersey Devil, said to have been birthed by a local woman named Mrs. Leeds during 1735. The child, Mrs. Leed's thirteenth, was unwanted, so she cursed the child by saying, "May it be the devil!" The child was supposedly born an inhuman monster, and it flew out of the house into the pine barrens shortly after birth.

=== New Mexico ===
- KiMo Theater in Albuquerque is said to be haunted by the ghost of a child who was killed at the theatre in 1951 when a water heater exploded.

=== New York ===
- 112 Ocean Avenue in Amityville, also known as the Amityville Horror House, was the scene of the mass murder of the DeFeo family on November 13, 1974, committed by Ronald DeFeo Jr. The Lutz family, the next inhabitants of the home, claimed that it was haunted and fled after 28 days. Their experiences were described by Jay Anson's 1977 bestselling book, The Amityville Horror, which was followed by the 1979 movie of the same name. Despite accusations of fraud, the Lutzes maintained that they experienced paranormal phenomena while living in the Ocean Avenue home.
- Cherry Hill Estate in southern Albany is a late 18th-century farm manor house that was the site of an 1827 murder that resulted in Albany's last public hanging after a controversial trial. An unidentified ghost has allegedly been seen on the property.
- The Fire Island Lighthouse is said to be haunted by the ghosts of a lighthouse keeper and his daughter as well as the spirits of people who died in shipwrecks nearby including author and women's activist Margaret Fuller.
- Merchant's House Museum in Manhattan is the last home in New York City from the nineteenth-century to be intact, and is reportedly haunted by former resident Gertrude Tredwell that died in 1933.
- Kings Park Psychiatric Center in Kings Park was a psychiatric hospital that opened in 1885 and closed in 1996. Many buildings including Building 93 are reportedly haunted by its former patients.
- The Morris–Jumel Mansion is the oldest extant home on Manhattan and has reportedly experienced hauntings for over 200 years. The property once was used as the headquarters of George Washington in the Revolutionary war and later became the home of Eliza Jumel, the former wife of Aaron Burr. Jumel reported hauntings at the house upon her purchase of the property in 1810.

=== North Carolina ===
- The Attmore-Oliver House in New Bern has allegedly been the scene of some poltergeist-like activity stemming possibly from either deaths in the house during a smallpox epidemic or the spirit of the last private owner.
- Brown Mountain in Burke and Caldwell counties is reputed to have ghostly orbs of light radiating from the mountain. According to local Cherokee legend, the "Brown Mountain Lights" date back as far as 1200. This was the year of a great battle, and they believed the lights to be the spirits of Native maidens who still search for lost loved ones. Also, there has been speculation of extraterrestrial activity. Wiseman's View on Linville Mountain is the best vantage point for viewing the lights. This lookout was used by a German engineer, William de Brahm during 1771 while studying the phenomenon. He attributed the lights to nitrous gases emitting from the mountain and combusting upon collision, but his theories were later disproven.
- The Carolina Theatre in Greensboro was set ablaze on July 1, 1981, by a woman who was assumed mentally disturbed. Melba Frey went up to the upper balcony and started the fire, which burned the entire balcony and lobby. Her body was found in the stairway by firefighters, and she is now believed to haunt the area in which she died, flipping the folding seats up and down.
- Fayetteville allegedly hosts ghosts such as "The Lady in Black" who haunts the Sandford House, formerly known as the Slocumb House. Her apparition first appeared in the late 19th century and has been sighted by members of The Woman's Club of Fayetteville.
- The Harvey Mansion Historic Inn and Restaurant in New Bern has claims of an older woman in 18th-century dress haunting the second and third floors.
- The S. H. Kress and Co. Building in Durham was allegedly haunted by the ghost of the father of Anna Lee Powers in the 1940s.
- The Tar River, near Tarboro in Edgecombe County, is associated with a legend of a banshee. The legend speaks of a Patriot miller who was killed by a small group of British soldiers during the American Revolution. Before they drowned him in the river, he warned the soldiers that if he were killed, they would be haunted by a banshee. After his death, she appeared and caused the deaths of the soldiers and supposedly still haunts the river.

=== North Dakota ===
- The Liberty Memorial Building in Bismarck, according to former employees is said to be haunted by a ghostly presence nicknamed the "Stack Monster".
- Saint Anne's Guest Home, a Catholic health care facility in Grand Forks has a reputation for being haunted by the ghost of Sister Mary Murphy, who reportedly committed suicide by throwing herself from the bell tower in 1978.

== O ==
=== Ohio ===
- Arnold's Bar and Grill, the oldest continuously operated bar in Cincinnati, is rumored to be haunted.
- Cincinnati Music Hall is a theater that was built over a potter's field. Reports of spirits on the property date back to 1876. During 1988, during the installation of an elevator shaft, bones of adults and children were exhumed from under the hall.

=== Oklahoma ===
- Dead Women Crossing in Weatherford allegedly has paranormal activities including a mysterious blue light that originates in the creek and a spectral woman crying for her baby around the area.

== R ==
=== Rhode Island ===
- Fleur-de-lys Studios in Providence is said to be haunted by Angela O'Leary, a watercolor painter and member of the Providence Art Club. O'Leary committed suicide in the studio of her mentor, Sydney Richmond Burleigh after supposedly being spurned by him.

== S ==
=== South Carolina ===
- Pawleys Island is said to be haunted by a Gray Man, who appears shortly before dangerous storms to warn the inhabitants.
- Camden's Bethesda Presbyterian Church is reportedly haunted by Agnes of Glasgow, a woman who followed her lover to the United States, but died before she could find him.
- Rosemary Hall (North Augusta, South Carolina) in North Augusta.

=== South Dakota ===
- Hotel Alex Johnson in Rapid City is said to be haunted by several ghosts, including the former owner and a Lady in White that haunts the eighth floor. The hotel was featured on Ghost Hunters in 2011.

== T ==
=== Tennessee ===
- The town of Adams was the site of the Bell Witch haunting, as well as the Bell Witch Cave.
- The Carnton Mansion in Franklin was used as a hospital for Confederate Soldiers during the Civil War. Many of the deceased here were buried in mass graves and some of their ghosts are alleged to haunt the site.
- The Orpheum Theatre in Memphis is said to be haunted by the ghost of a small girl who was killed in a car accident in front of the theater.

=== Texas ===
- The commissary at the Houston Zoo has been said to be haunted by the first zookeeper, Hans Nagel, who was shot by a park police officer during late 1941 after being caught spying on teenagers in a parked car.
- The Menger Hotel is located in San Antonio. It is part of the Historic downtown district; opened for business in February 1859.
- The Marfa lights have been attributed to haunting. In May 2004, students from the Society of Physics Students at the University of Texas at Dallas spent four days investigating and recording lights observed southwest of the view park using traffic volume monitoring equipment, video cameras, binoculars, and chase cars. The conclusion was that all of the lights observed over a four night period southwest of the view park could be reliably attributed to automobile headlights traveling along U.S. 67 between Marfa and Presidio, Texas.
- The book The Black Hope Horror details a couple's experience in a then-newly built subdivision in Crosby, which was built on the remains of an abandoned cemetery for slaves and sharecroppers. The couple stated that they experienced several supernatural phenomena and that it may have been responsible for the deaths of several family members.

== U ==
=== Utah ===
- Harold B. Lee Library at Brigham Young University in Provo.

== W ==
=== Washington ===
- The Harvard Exit Theatre in Capitol Hill, Seattle, is said to be haunted by the ghost of a "beautiful woman" who is sometimes seen crying.
- The parsonage of First Methodist Protestant Church of Seattle in Capitol Hill is said to be haunted by the ghost of Susannah Bagley, wife of pioneer preacher and Territorial University of Washington founder Daniel Bagley. In one reported sighting, she appeared "in a diaphanous flowing gown, surrounded by a bluish light. When she asked, "How do I get out?" he pointed to the door, but she serenely floated out the upstairs window instead."
- Ye College Inn in Seattle's University District is said to be haunted by "Howard", a beer-drinking ghost who habitually wears a tan trench coat.

=== Wisconsin ===
- The Pfister Hotel in downtown Milwaukee is said to be haunted.

=== Wyoming ===
- Wyoming Frontier Prison, in Rawlins, is said to be haunted. The location was featured in season eight of Travel Channel's Ghost Adventures.

== See also ==
- List of reportedly haunted locations in Canada
- Reportedly haunted locations in the United Kingdom
- List of ghosts
