= Daingerfield (surname) =

Daingerfield is a surname. Notable people with the surname include:

- Elliott Daingerfield (1859–1932), American artist
- John E.P. Daingerfield, American Confederate officer
- Michael Daingerfield (born 1970), Canadian actor
- William H. Daingerfield (1808–1878), American politician and Texan envoy to Europe
