= Nimocks House =

Nimocks House may refer to:

in the United States (by state)

- Hawkins-Nimocks Estate-Patricio Ontiveros Adobe, Santa Fe Springs, California, listed on the National Register of Historic Places in Los Angeles County, California
- Nimocks House (Fayetteville, North Carolina), listed on the National Register of Historic Places in Cumberland County, North Carolina
- Nimocks House (Wellington, Ohio), listed on the National Register of Historic Places in Lorain County, Ohio
