= Gracie's Sea Hag =

Restaurant in Depoe Bay, Oregon, U.S.

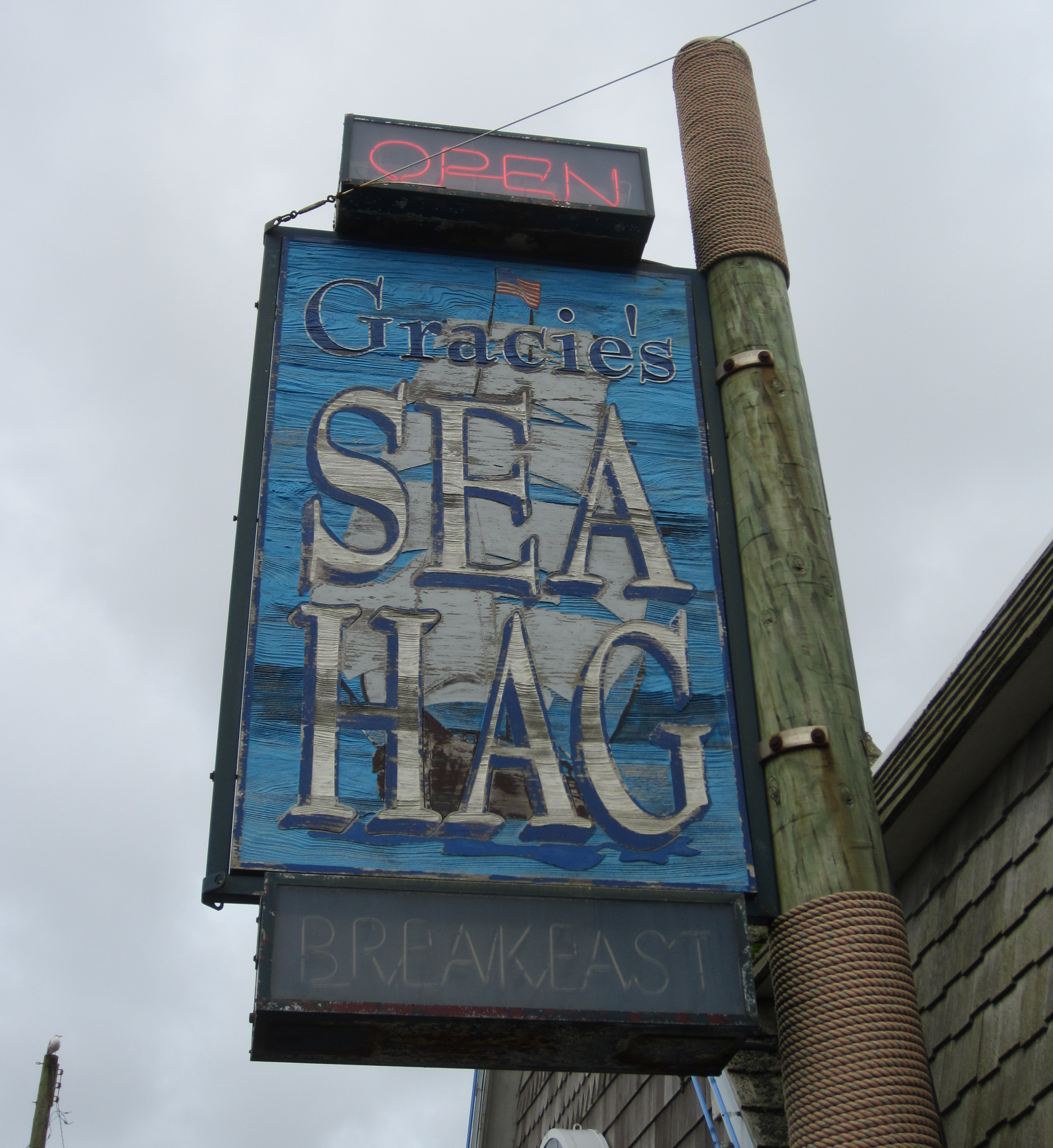
- Sign for the restaurant, 2012
- Interactive map of Gracie's Sea Hag

Restaurant information
- Established: 1963
- Food type: Seafood
- Location: 58 US-101, Depoe Bay, Lincoln, Oregon, 97341, United States
- Coordinates: 44°48′39.2″N 124°3′42.4″W

Gracie's Sea Hag is a seafood restaurant in Depoe Bay, Oregon, United States.

== Description ==
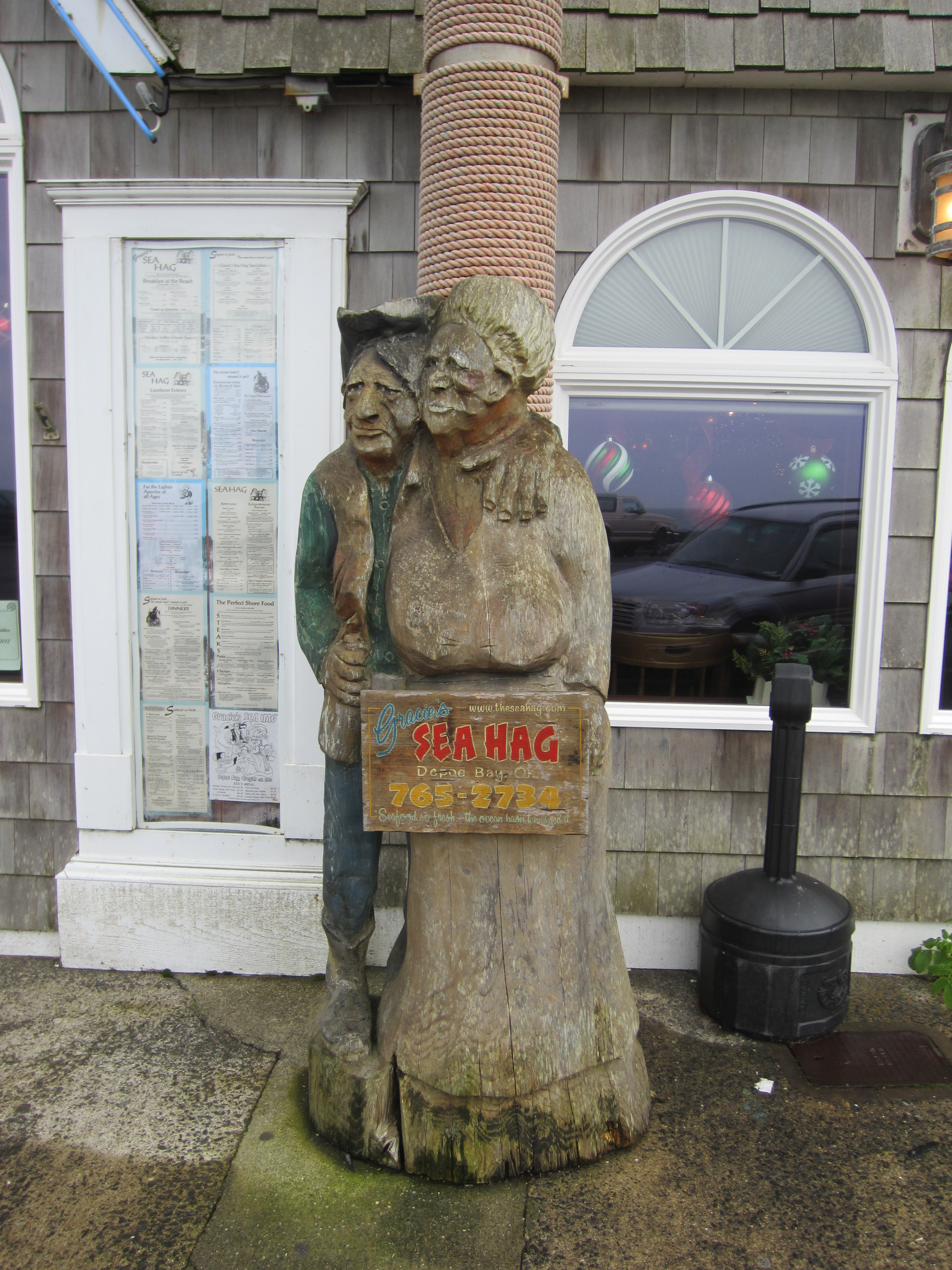
Statue of a sea hag and her husband outside the restaurant in 2012

In 2016, Michael Russell of The Oregonian called Gracie's Sea Hag "a long-standing seafood dive". Outside the restaurant is a statue of a sea hag and her husband. Popular among locals and tourists, Gracie's Sea Hag is reportedly haunted.

== History ==
Gracie Strom opened the restaurant in 1963. Clary and Jerome Grant are the owners.

== Reception ==
Michael Russell of The Oregonian included Gracie's Sea Hag in a 2016 overview of recommended eateries along the Oregon Coast and said the restaurant had "surprisingly good grub". Matthew Korfhage included Gracie's Sea Hag in Willamette Week's 2016 list of the ten best clam chowders along the Oregon Coast. In 2019, The Oregonian's Jamie Hale said Gracie's Sea Hag was "one of the most beloved establishments on the central Oregon coast". He also included the restaurant in a 2020 list of twenty reasons to love Depoe Bay. In 2022, Margaret Seiler included Gracie's Sea Hag in Portland Monthly's list of twelve "essential" Oregon Coast bars. She wrote, "Sit under a mermaid portrait, try the famous buttery clam chowder, listen to a musician sitting at a piano but strumming a guitar, and catch the regular percussion show when the bartender plays the liquor bottles."

== See also ==
- List of reportedly haunted locations in the United States
