= Epperson's Ferry =

Epperson's Ferry was one of two locations to cross the Sulphur River during the first half of the 19th century in Northeast Texas, United States, the other being Stephenson's Ferry to the west. One of the last crossings made on Trammel's Trace.

== History ==
By 1854, the early citizens of Bowie and Cass counties were anxious to improve their ability to get their cotton to markets and ports down river, and made an ambitious effort of their own. That year they collected $ 2,400, an incredible amount of money for the time, to clean out the river to allow steamboats to make it as far as Epperso'’s Ferry. They appointed commissioners and gave contracts to clear the Sulphur to eighty feet wide. From the center to thirty feet on either side, all stumps and logjams were to be removed, and then another ten feet into each bank all overhangs and snags were cleared. Plans were executed to the point that farmers stacked bales of cotton at Epperson's bluff in the spring of 1855 in anticipation of the arrival of a boat able to carry the freight. Low water that year prevented access, but on March 10, 1856, Captain R.C. Hutchinson in his steamer, Julia, made it all the way to Epperson's Ferry.

By that time, railroads were offering more speed and capacity compared to the lower and slower freight by uncertain steamboats on Texas rivers. By 1859 contracts were being let by the Memphis, El Paso, & Pacific Railroad for fifty miles of track to the Sulphur Fork in Bowie County, and the brief steamboat era of Epperson’s Ferry was over.

The monument was later moved several miles to a spot off of U.S. Highway 67 east of Maud due to the creation of Lake Wright Patman, which led to recurring floods which would cover the marker during periods of high rainfall.

== See also ==
- Historic trails and roads in the United States
