= Harold G. Epperson =

WWII Medal of Honor Recipient

Harold Glenn Epperson
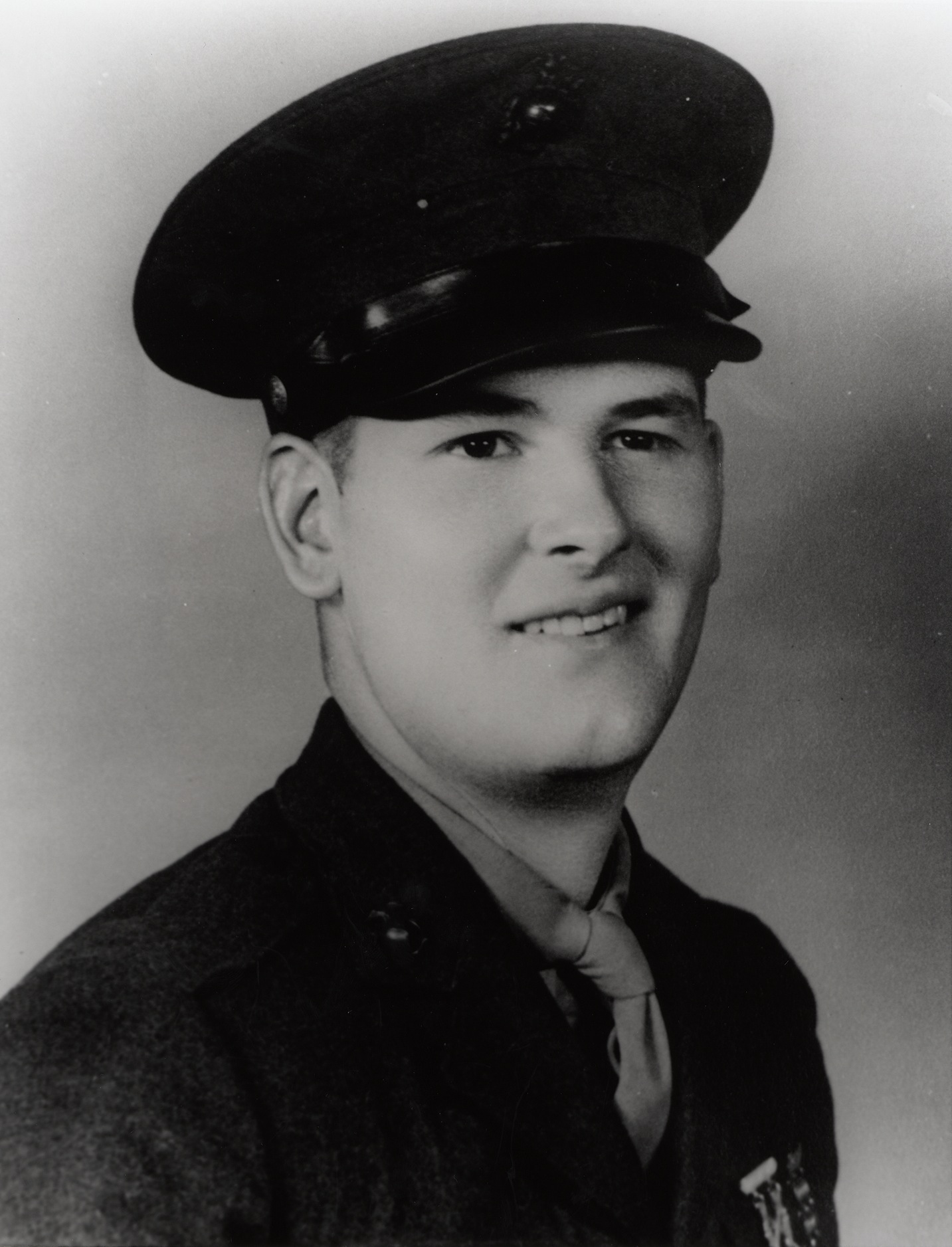
- Harold G. Epperson, Medal of Honor recipient
- Born: July 14, 1923; Akron, Ohio
- Died: June 25, 1944 (aged 20); Saipan, Marianas Islands
- Burial place: Initially the 2nd Marine Division Cemetery on Saipan, Marianas Islands re-interred in Winchester Cemetery, Winchester, Kentucky
- Military career
- Allegiance: United States of America
- Branch: United States Marine Corps
- Service years: 1942–1944
- Rank: Private First Class
- Units: 1st Battalion 6th Marines, 2nd Marine Division
- Conflicts: World War II: Battle of Tarawa; Battle of Saipan †
- Awards: Medal of Honor; Purple Heart

Private First Class Harold Glenn Epperson, USMCR (July 14, 1923 – June 25, 1944) was a United States Marine who posthumously received the Medal of Honor, the United States' highest military honor, for his actions during the World War II Battle of Saipan.

== Biography ==
Born in Akron, Ohio, Epperson grew up in Massillon and graduated from Washington High School there in 1941. He was employed at Goodyear Aircraft in Akron before enlisting in the Marine Corps Reserve on December 12, 1942.

A member of the 1st Battalion 6th Marines, he also shared in the Presidential Unit Citation awarded his organization for its service at the Battle of Tarawa.

PFC Epperson died in action against the Japanese on Saipan on June 25, 1944, when he threw himself upon an enemy grenade in order to save the lives of his fellow Marines.

Epperson's Medal of Honor was presented to his mother in a ceremony on Wednesday, July 4, 1945, in Tiger Stadium, Massillon, Ohio, with the Massillon High School Band and 8,500 of the people of the town where Epperson grew up. The medal was presented by Col. Norman E. True, district Marine officer of the 9th Naval District and commanding officer of the Marine Barracks at Great Lakes, Illinois. Epperson's parents, who moved to Mount Sterling, Kentucky following their son's death, returned to Massillon for the ceremonies because they felt their son "would have liked it that way." The citation signed by President Harry S. Truman, and a letter from Gen. Alexander A. Vandegrift, Commandant of the Marine Corps, were read by Col. True during the ceremony.

Initially buried in the 2nd Marine Division Cemetery on Saipan, Marianas Islands, PFC Epperson's remains were re-interred in Winchester Cemetery, Winchester, Kentucky, in 1948.

== Medal of Honor citation ==
Rank and organization: Private First Class, U.S. Marine Corps Reserve. Born: July 14, 1923, Akron, Ohio. Accredited to: Ohio.

Citation:

For conspicuous gallantry and intrepidity at the risk of his life above and beyond the call of duty while serving with the 1st Battalion, 6th Marines, 2d Marine Division, in action against enemy Japanese forces on the Island of Saipan in the Marianas, on 25 June 1944. With his machinegun emplacement bearing the full brunt of a fanatic assault initiated by the Japanese under cover of predawn darkness, Pfc. Epperson manned his weapon with determined aggressiveness, fighting furiously in the defense of his battalion's position and maintaining a steady stream of devastating fire against rapidly infiltrating hostile troops to aid materially in annihilating several of the enemy and in breaking the abortive attack. Suddenly a Japanese soldier, assumed to be dead, sprang up and hurled a powerful hand grenade into the emplacement. Determined to save his comrades, Pfc. Epperson unhesitatingly chose to sacrifice himself and, diving upon the deadly missile, absorbed the shattering violence of the exploding charge in his own body. Stouthearted and indomitable in the face of certain death, Pfc. Epperson fearlessly yielded his own life that his able comrades might carry on the relentless battle against a ruthless enemy. His superb valor and unfaltering devotion to duty throughout reflect the highest credit upon himself and upon the U.S. Naval Service. He gallantly gave his life for his country.

== Awards and decorations ==

1st row	Medal of Honor		
2nd row	Purple Heart	Combat Action Ribbon	Presidential Unit Citation
3rd row	American Campaign Medal	Asiatic-Pacific Campaign Medal with one campaign star	World War II Victory Medal

== USS Epperson ==
The USS Epperson (DD-719), a destroyer named in honor of HG Epperson, was launched on December 23, 1945, in Port Newark, New Jersey.

== Grave Memorial ==
https://www.findagrave.com/memorial/7744837/harold-glenn-epperson

== See also ==
- List of Medal of Honor recipients
- List of Medal of Honor recipients for World War II
