= Attmore–Oliver House =

Historic house in North Carolina, United States

- U.S. National Register of Historic Places
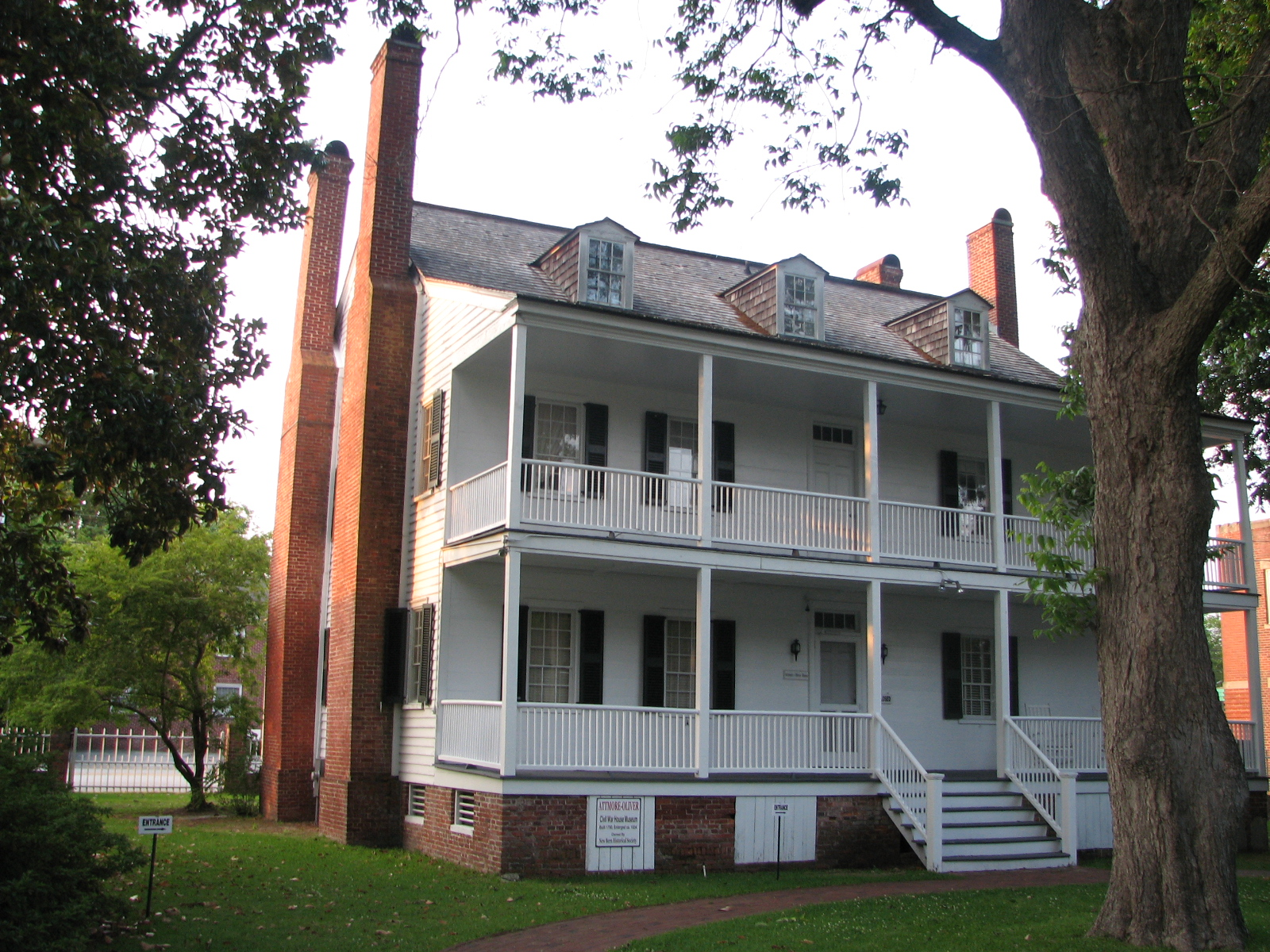
- Attmore–Oliver House

- Location within North Carolina Location within the United States
- Location: New Bern, North Carolina
- Coordinates: 35°6′30″N 77°2′31″W
- Built: 1790
- NRHP reference No.: 72000932
- Added to NRHP: January 20, 1972

The Attmore–Oliver House is a building on the National Register of Historic Places in New Bern, North Carolina. It is on 511 Broad Street and in the New Bern National Historic District. It was originally built in 1790 and enlarged around 1834. The house is white and features three stories and a large porch in both the front and the back.

The house is owned by the New Bern Historical Society and is used for Society functions. It no longer operates as a house museum. Limited displays are open for self-guided tours by appointment.

The house is also supposedly one of the most haunted houses in New Bern.

== Resources ==
- The Attmore–Oliver House brochure
