= Woman's Club of Fayetteville =

The Woman's Club of Fayetteville is a charitable society founded in 1906 in Fayetteville, North Carolina. The Club is responsible for the first library in Fayetteville and Cumberland County, North Carolina. The Woman's Club is located in Fayetteville's Heritage Square and is dedicated to its restoration and preservation.

== History ==
The Woman’s Club of Fayetteville was founded on November 6, 1906, as the Civic Improvement Association (a.k.a. Woman's Civic Improvement League). Originally, its goal was to protest the proposed destruction of the Market House, a historical city building. According to club literature, it wasn't until 1920 that it was named "The Woman's Club".

The club is responsible for the first library in Fayetteville, launched between 1907 and 1910 on the second floor of the Market House. Private donations filled the shelves until the 1910 book reception from which the available book number rose to 725 books. At that time, subscription rates were $2.00/family, $1.50 for individuals, and $0.50 for children. The library became public (and free for all Cumberland county residents) on December 18, 1933.

During World War II, the Woman's Club opened their doors to provide a home for unmarried working women flooding into the city at that time. Thirty young, single women, a housemother and hostess packed the four bedrooms with dormitory type furniture to serve their needs. The Woman's Club also provided space for any other women's organization to meet in the house free of charge in an effort to accommodate the town's growing need for social outlets.

In 1941, the club purchased the "Slocumb House" but later renamed it the "Sandford House." Thirty years later, the club petitioned the National Register of Historic Places to make the Sandford House, the Oval Ballroom (a relocated free-standing room), and the Nimocks House historic landmarks. All three buildings are located on Heritage Square in Fayetteville. In 1972 and 1973, the petitions were granted. Today, the club restores and maintains these historic landmarks on Heritage Square, open to the public by appointment.

== Maintenance and restoration projects ==
Today, the Woman's Club restores and preserves Fayetteville's Heritage Square. The three buildings that comprise Heritage Square are on the National Register of Historic Places in the United States.

According to the 2007-2008 Woman's Club president, the club works to preserve Heritage Square with no government grants. During 2007, repairs such as painting to historical standards and replacing structural beams were completed at a cost of over $100,000. Restoration of the Nimocks House and gardens follow.

== Gallery ==
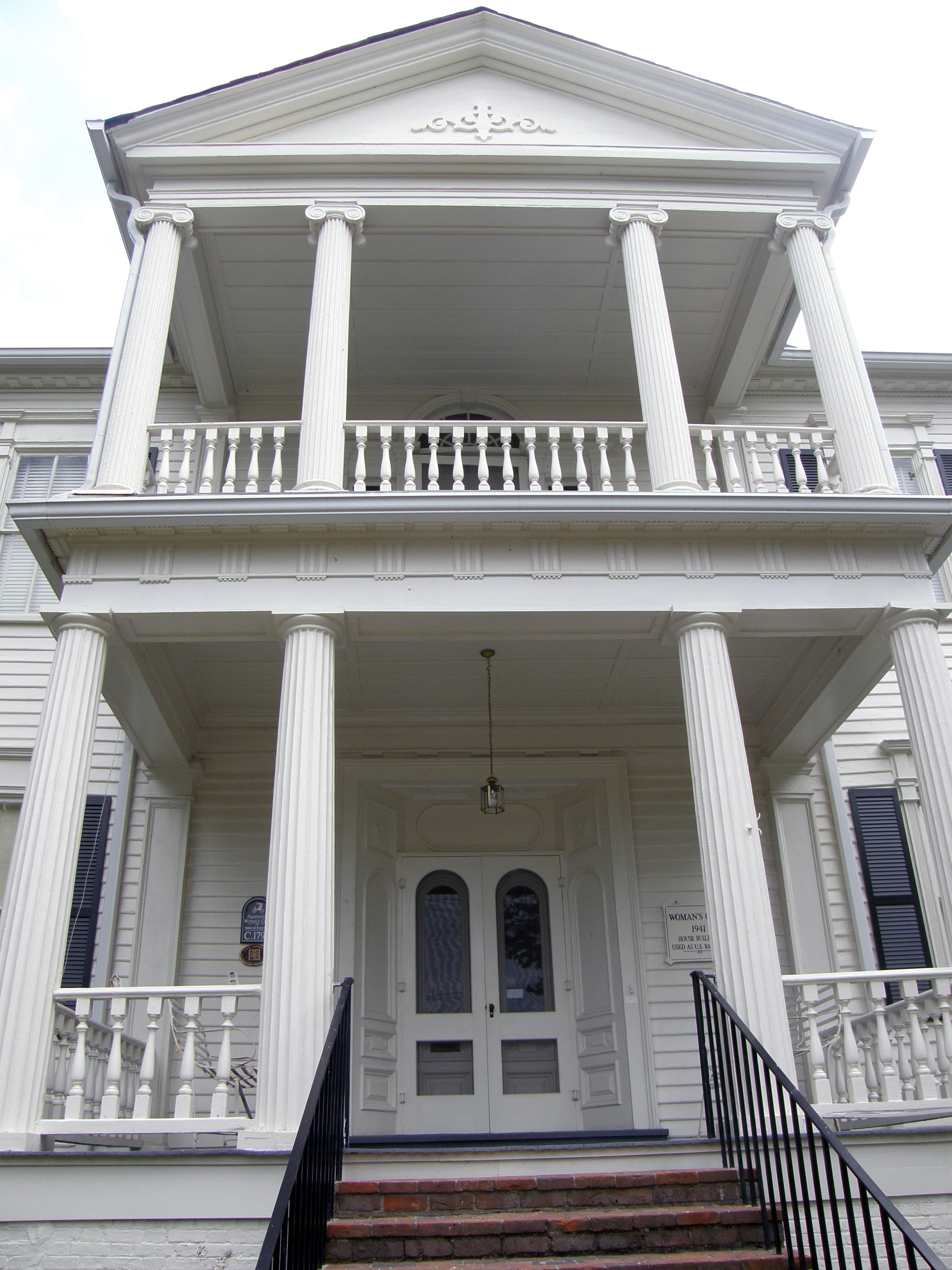
The Sandford House freshly painted

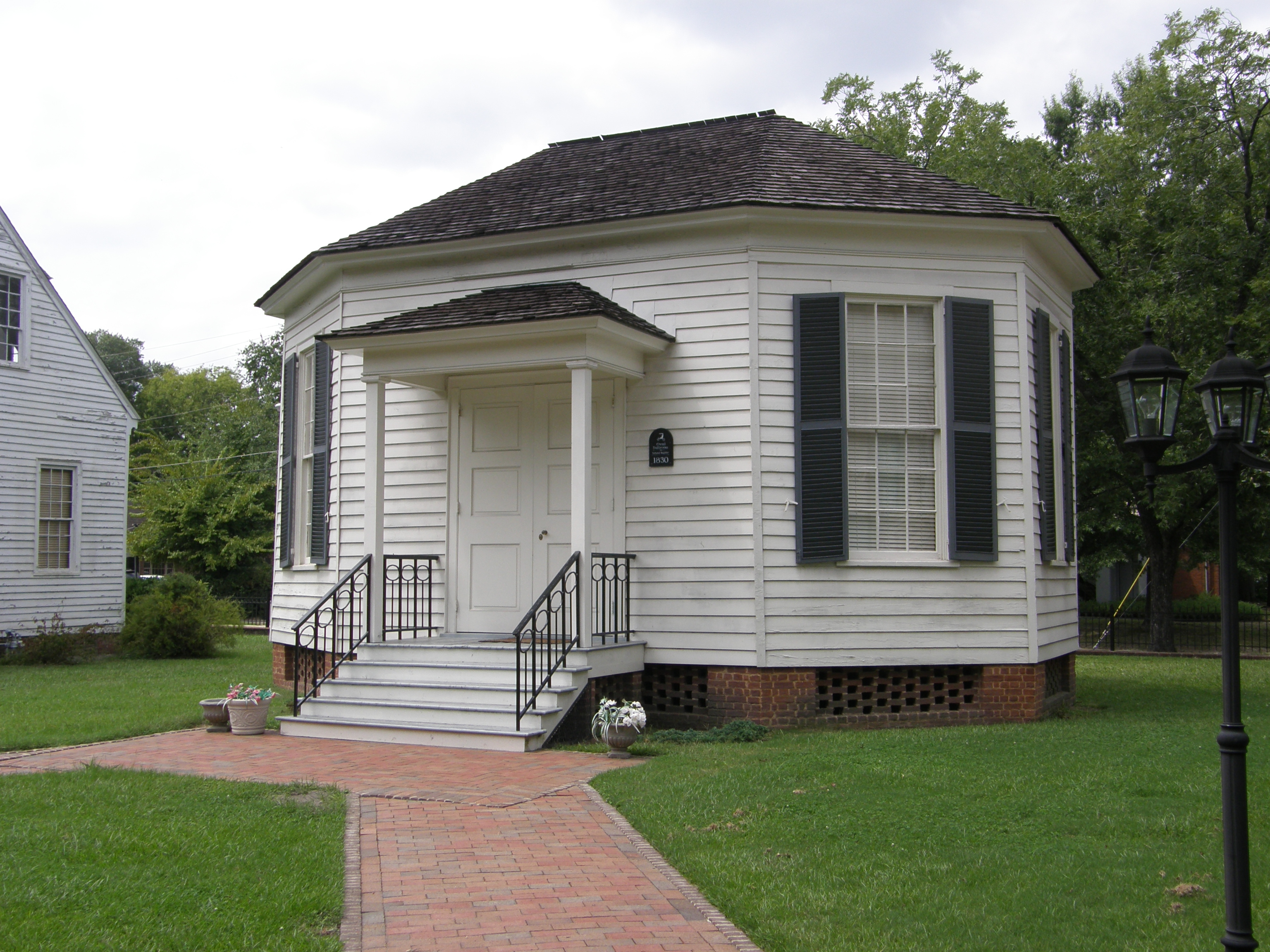
The Oval Ballroom

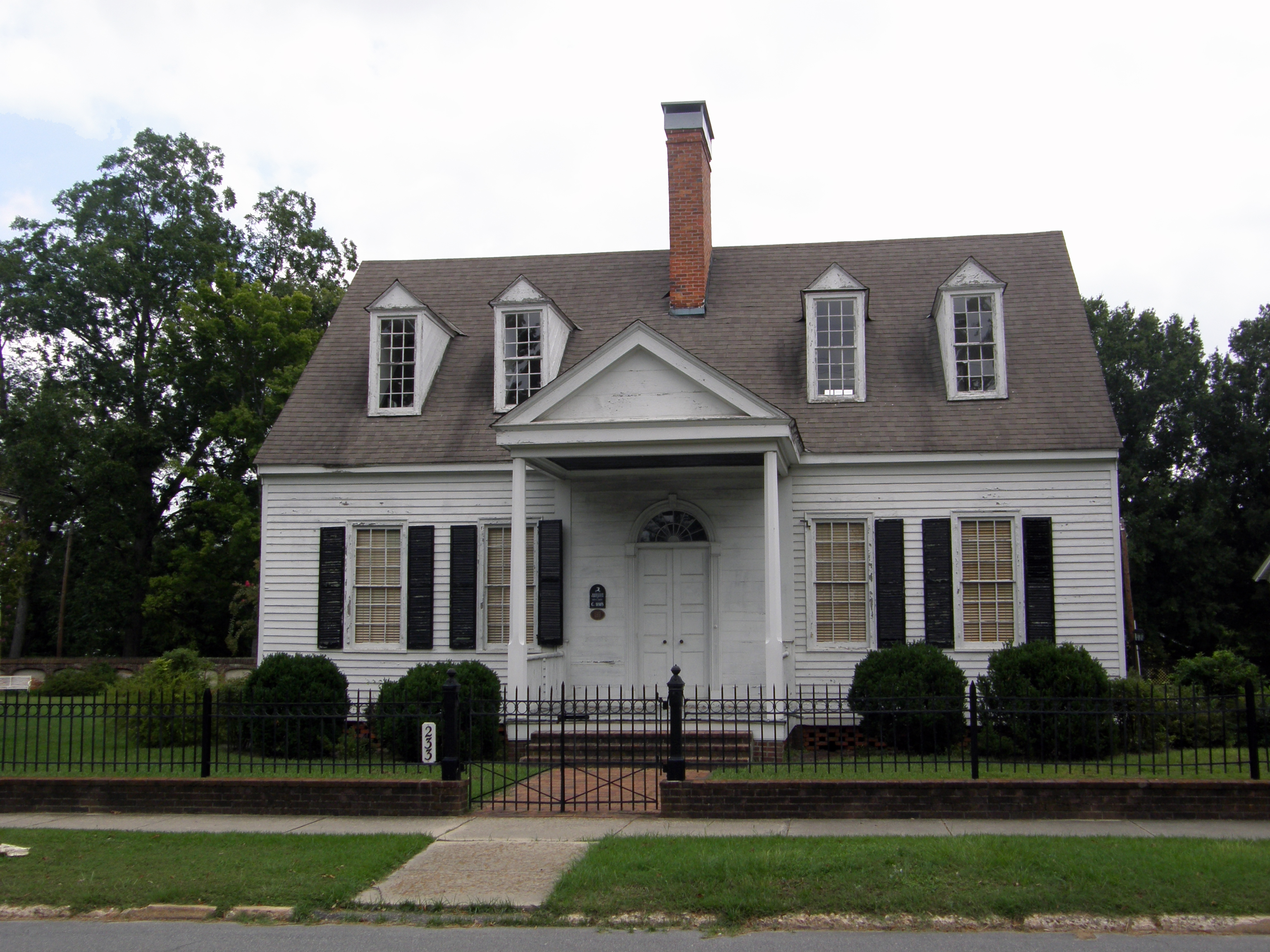
Baker-Haigh-Nimocks House viewed from Dick Street

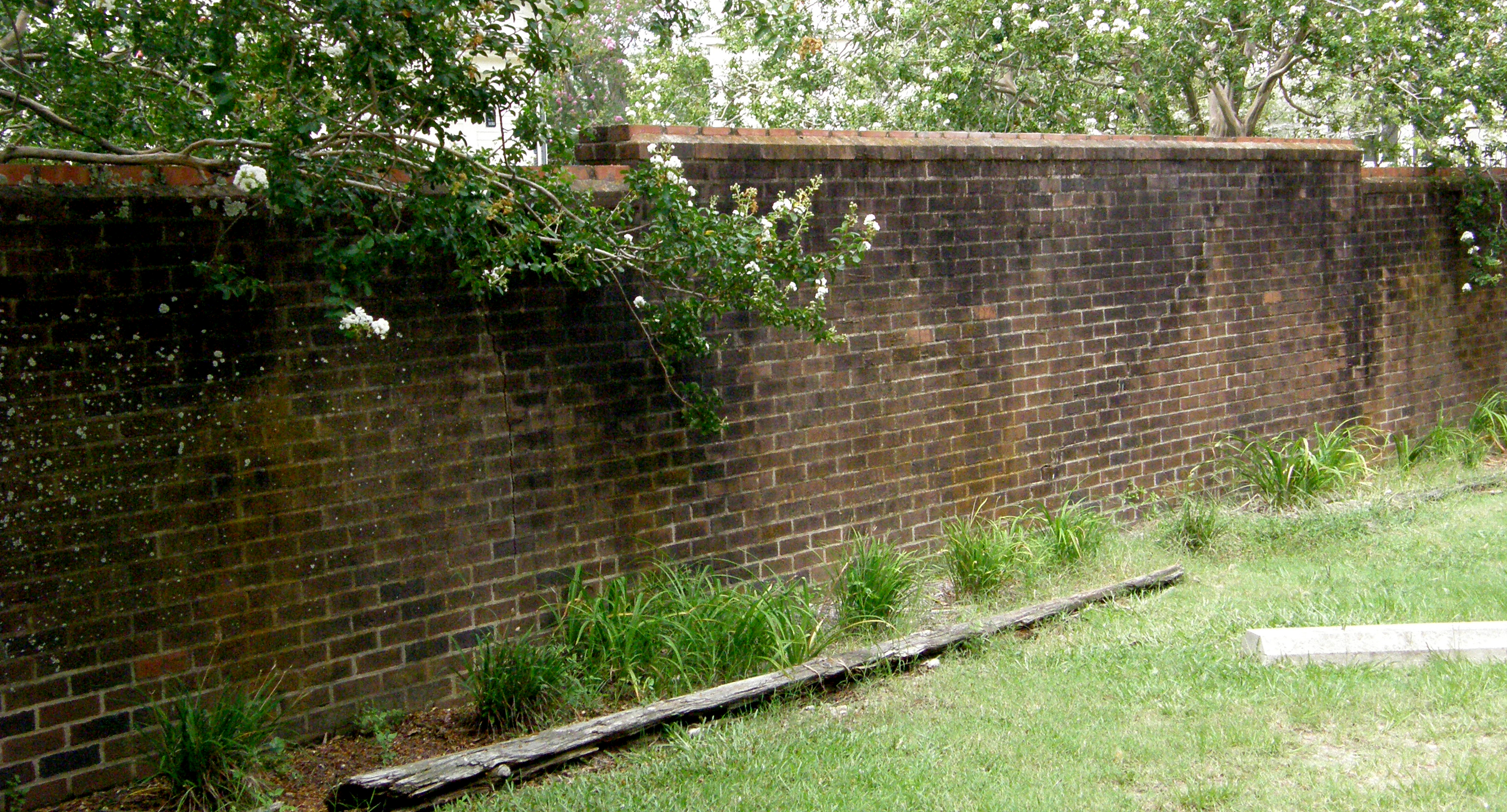
Restoration of gardens

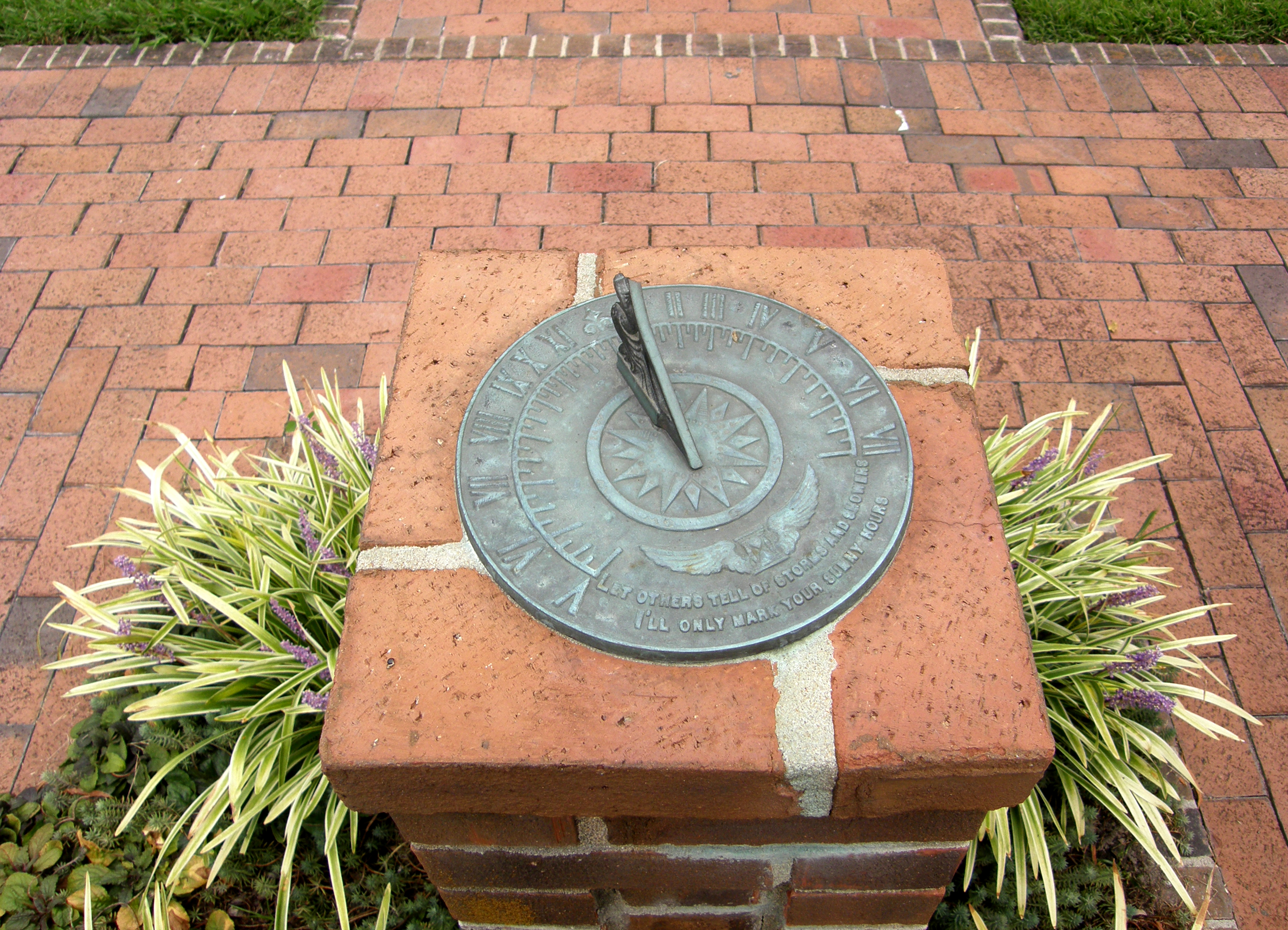
Garden Restorations

== See also ==
- Heritage Square of Fayetteville
- Market House of Fayetteville
