= Boulder Hot Springs Hotel =

- U.S. National Register of Historic Places
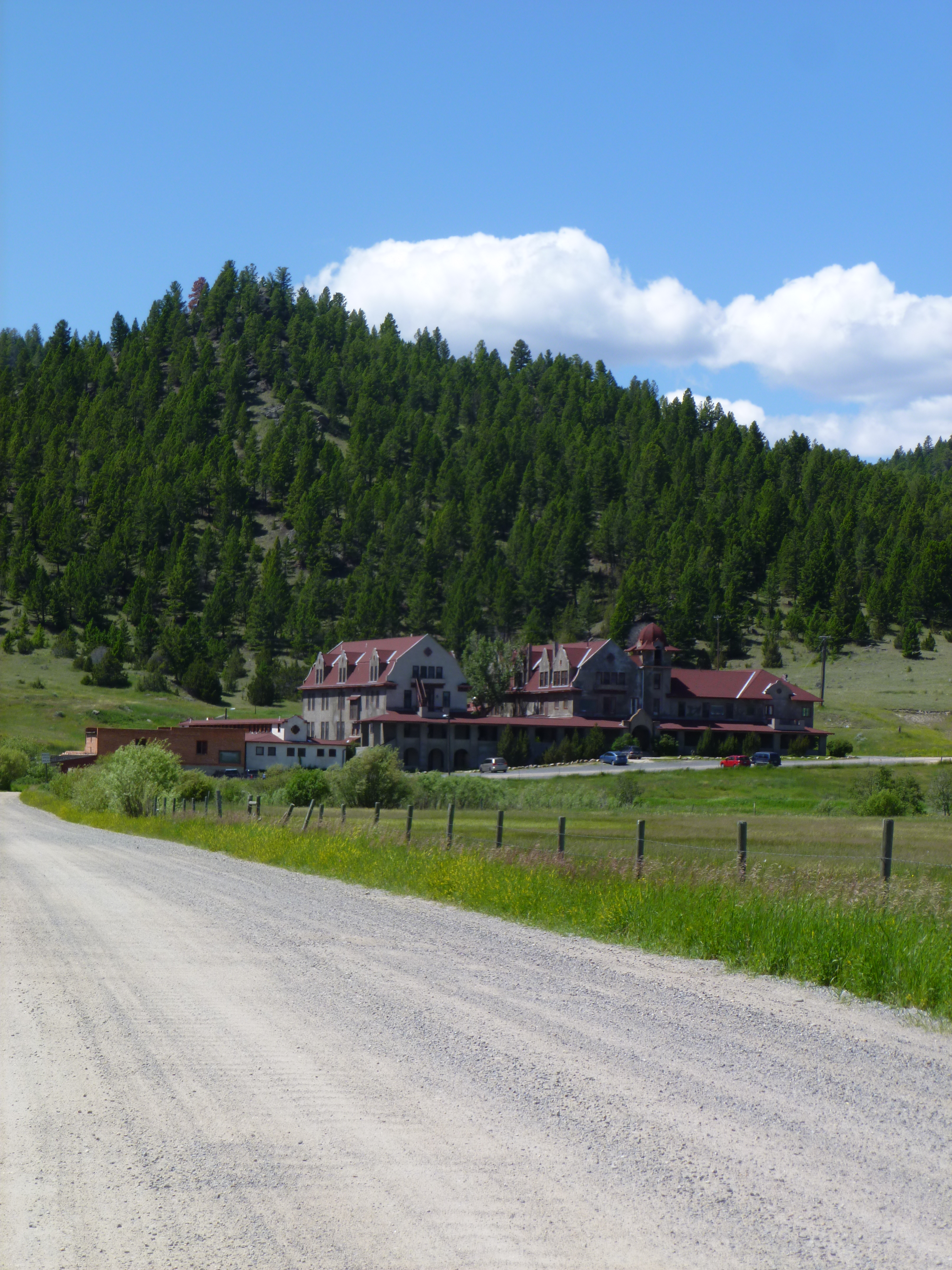

- Location within Montana Location within the United States
- Location: Southeast of Boulder, Montana on Montana Highway 69
- Coordinates: 46°12′02″N 112°05′33″W
- Area: 240 acres (0.97 km^{2})
- Built: 1883
- Built by: Quaintance, Able; Kerrick, C.W.
- Architectural style: Mission/Spanish Revival, Queen Anne
- NRHP reference No.: 79001403
- Added to NRHP: January 12, 1979

The Boulder Hot Springs Hotel is a hotel on the National Register of Historic Places located southeast of Boulder, Montana. It was added to the Register on January 12, 1979.

A 240 acres (0.97 km^{2}) area historically associated with the hotel was listed.

The building is said to be haunted by "Simone", the ghost of a prostitute who was murdered at the hotel.
