= John E.P. Daingerfield =

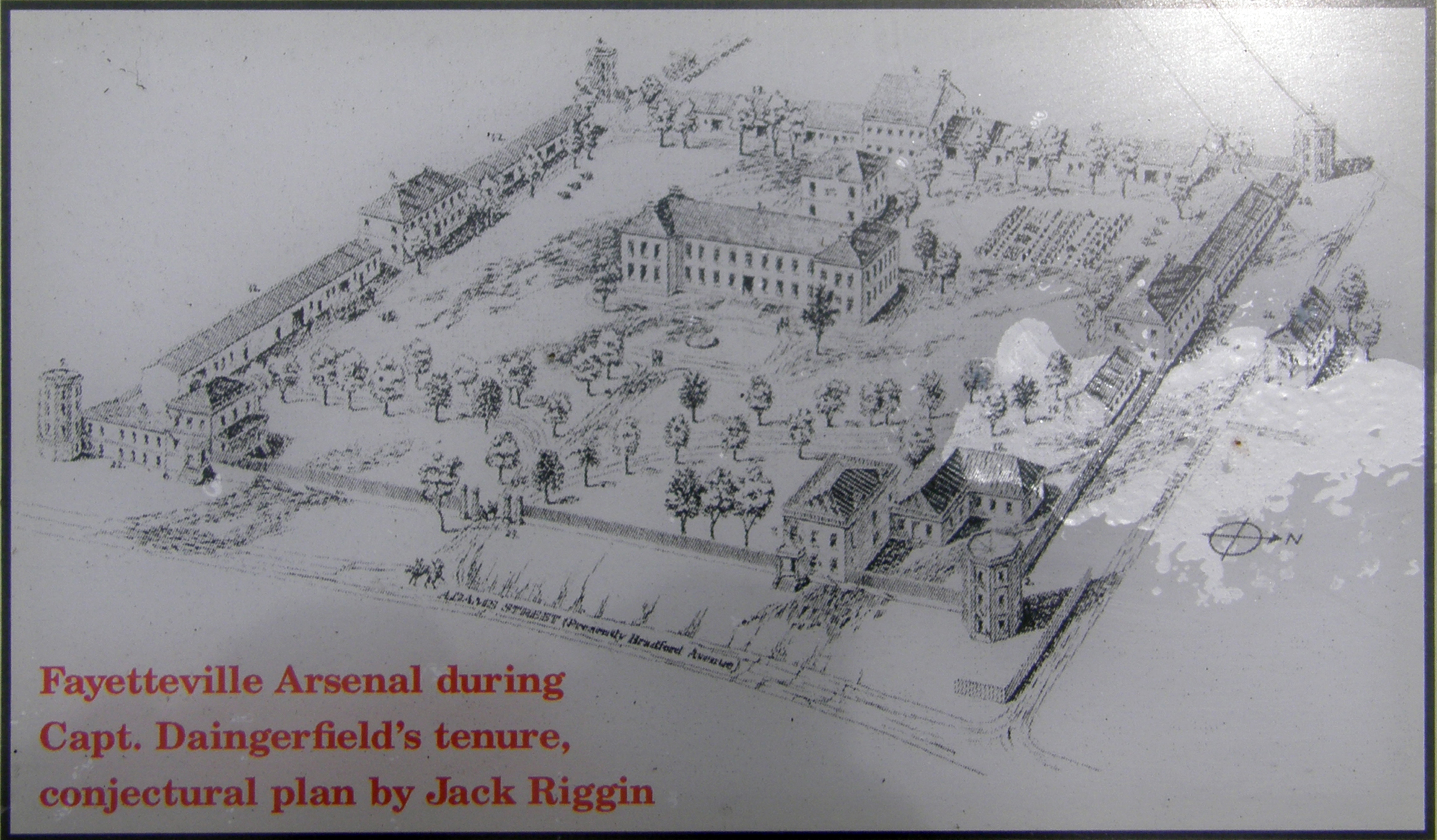
Drawing by Jack Riggins of the Fayetteville Arsenal during Captain Daingerfield's tenure

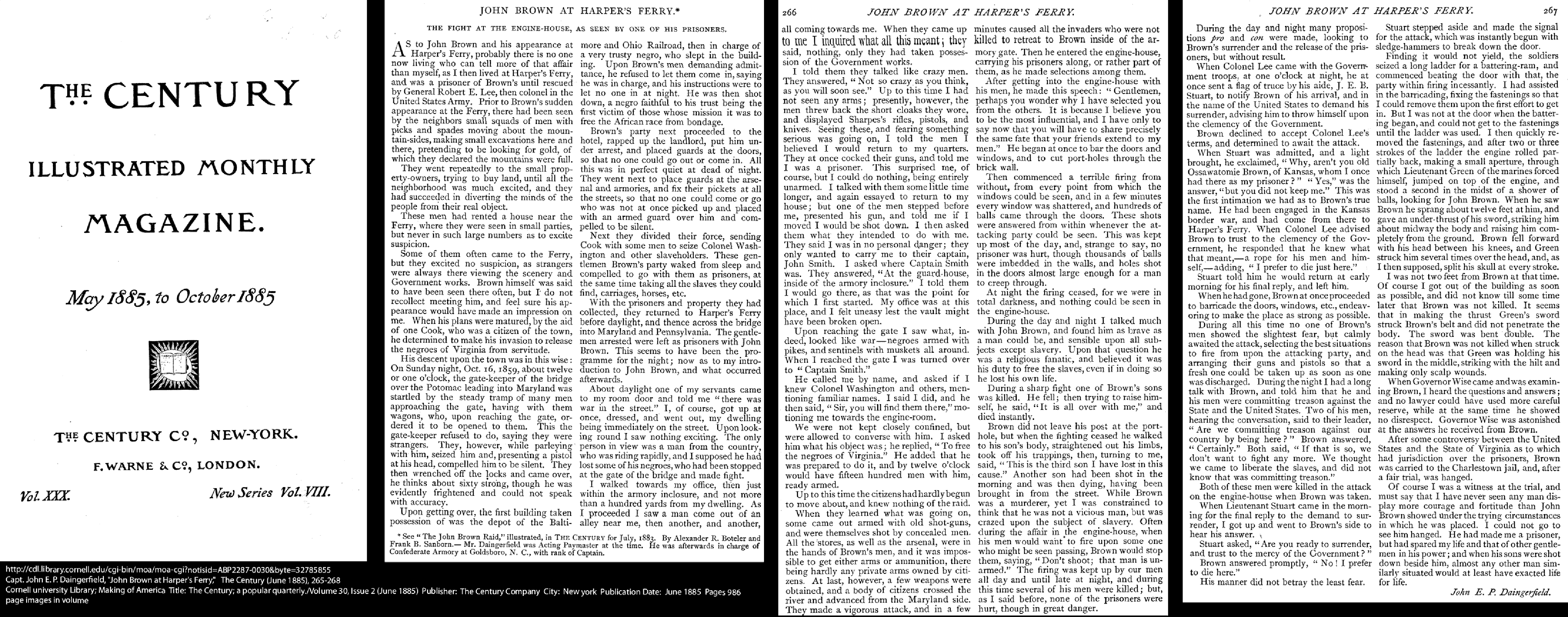
Dangerfield's account of being held prisoner at Harper's Ferry, published 1885

John E.P. Daingerfield (October 25, 1817–October 10, 1889) was Acting Paymaster at the Harpers Ferry Armory at the time of John Brown's 1859 Raid; he was taken hostage but not injured.

On June 10, 1861, Daingerfield joined the Confederate States Army with the rank of captain. He was transferred to Fayetteville, North Carolina, as munitions and manufacturing equipment were moved to the Fayetteville Arsenal from Harpers Ferry that same year.

Maj. John C. Booth, commanding officer at the Fayetteville Arsenal, appointed him military paymaster and storekeeper, prestigious jobs in the Army. Daingerfield served in the 2nd Battalion Local Defense Troops, commonly referred to as the Arsenal Guard.

In June 1885, The Century Magazine published Captain Daingerfield's article "John Brown at Harper's Ferry" giving an account of the incident from a prisoner's standpoint.

In 1873, Daingerfield moved into a home currently maintained at its original location in Heritage Square with his wife Matilda and their four children. Their son, Elliot Daingerfield, became a celebrated painter in North Carolina.
