= USS Epperson =

Gearing-class destroyer

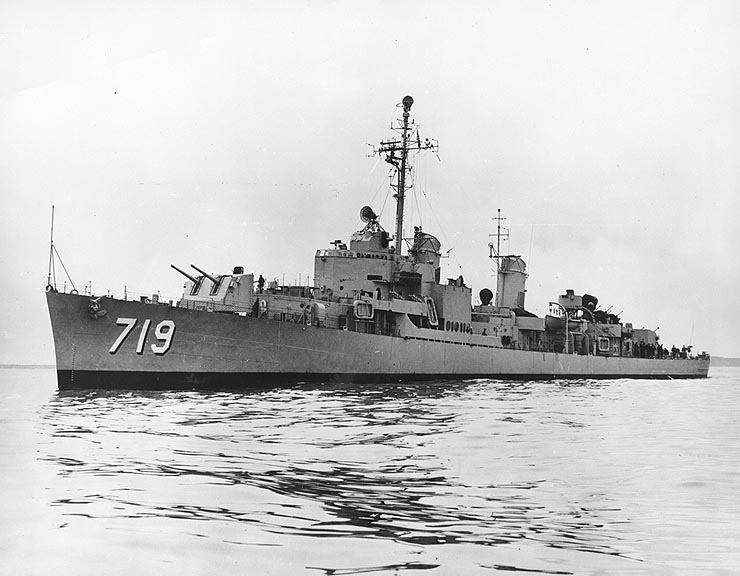
- USS Epperson (DD-719) in 1949

History

United States
- Name: USS Epperson (DD-719)
- Namesake: Harold G. Epperson
- Builder: Federal Shipbuilding and Dry Dock Company, Kearny, New Jersey
- Laid down: 20 June 1945
- Launched: 22 December 1945
- Commissioned: 19 March 1949
- Reclassified: DDE-719, 28 January 1948; DD-719, 30 June 1962
- Stricken: 30 January 1976
- Identification: Callsign: NTGT; Hull number: DD-719
- Honors and awards: 5 battle stars (Korea)
- Fate: Transferred to Pakistan, 29 April 1977

Pakistan
- Name: PNS Taimur
- Namesake: Taimur
- Acquired: 29 April 1977
- Decommissioned: 1999
- Nickname(s): Timmy
- Fate: Sunk as a target, March 2000

General characteristics
- Class & type: Gearing-class destroyer
- Displacement: 3,460 long tons (3,516 t) full
- Length: 390 ft 6 in (119.02 m)
- Beam: 40 ft 10 in (12.45 m)
- Draft: 14 ft 4 in (4.37 m)
- Propulsion: Geared turbines, 2 shafts, 60,000 shp (45 MW)
- Speed: 35 knots (65 km/h; 40 mph)
- Range: 4,500 nmi (8,300 km) at 20 kn (37 km/h; 23 mph)
- Complement: 336
- Armament: 6 × 5"/38 caliber guns; 12 × 40 mm AA guns; 11 × 20 mm AA guns; 5 × 21 inch (533 mm) torpedo tubes; 6 × depth charge projectors; 2 × depth charge tracks

USS Epperson (DD/DDE-719) was a Gearing-class destroyer of the United States Navy. It was named for United States Marine Corps Private Harold G. Epperson (1923–1944) who was posthumously awarded the Medal of Honor for his heroism in the Battle of Saipan.

Epperson was launched on 22 December 1945 at the Port Newark yard by Federal Shipbuilding and Dry Dock Co. of Kearny, New Jersey; sponsored by Mrs. J. B. Epperson, mother of Private Epperson. Epperson was placed in mothballs and towed to Bath Iron Works in December 1946. Epperson was redesignated DDE-719 on 28 January 1948; completed by Bath Iron Works Corp., Bath, Maine; and commissioned on 19 March 1949.

== Service history ==
Epperson conducted training along the east coast; on 10 December 1949 she arrived at Key West for intensive antisubmarine warfare exercises. On 22 August 1950 Epperson sailed for Pearl Harbor, her home port, arriving on 10 September. She operated in the Hawaiian Islands with her squadron and ships of other types, and on 7 November 1950 became flagship of Commander, Escort Division 12.

Epperson sailed from Pearl Harbor on 1 June 1951 for service in the Korean War. She screened the carrier task force off Korea, patrolled and bombarded the coast, and joined in hunter-killer exercises off Okinawa before returning to Pearl Harbor on 14 November. Her second Korean tour, from 10 November 1952 to 29 May 1953, found her performing similar duty, as well as patrolling the Taiwan Straits, and entering the dangerous waters of Wonsan Harbor to bombard enemy shore batteries.

During the first 4½ months of 1954, Epperson patrolled in the Marshall Islands during thermonuclear weapons tests, and in June sailed for duty in the Far East once more, an annual part of her employment schedule through 1962. In 1958 and 1959, her western Pacific cruises included visits to Manus, ports in Australia and New Zealand, and Pago Pago, American Samoa.

The USS Epperson served in Vietnam making a “West Pac Cruise” every year from 1962 until 1973.She worked in task forces with carriers, carried out shore bombardment, and picketed off North Korea.

Epperson's classification reverted to DD-719 on 30 June 1962.

Epperson was stricken from the Naval Vessel Register on 30 January 1976.

== Pakistan service ==
The ship was transferred to Pakistan on 29 April 1977, and served in the Pakistani Navy as PNS Taimur. The first commanding officer was Commander Syed Sajjad Haider. Under his command PNS Taimur was reconditioned at Naval Base San Diego and also underwent upgrading at Subic Bay Philippines.

Taimur was decommissioned in 1999, and sunk as a target in March 2000.

== Awards ==
Epperson received five battle stars for Korean War service.
