= Elliott Daingerfield =

American painter (1859–1932)

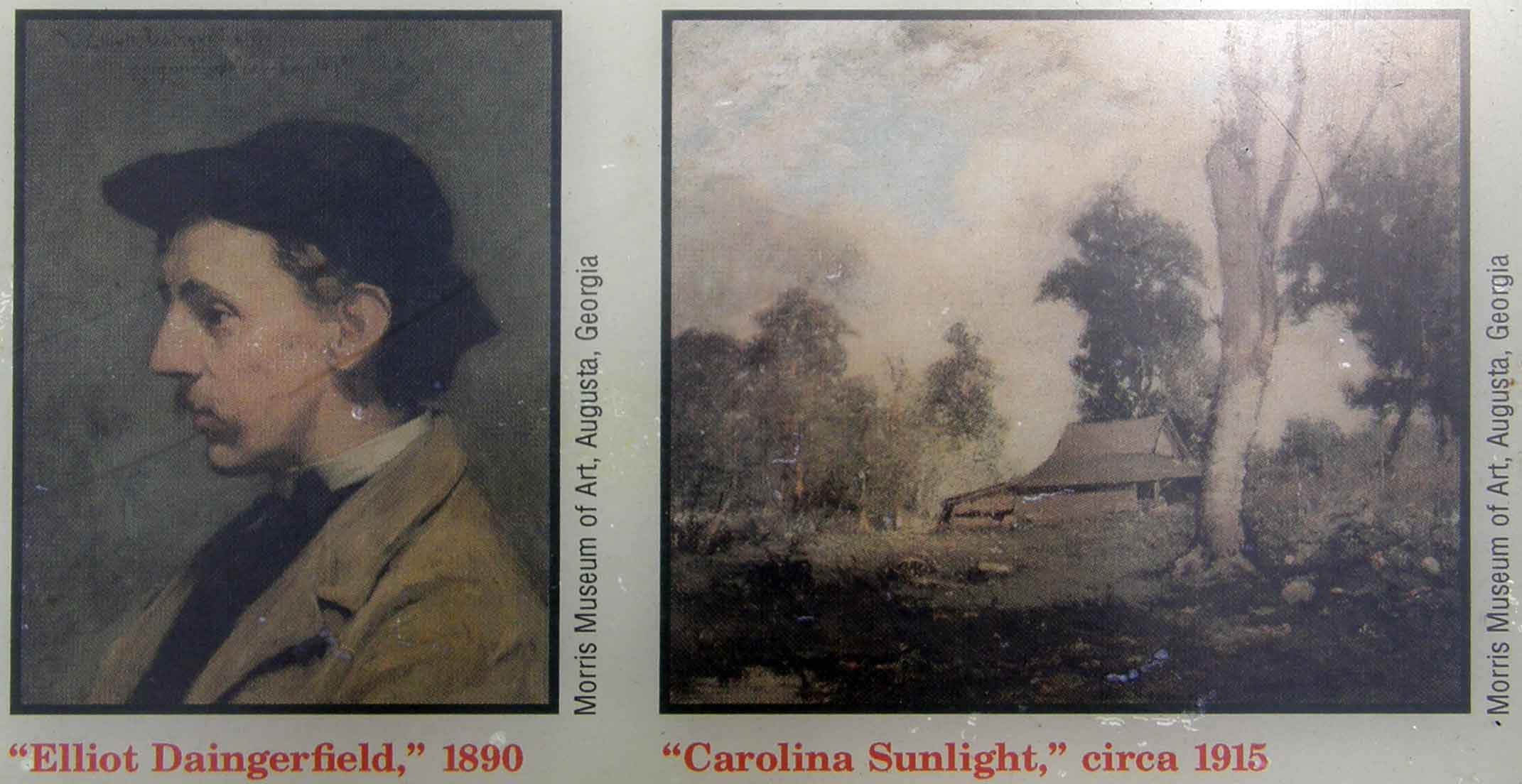
Elliott Daingerfield portrait and "Carolina Sunset"

Elliott Daingerfield (March 26, 1859–1932) was an American artist who lived and worked in North Carolina. He is considered one of North Carolina's most prolific artists.

Elliott, the son of a captain in the Confederate Army, was born in Harpers Ferry, West Virginia, and raised in Fayetteville, North Carolina. At 21, he moved to New York to study art and was apprenticed under Walter Satterlee in 1880. He became an instructor in Satterlee's still life class and studied at the Art Students' League.

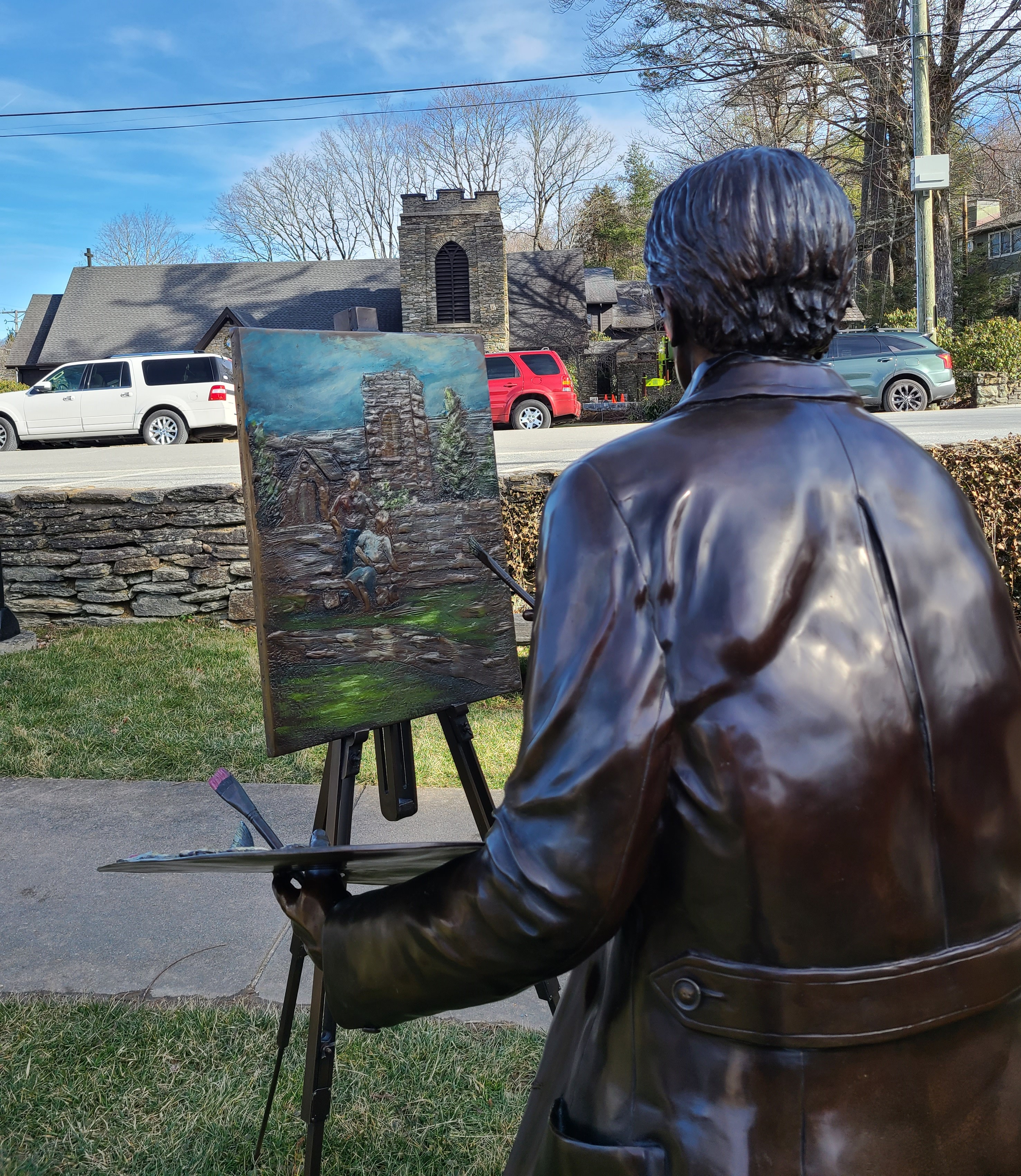
Elliott Daingerfield statue outside the Blowing Rock Art & History Museum

In 1884, Daingerfield left Satterlee and met George Inness. The works of Inness, Albert Pinkham Ryder, and Kenyon Cox "inspired his visionary style", according to the art historian Stephanie J. Fox. Daingerfield was also influenced by the European Symbolists whose work he encountered during his time studying in Europe c. 1897. In the late 1890s he achieved recognition for paintings of religious subjects, an example of which is his mural in the Church of Saint Mary the Virgin in New York City. In 1902, he was elected into the National Academy of Design as an associate member; he became a full member in 1906.

Daingerfield wrote a number of articles on art, including the essay "Nature versus Art" published in 1911 in Scribner's Magazine. He published a biography of George Inness in 1911, and a biography of Ralph Albert Blakelock in 1914. Daingerfield traveled to the American West in 1911 and 1913, and made seven paintings of the Grand Canyon.

He married twice. His first wife, Roberta Strange French, died during childbirth in 1891. His second wife, Anna Grainger (married 1895), bore two daughters named Gwendoline and Marjorie.

Elliott Daingerfield died in Manhattan on October 22, 1932, and is buried in Cross Creek Cemetery at Fayetteville.

In 1971, the North Carolina Museum of Art displayed 200 of Daingerfield's paintings; the museum owns "Grand Canyon" and "Evening Glow."

Heritage Square in Fayetteville exhibits Daingerfield's teenage home. The Sandford House showcases the South Parlor as "The Daingerfield Room" and displays Daingerfield's painting "Angel of Beauty."

His first home, Edgewood Cottage, still stands as a tribute. The second is a private residence. His third summer home and studio Westglow was listed on the National Register of Historic Places in 1979.

== Gallery ==
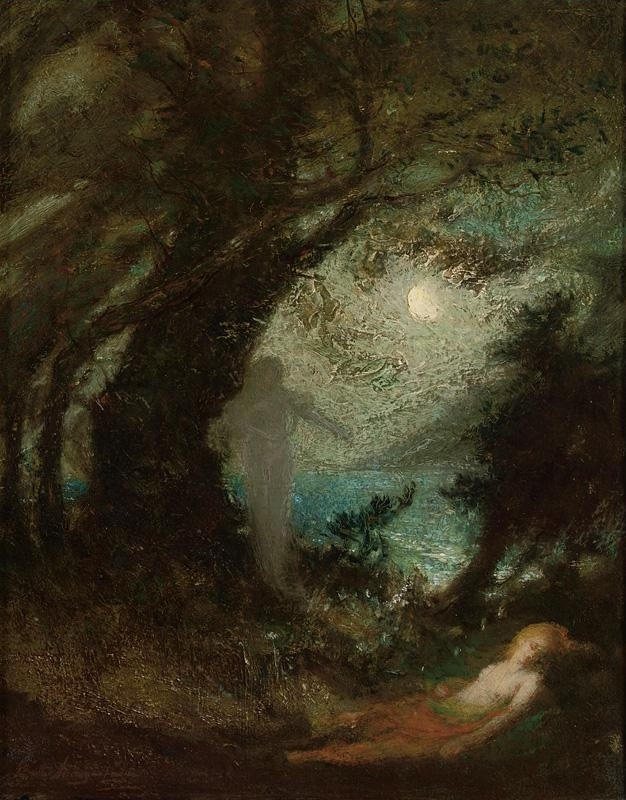
"Spirit of the Night"

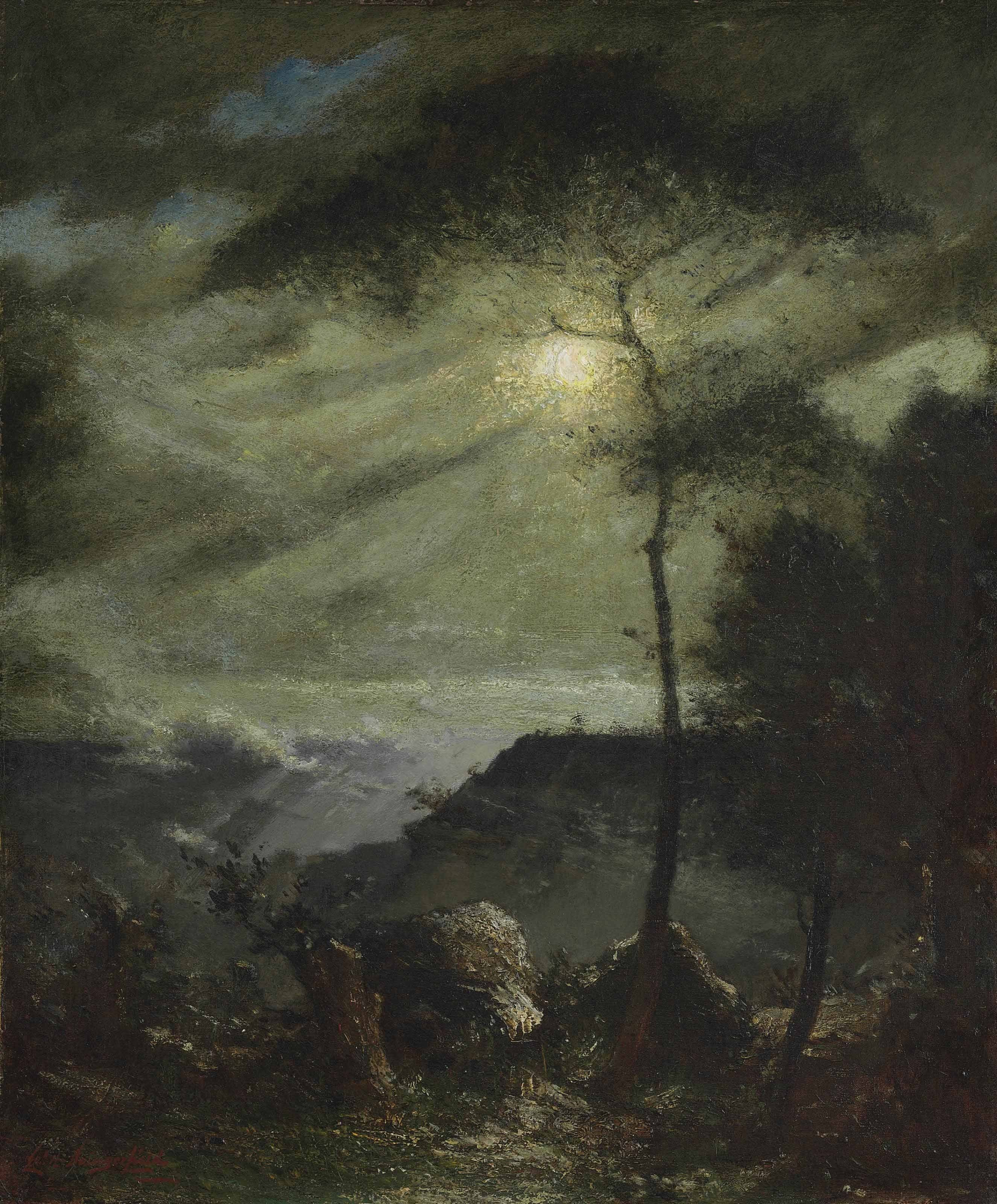
"Grand Canyon, Moonlight"

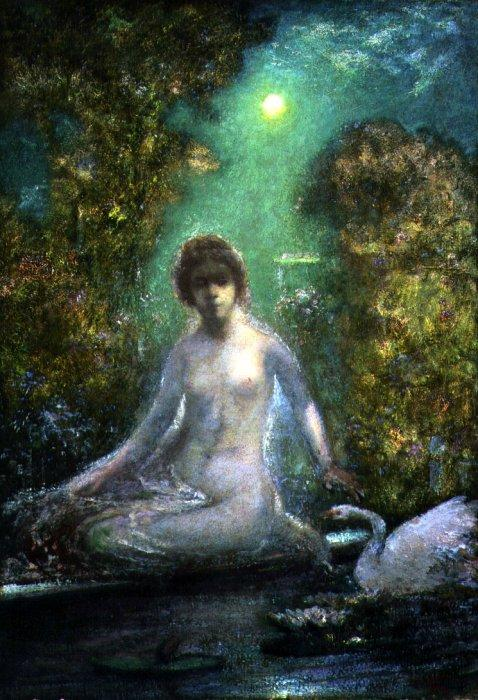
"Leda and the Swan"

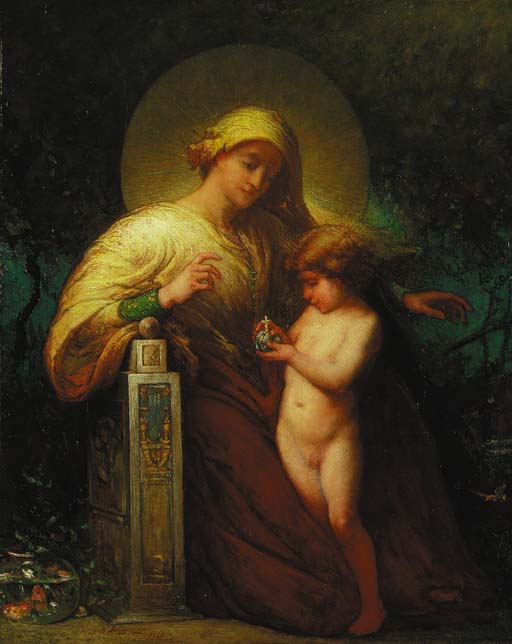
"Madonna and Child" c.1914

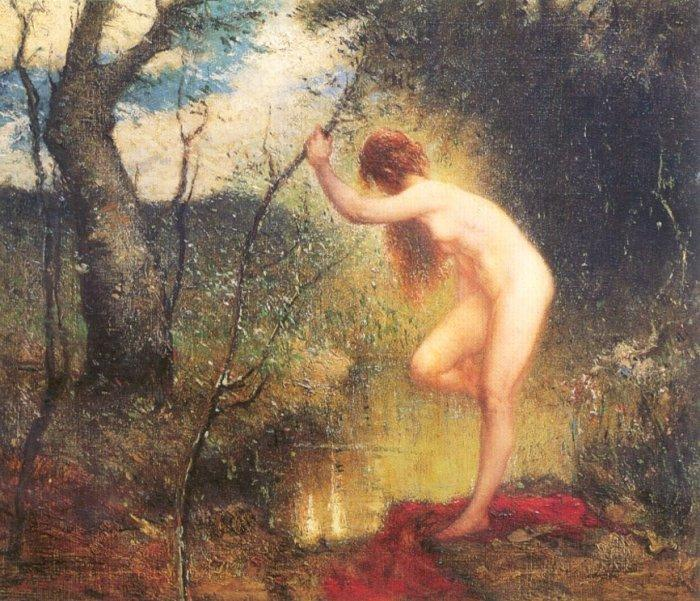
"The Forest Pool" c.1915

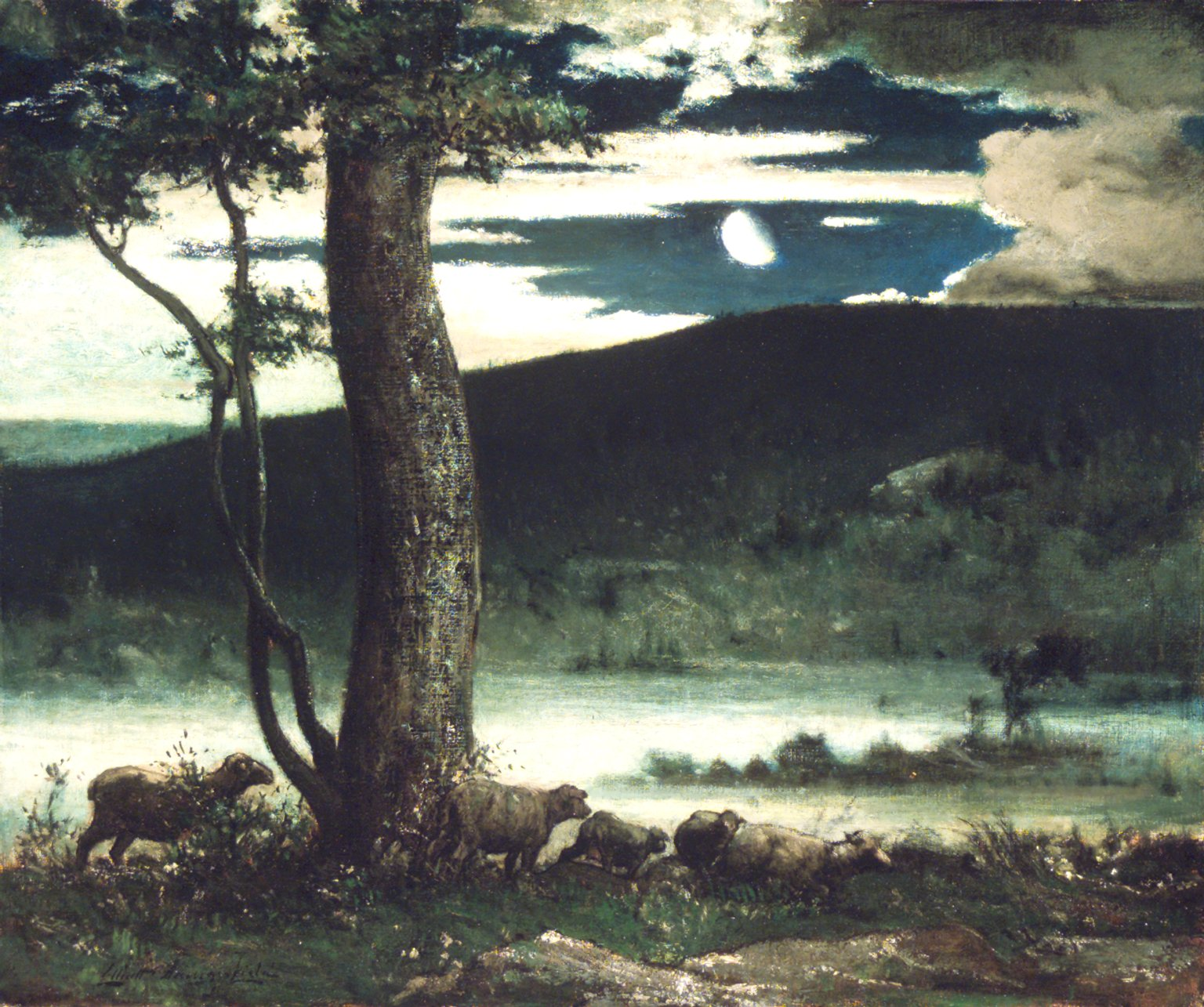
"Midnight Moon"

== See also ==
- John E.P. Daingerfield
