= Epperson Lagoon =

American tourist attraction in Florida

Epperson Lagoon is a human-made tourist attraction located in Wesley Chapel, Florida, consisting of a 7.5-acre (3.0 ha) human-made lake and beach featuring clean, clear, purified water, and known as the first crystalline lagoon in the United States. The lagoon features a beach, swim-up bar, water slide, climbing wall, kayak and paddleboard rentals, and an entertainment pavilion with a stadium-sized LED screen.

The 16-million-US-gallon (61,000,000 L; 13,000,000 imp gal) body of water utilizes advanced systems and sensors to monitor water quality, including physicochemical indicators. The mechanical and hydraulic systems to clean and pump water are controlled through a cloud-based control center. Water to fill the lagoon was purchased from the Pasco County government, and limited to a rate of 100,000 US gallons (380,000 L; 83,000 imp gal) a day to prevent stress on aquifers or cause sinkholes from rapid depletion of the ground water table.

Epperson Lagoon is the central feature in a planned housing development consisting of approximately 1,500 homes; homeowners and daily use fees support the maintenance and management of the lagoon. The lagoon is open to the general public for a daily use fee.

The lagoon is manufactured by Crystal Lagoons USA, headquartered in Dallas, Texas and Miami, Florida.
