= Heritage Square (Fayetteville, North Carolina) =

Historic house in North Carolina, United States

- Fayetteville Women's Club and Oval Ballroom
- U.S. National Register of Historic Places
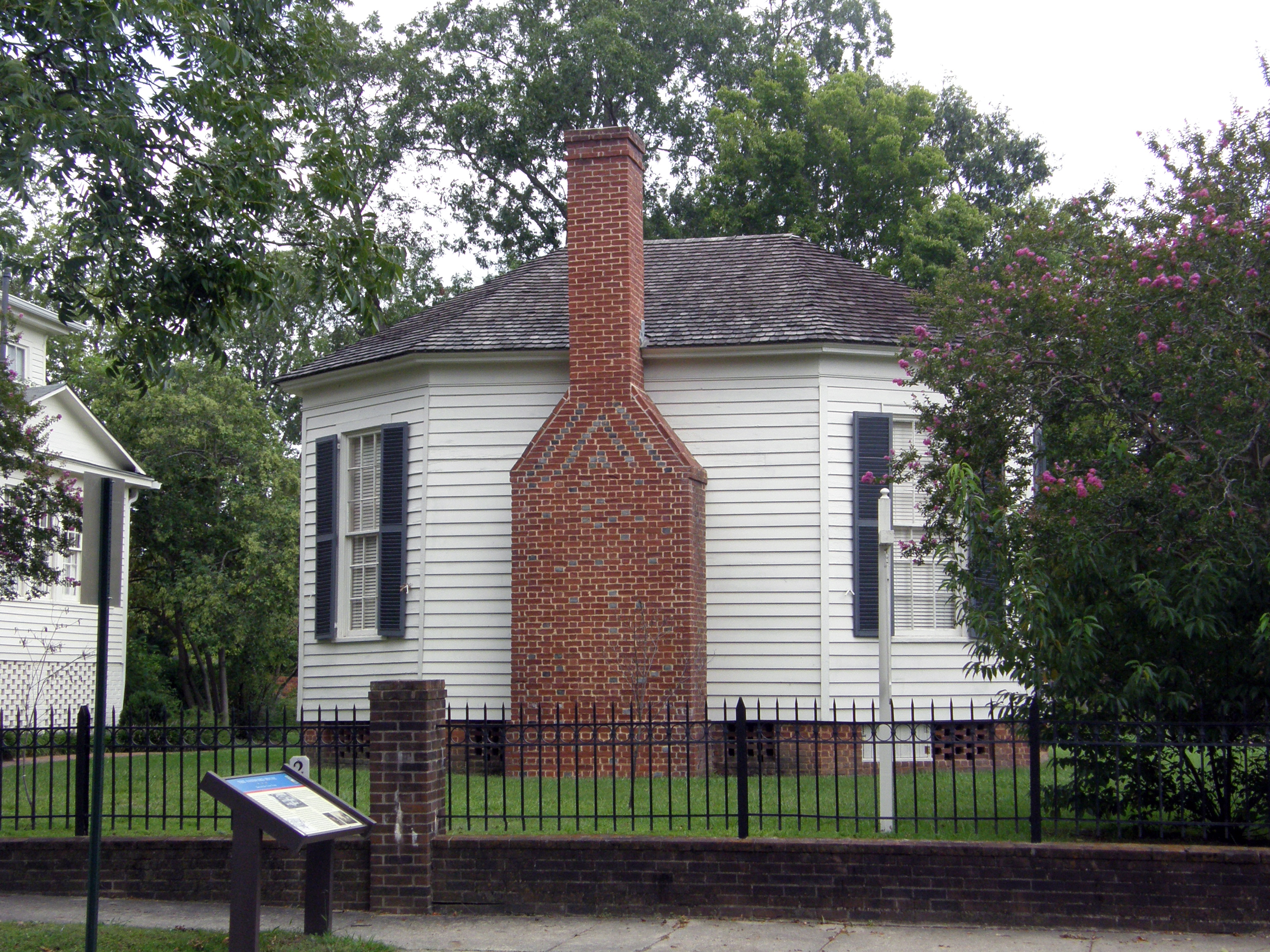
- The Oval Ballroom from Dick Street

- Location within North Carolina Location within the United States
- Location: 224 Dick St., Fayetteville, North Carolina
- Coordinates: 35°2′53″N 78°52′42″W
- Area: 1 acre (0.40 ha)
- Built: 1798
- Architectural style: Federal
- NRHP reference No.: 73001330
- Added to NRHP: February 6, 1973

Heritage Square is a place in Fayetteville, North Carolina. Owned and maintained by The Woman's Club of Fayetteville, Heritage Square includes the Sandford House, built in 1797; the Oval Ballroom, a freestanding single room built in 1818; and the Baker-Haigh-Nimocks House, constructed in 1804. The buildings located on Heritage Square are listed in the National Register of Historic Places as the "Fayetteville Woman's Club and Oval Ballroom" and "Nimocks House."

== Sandford House ==
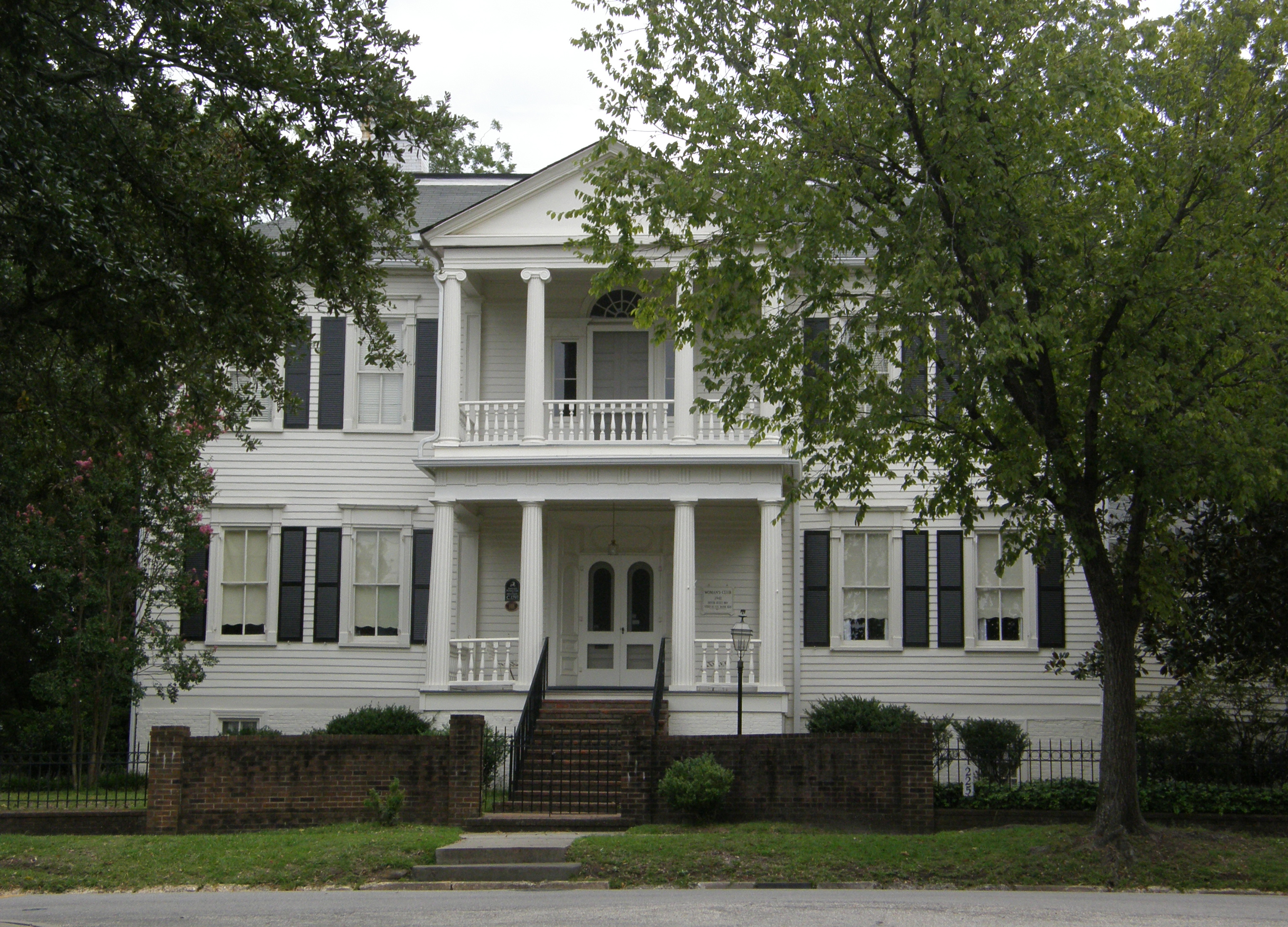
Sandford House, built 1797

The Sandford House, built in 1797, is the showcase home of Heritage Square. The Woman's Club of Fayetteville purchased the home in 1946, and currently maintains and furnishes the Sandford House in keeping with its Antebellum roots. The Sandford House exhibits classic Colonial (Georgian) architecture. Its interior features eight spacious rooms divided by hallways and ornamented with exquisite mantles, doorways and moldings. The exterior wears trim of a hand carved rope design under the eaves.

=== Historical ownership of the Sandford House ===
- Mark Russel originally owned the land on which the house stands.
- John McLeran built the home.
- Duncan McLeran purchased the home from John, his kinsman. Duncan McLeran was one of the first elders of the historic Presbyterian Church in Fayetteville.
- In 1804, John Adam purchased the home. Sarah Donaldson Adam, John's wife, also links to the Presbyterian Church because her father donated the land on which the church was built.
- In 1820, under new ownership, the Sandford House was transformed into the first federal bank in North Carolina.
- In 1832, John William Sandford (the current namesake and former Philadelphian) purchased the building and made it a home with Margaret Halliday, his new wife. According to local legend, Sherman's troops used the house as barracks during the Union occupation of Fayetteville in March 1865. "The Civil War Trail" runs through the backyard of the Sandford House today.
- In 1873, former Confederate Captain John E.P. Daingerfield purchased the home. Elliot Daingerfield, John's son and renowned North Carolina artist, lived here throughout his teenage years.
- Around 1897, A.H. Slocumb (of Massachusetts), husband of Lillian Taylor (a Fayetteville belle) purchased the home. A.H. Slocumb worked in Fayetteville's naval stores with the A.E. Rankin Company.
- Around 1919, W.H. and Clara E. Walston(e) Powell, Sr. (both of North Carolina) purchased the Slocumb (now Sandford) House. The Powell's were engaged in business, civic, religious and political interests in the City of Fayetteville during this time. The Powell's and their children, Dr. William Henry Powell, Jr., Major General USAF and E. Louise Powell Varnedoe (Mrs. M.D. Varnedoe, Sr.) lived here until 1941. The Powell-Varnedoe family was the last family to privately occupy and use this house as their home.
- From 1941 to 1945, The Woman's Club of Fayetteville leased the Slocumb-Powell (now Sandford) House from The Powell-Varnedoe Family and then exercised an option to purchase the property in 1945.

==== Captain John E.P. Daingerfield ====
After the Civil War, ex-Confederate Captain John E.P. Daingerfield (originally from Arkansas) bought the property.

Daingerfield served as a clerk at the Harpers Ferry arsenal in 1859 during John Brown's raid. Captain Daingerfield took rank June 10, 1861 and transferred to Fayetteville as munitions and equipment were transferred to the Fayetteville Arsenal from Harpers Ferry that same year.

Maj. John C. Booth, commanding officer at the Fayetteville Arsenal, appointed him military paymaster and storekeeper, prestigious jobs in the Army. Daingerfield served in the 2nd Battalion Local Defense Troops, commonly referred to as the Arsenal Guard, and occupied the house with his wife Matilda and his four children - one of whom became a celebrated painter of North Carolina.

==== Elliot Daingerfield ====
Elliot Daingerfield was born in Harpers Ferry, West Virginia, and raised in Fayetteville. At age 21 he moved to New York to study art. Elliot was inspired by the European Symbolist movement during his time overseas. His influences included Impressionism and Romanticism in general and the artist Ralph Albert Blakelock. Today, the "Daingerfield Room" occupies the entire South Parlor of the Sandford House.

==== The Woman's Club of Fayetteville ====
The Woman's Club rented the Sandford House from 1941 to 1945 to provide a home for unmarried working women flooding into the city during World War II. At one time, 30 young, single women, a housemother and hostess packed the second-floor bedrooms, which were converted into dormitory-style living spaces. The Woman's Club also provided space for any other women's organization to meet in the house free of charge in an effort to accommodate the town's growing need for social outlets.

== The Oval Ballroom ==
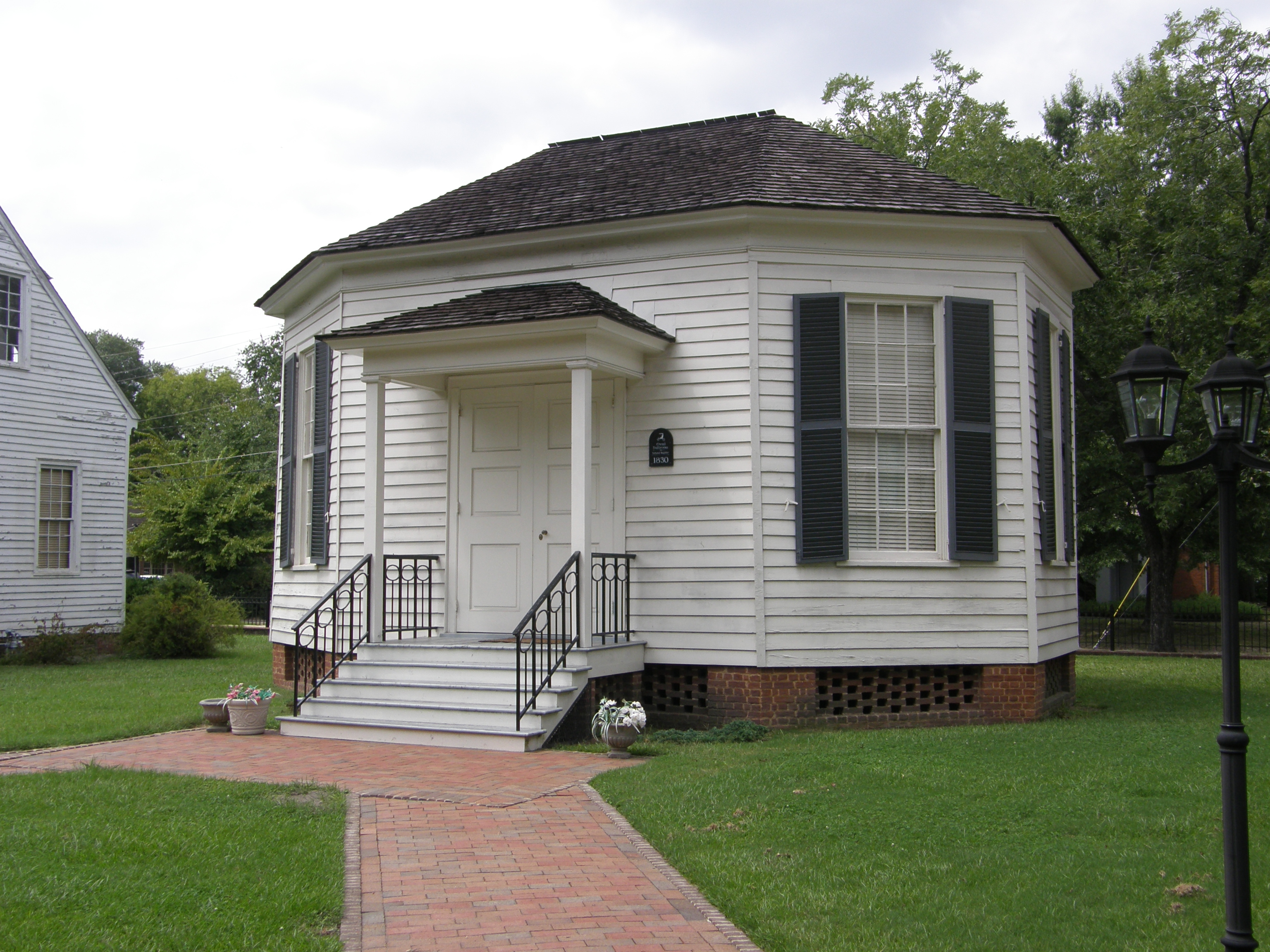
The Oval Ballroom, c.1820

The Oval Ballroom is now a freestanding room with octagonal architecture outside and a large (20-foot × 30-foot) oval interior highlighted by plaster cornices and pilasters. Originally, the ballroom was an add-on to the Halliday-Williams House in Fayetteville, North Carolina; the Halliday-Williams House was demolished in the mid-1950s. The Oval Ballroom is an example of Regency architecture.

=== Historical ownership of the Oval Ballroom ===
- Robert Halliday, an immigrant from Galloway, Scotland, built the house to which the ballroom was later attached in 1808. He lived there with his wife, Catherine (Kitty) McQueen Halliday, and their family until he died in 1816.
- Catherine married Judge John Cameron after Robert Halliday's death. The Cameron family erected two similar octagonal wings onto the home. The room on the north side of the house was built specifically for the reception and ball following the 1830 wedding of Margaret, Robert's daughter, to John Sandford. This room eventually became "The Oval Ballroom."
- In 1847, The Camerons began renting the house. One notable character, Mrs. Ann K. Simpson, occupied the home during its rental period.
- In 1870, John D. Williams purchased the house for his son, Captain Arthur Butler Williams.
- Sometime prior to 1930, Fanny Williams, Captain Butler's daughter, inherited the home. She transformed the house into The Colonial Inn which became a popular tourist stop in the 1930s.
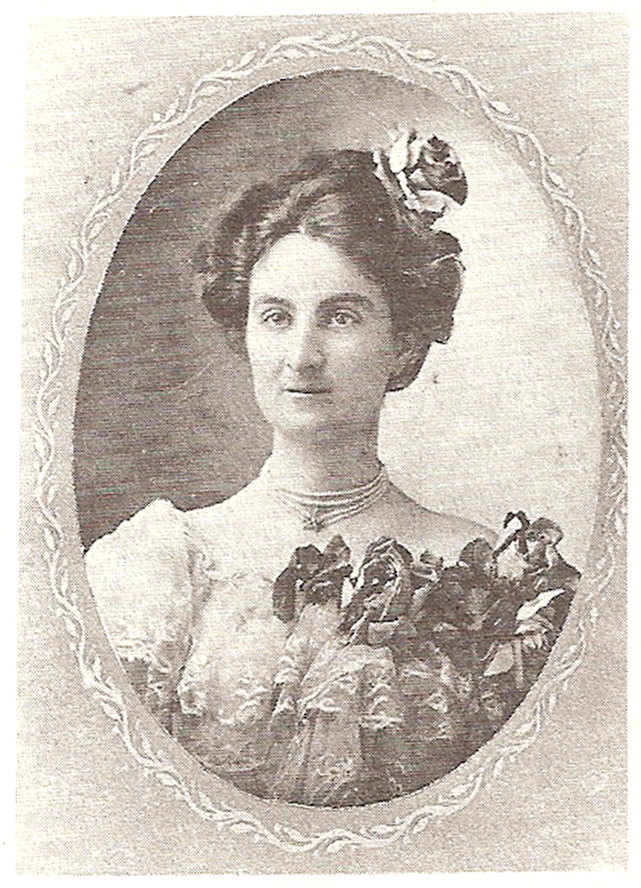
  "Fan" Williams, c.1930
- Mrs. M.B. McLean, Fanny's niece, inherited the home. She donated the Colonial Inn's "dining room" (previously the Cameron's "north room") to The Woman's Club of Fayetteville.
- In the mid-1950s, The Woman's Club of Fayetteville renamed the now freestanding room as "The Oval Ballroom" and moved it to its current location on Heritage Square.

==== Mrs. Ann K. Simpson ====
Ann K. Simpson, accused of murdering her husband, was the first woman tried for murder in Cumberland County, North Carolina. She was found not guilty in this trial. However, Ann was found guilty and executed when she stood trial for murdering her third husband while living in Minnesota. During the Minnesota trial, the early, untimely death of her second husband was also called into question. "The Oval Ballroom" is the dining area in which Ann served her first husband his (allegedly) arsenic-laced dessert of syllabub and coffee in the presence of two witnesses.

==== Fanny "Fan" Williams ====
Fan Williams operated The Colonial Inn, known for its southern cuisine and hospitality.

== Nimocks House ==
- Nimocks House
- U.S. National Register of Historic Places
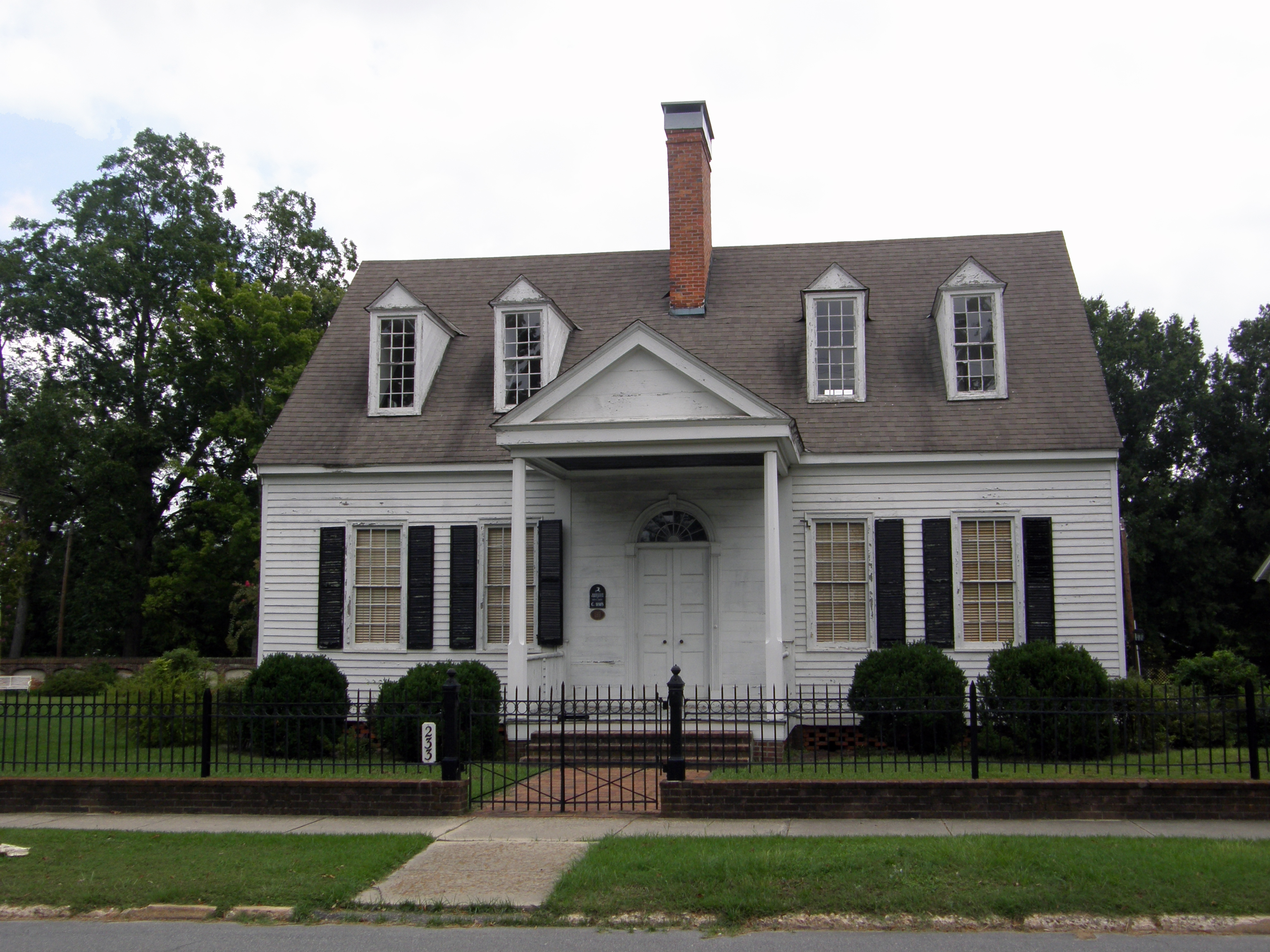
- Baker Haigh Nimocks House, built 1804

- Location within North Carolina Location within the United States
- Location: 225 Dick St., Fayetteville, North Carolina
- Coordinates: 35°3′1″N 78°52′34″W
- Area: 0.5 acres (0.20 ha)
- Built: 1804
- NRHP reference No.: 72000958
- Added to NRHP: January 20, 1972

=== Exterior ===
The Baker-Haigh-Nimocks House, built in 1804, is an example of Georgian architecture, perfectly balanced and symmetrical inside and out. The Nimocks House exhibits a proportional, classical, and "regular" style. "Regular" styles are defined by mathematical ratios (such as the golden mean) that are used to determine every measurement from the floor layout to the width to height ratio of the windows. Georgian Style homes were typically painted red, tan, and/or white if not constructed from brick or stone.

It is a 1 1/2-story, five-bay, frame dwelling. It sits on a brick pier foundation and features a one-bay-wide, one-story porch supported by Doric order columns.

=== Interior ===
New England ship builders often wintered in the south during this time period. Their unique building style probably explains the unusual barrel staircase design in the Nimocks House. In addition, the hand-carved cornices, wainscoting, mantels, and hand-punched gouge work are beautifully detailed and typical of the period.

The front entrance features a fan light, and the light fixture at the top of the staircase was planned for use in the state capital building if Fayetteville had remained the capital.

The two upstairs rooms feature dormer windows and individual fireplaces.

== Heritage Square gallery ==
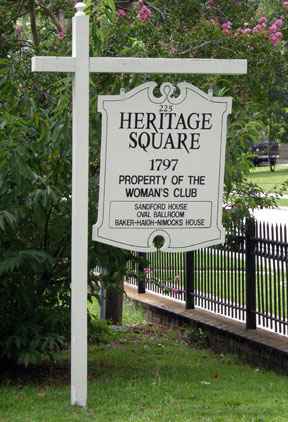

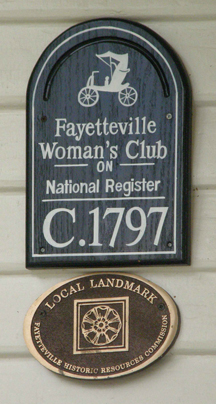
Sign placed on Sandford House designating it as a landmark

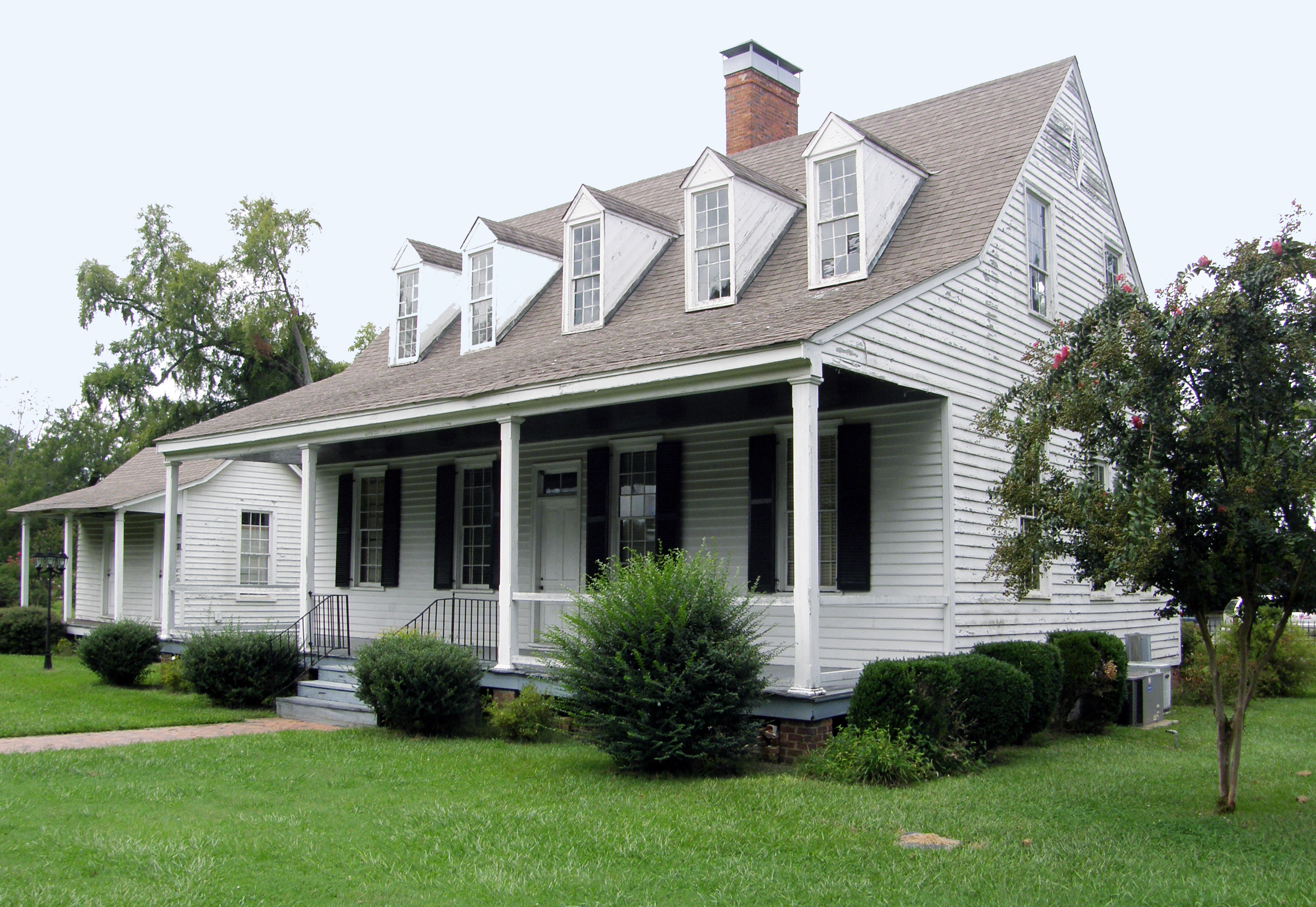
side view of Baker-Haigh-Nimocks House

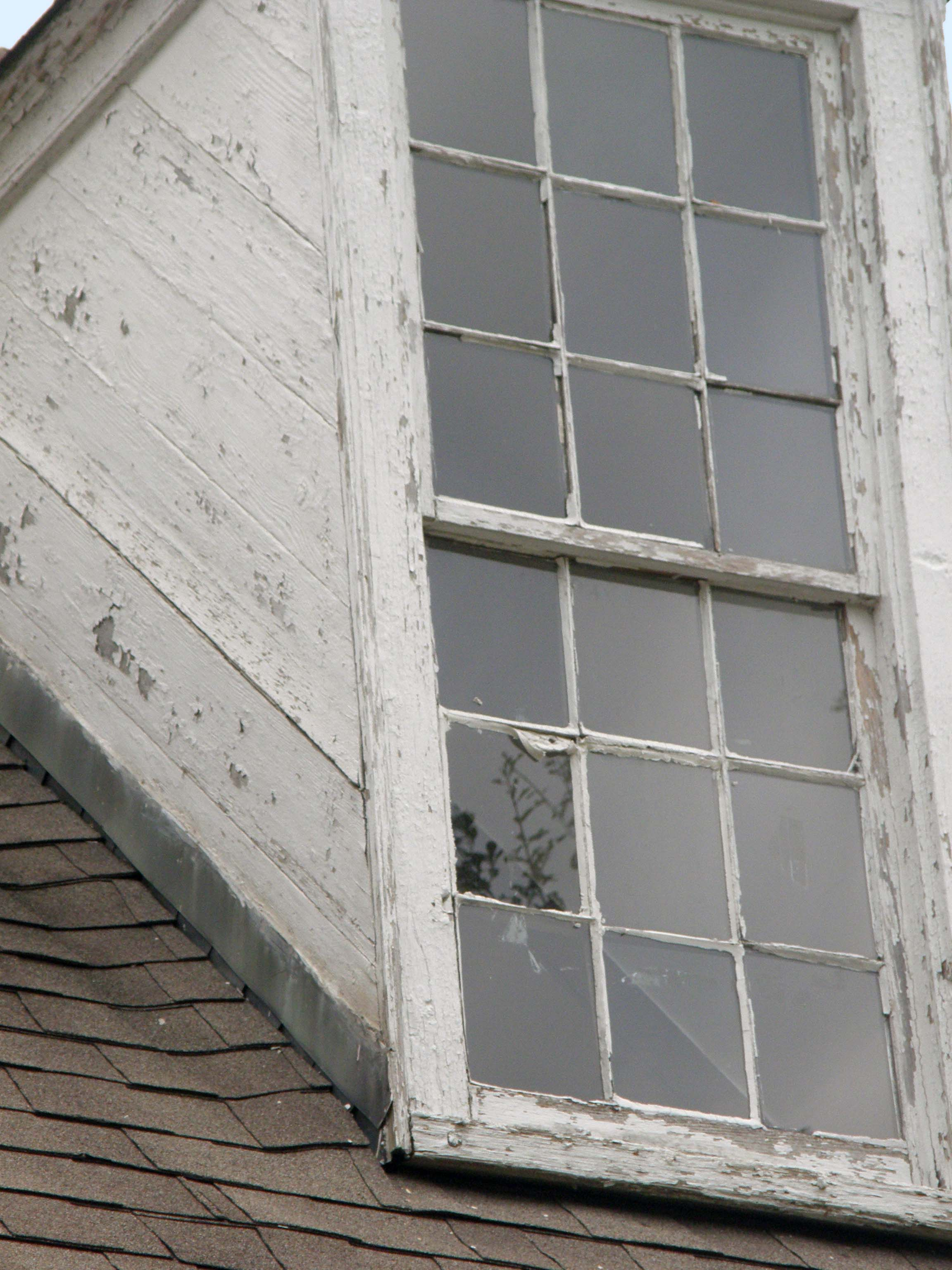
Baker-Haigh-Nimocks house (pre-restoration) upper window
