= Epperson House =

Coordinates: 39.0311°N 94.5813°W

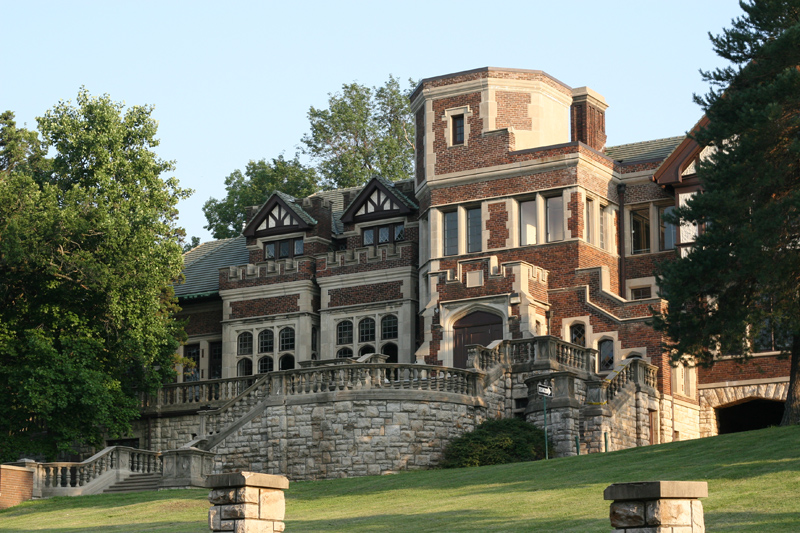
- Interactive map of the Epperson House area

General information
- Type: House
- Architectural style: Tudor-Gothic
- Location: 5200 Cherry Street; Kansas City, Missouri
- Construction started: 1919-1923
- Governing body: UMKC

Design and construction
- Architect: Horace LaPierre

The Epperson House is a historic residence located at 5200 Cherry Street in Kansas City, Missouri. The house is now part of the University of Missouri–Kansas City.

== History ==
Uriah Spray Epperson (1861-1927) hired eccentric French architect Horace LaPierre to design the monumental house. Construction on the house began in 1919 and was completed in 1923 at a cost of $450,000. The four-story Tudor-Gothic structure contained 54 rooms, including six bathrooms, elevators, swimming pool, billiard room, barbershop, a custom organ, and a tunnel linking the east and west wings.

Uriah Epperson was born in Indiana on December 22, 1861, and he came to Kansas City at the age of six. He was a banker, industrialist, and philanthropist who amassed significant wealth from insurance and meat-packing industries.

Uriah Epperson died in 1927, only four years after the completion of the house. The building was donated to the university in 1942 by Epperson's widow, and it was used as a men's dormitory until 1956. Epperson House is currently vacant and awaiting renovations.

== Hauntings ==
One legend involves the ghost of Harriet Evelyn Barse (1875-1922). Barse was an organ student at the Kansas City Conservatory of Music. Uriah and his wife, Mary Elizabeth Weaver Epperson (1855-1939), brought Barse with them when they moved into the house. They referred to her as their adopted daughter, even though no legal adoption occurred. Soon after moving into the home, Barse died on December 20, 1922, of a perforated gall bladder at the age of 47 years, before construction of the organ in the house was completed. She had designed the custom organ for the loft space of the 48-square-foot living room. The organ, built by the Reuter Organ Company of Lawrence, KS, was finally dedicated after a respectable mourning period, on Sunday, November 29, 1925. Local organist, Powell McCullough Weaver (1890-1951), no relation to Mrs. Epperson, organized the dedication recital and was assisted by local soprano, Winifrede Repp Railey (1890-1972), who was the heiress of the Duff & Repp Furniture Company, an important furniture business in the Midwest at that time which was headquartered in Kansas City. Supposedly, Uriah had a psychiatric breakdown after Barse died and murdered his wife and then killed himself inside the house, therefore entrapping all of their souls together as a family in the afterlife. (None of those events actually occurred. Uriah did not murder his wife, who in fact survived him, or commit suicide.) In the 1970s, UMKC students reported seeing Barse dressed in an evening gown as though ready for a recital. Campus security guards have also reported strange lights and the sounds of organ music at night.

In 1978, weekend guards began to hear footsteps in the empty building. The best known account of strange activity documented by security guards occurred in May 1979. A patrol officer was parked near the house when he felt another vehicle hit his from behind, followed by the sound of shattered glass. The officer got out of the car to investigate, but he found no other car, no damage, and no broken glass. His car, however, had moved eight inches, as verified by a pair of skid marks.

Some even believe that Epperson himself walks the halls. In 1978, a campus police officer reported seeing an arm in a blue suit coat materialize and turn off a light. Two officers were doing a regularly scheduled patrol of the building at 2 a.m. As they patrolled, they turned the lights on and off in the house as they walked through the various areas. One light, however, remained lit, and then the patrolman saw an arm clothed in a blue suit reach out and claw at the switch. The arm and hand then disappeared into the darkness as the light went out.
