= WCCG =

Hope Mills, North Carolina; United States
- Broadcast area: Fayetteville, North Carolina
- Frequency: 104.5 MHz
- Branding: WCCG 104.5 - "The Hip Hop Station"

Programming
- Format: Mainstream Urban

Ownership
- Owner: Dr James E Carson

History
- First air date: April 16, 1997

Technical information
- Licensing authority: FCC
- Facility ID: 17529
- Class: A
- ERP: 6,000 watts
- HAAT: 84 meters
- Transmitter coordinates: 34°56′34″N 78°51′41″W

Links
- Public license information: Public file; LMS
- Webcast: Listen live
- Website: wccg1045fm.com

WCCG is an American radio station licensed to broadcast to Hope Mills, North Carolina on FM frequency of 104.5 MHz with 6,000 watts of power, and serving the Fayetteville, North Carolina area. The station is programmed with a Mainstream Urban music format and carries Yung Joc & The Streetz Morning Takeover. It is locally owned and operated by Dr. James E. Carson, Carson Communications. Its studios are located in downtown Fayetteville, just less than one block south of Market House, and its transmitter is located east of Hope Mills.

== History ==
The 104.5 frequency was allocated in 1986. Among the applicants were John Dawson of WQSM. Dr. James Carson, a former Fayetteville State University vice chancellor, applied with the FCC in 1987 and was awarded a construction permit three years later. On April 16, 1997, WCCG signed on with commercial-free classical music performed on a piano. The station was not yet at full power.

"The Vibe" began broadcasting at 6000 watts June 19, 1997 with "Love and Happiness" by Al Green. The format was classic R&B with such artists as Marvin Gaye, the Supremes, the Shirelles, Brook Benton, Wilbert Harrison, Rick James, Ruth Brown, James Brown, and Ike and Tina Turner. Ron Scurry was morning host, and Tracey Vee, another DJ, went by the name "TV on Your Radio." WFLB was the area's other oldies station.

On November 13, 2000, The Vibe stopped playing older music except on Saturdays, switching to a mix of current R&B and 80s and 90s hits but no rap, intending to reach a younger audience. B. B. Holland, "Bam-Bam" from WRCQ, became the new host of "Wake Up Shake Up." Sonny Pagan, formerly of WKQB, was the new operations manager. The change gave The Vibe its best ratings ever.

In October 2002, WCCG played James Brown's "The Payback" for several days, leading to rumors of a format change. One woman nearly called 911, fearing someone was holding the station hostage. Although Carson denied any change was coming, WCCG was soon calling itself "Hot 104.5" and playing more rap.

In 2005, WCCG dropped the morning show "240 Degrees of Therapy" and replaced it first with music and then with Steve Harvey (who was replaced in 2009).

Jose "Chico" Vargas hosted a Spanish language show, "Caliente 104.5," on WCCG during 2003 but was fired for offensive comments about a woman he considered a friend. Spanish-language programming returned on Sunday afternoons August 20, 2006, with "Domingo Tropical," including news, Reggaeton, salsa, merengue and Latin jazz. Also, afternoon host Vic Frost was replaced with Michael Baisden, and the station dropped its old school rap programming for a younger audience.

WCCG promotes Production Manager, Kalim Hasan to Program Director in 2006, becoming the youngest Urban AC Program Director in the South Eastern US. Under the direction of Kalim Hasan, WCCG has gravitated to a larger younger listening audience, 24-hour live on-air jocks and mix shows, and a more diverse play list including new music by artists such as; B.O.B, Roscoe Dash, Drumma Boy, Tyga, French Montana, and more.

WCCG began playing Old School Rap music on September 21, 2009. After that it play Hip Hop and R&B and in 2011 they switched their name WCCG FM 104.5 "The Hip Hop Station" and picked up Big Bruce in the morning for 2 years, then in 2011 WCCG began playing the Rickey Smiley Morning Show.

WCCG launches the largest FREE community Hip Hop and R&B concert in Fayetteville, North Carolina, which is held every 4th Friday of July, every year since 2004: dubbed, "The Soul Summer Music Festival in 2009" - Then changed the title of the concert to "The Summer Music Festival in 2010"
