= WFNC =

WFNC can refer to:

- WFNC (AM), a radio station at 640 AM licensed to Fayetteville, North Carolina
- WFNC-FM, a radio station at 102.3 FM licensed to Lumberton, North Carolina
