= Interstate 295 (North Carolina) =

Highway in North Carolina

Interstate 295
- Fayetteville Outer Loop
- I-295 highlighted in red

Route information
- Auxiliary route of I-95
- Maintained by NCDOT
- Length: 33.3 mi (53.6 km)
- Existed: 2019–present
- History: First segment opened in 2003 with no designation; in 2011 it was established as NC 295; in 2019 it officially became I-295. Completed in 2025.
- NHS: Entire route

Major junctions
- South end: I-95 near Parkton
- US 401 in Fayetteville; All American Freeway in Fayetteville; NC 24 / NC 87 / NC 210 in Fayetteville; US 401 in Fayetteville
- North end: I-95 / US 13 in Eastover

Location
- Country: United States
- State: North Carolina
- Counties: Robeson, Cumberland

Highway system
- Interstate Highway System; Main; Auxiliary; Suffixed; Business; Future; North Carolina Highway System; Interstate; US; State; Scenic
← NC 294	→ US 301

Interstate 295 (I-295), also known as the Fayetteville Outer Loop, is an Interstate-grade 33.3-mile-long (53.6 km) bypass around the western side of Fayetteville, North Carolina, United States. It stretches from I-95 near Parkton to I-95 and US 13 near Eastover.

== Route description ==
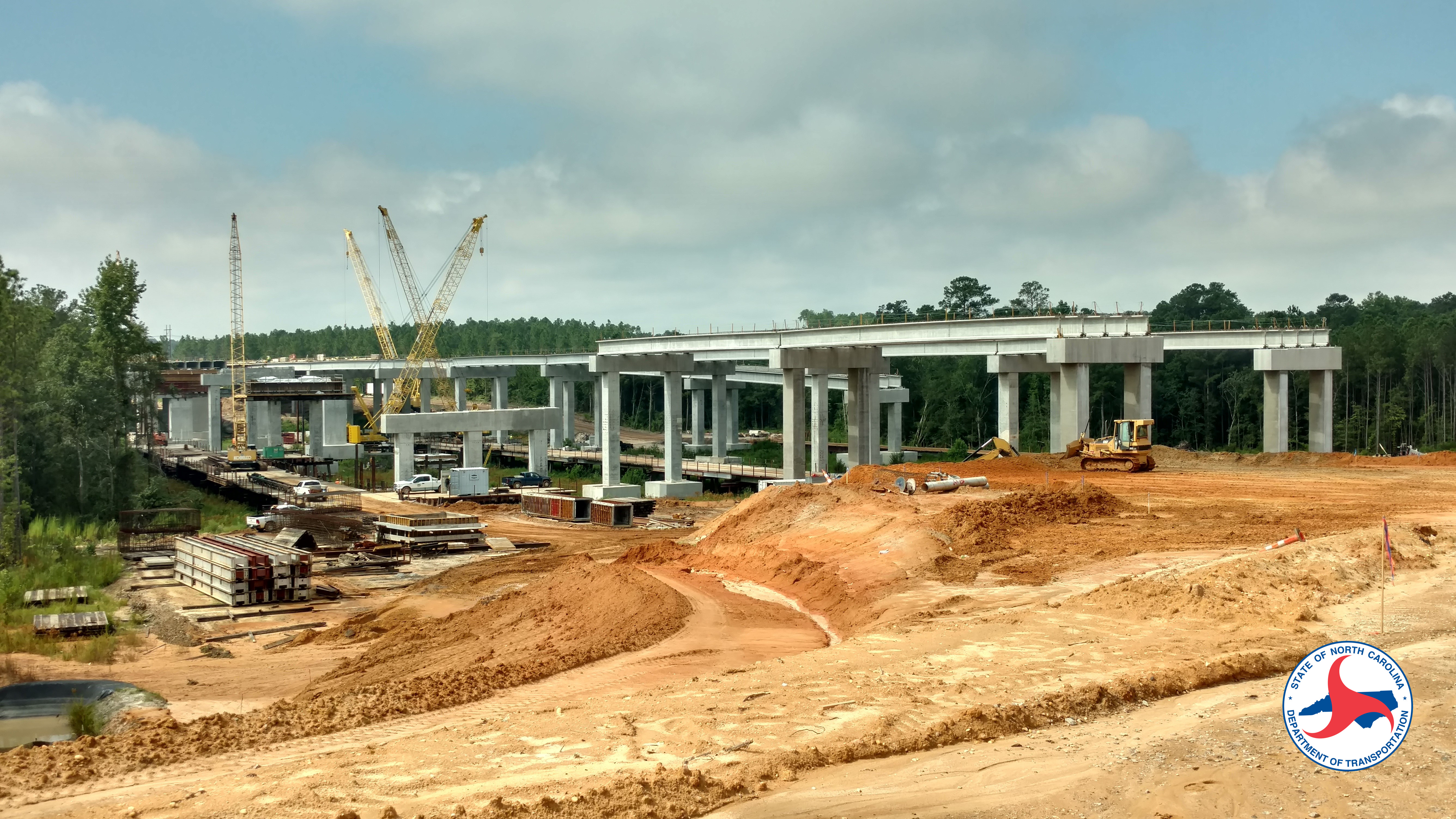
Construction of I-295 south of Raeford Road, 2020

I-295 begins at a trumpet interchange at I-95 in Robeson County between Parkton and Hope Mills. The highway heads northwest, having a dumbbell interchange at Parkton Road (exit 2) before crossing into Cumberland County. Passing over the CSX Railway's South End Subdivision and Brisson Road on a bridge, the highway then curves to the north, having another dumbbell interchange at Black Bridge Road (exit 4). The highway briefly continues north before curving west around Upchurches Pond before having a diamond interchange with Camden Road (exit 7). The highway curves north again, having a diamond interchange with Strickland Bridge Road (exit 11), crossing over the Aberdeen and Rockfish Railroad, having a single-point urban interchange with US 401 at Raeford Road (exit 12), and having a partial cloverleaf interchange with Cliffdale Road (exit 15) before turning northeast and having a partial cloverleaf interchange with Canopy Lane (exit 18). The highway then runs along the southeastern boundary of Fort Bragg, having a partial cloverleaf interchange with the All-American Freeway (exit 21A-B), Bragg Boulevard (exit 21C), and Murchison Road (exit 23). The 1.3-mile (2.1 km) between Bragg Boulevard and Murchison Road is concurrent with NC 24 and NC 87. Heading further northeast, the highway briefly turns north and has a partial cloverleaf interchange with McArthur Road (exit 25) before turning east. Continuing east, the highway has another single point interchange with US 401 at Ramsey Street (exit 28), crossing the Norfolk Southern Railway's VF-Line, crossing the Cape Fear River, having a partial cloverleaf interchange with River Road (exit 30), and crossing the CSX Railway's South End Subdivision again, before ending at an interchange with I-95/US 13 (exit 34) near Eastover. The entire 33.3-mile (53.6 km) route is a divided four-lane highway with a maximum speed limit of 65 mph (105 km/h). Exit numbers along the route match NC 295 milemarkers added in 2014 when previous signage designating the route Future I-295 were removed and replaced with NC 295 signs, both along the loop itself and at the loop's interchange with I-95.

=== Dedicated and memorial names ===
I-295 has two dedicated stretches of freeway.

- The Airborne and Special Operations Highway: Official North Carolina name of I-295 from I-95 to Raeford Road. Approved in July 2014 and dedicated on August 16, 2014, at the Airborne & Special Operations Museum.
- Lyndo Tippett Highway: Official North Carolina name of I-295 from I-95 to Ramsey Street. Approved May 2019 and dedicated on October 10, 2019.

== History ==
The future designation of the Fayetteville Outer Loop as I-295 was approved by the American Association of State Highway and Transportation Officials (AASHTO) in May 2005 following an earlier approval by the Federal Highway Administration (FHWA). Signs designation "Future I-295" were put up along the route when the section between I-95 and River Road was opened in July 2005. The first short section of this highway had opened earlier in June 2003, and it extended only from River Road to US 401. Then, the only mentions of a highway number were on street signs at the entrance ramps that said I-295 (with an additional "FUTURE" on some). In May 2019, the FHWA officially added the then open 14.3 miles (23.0 km) of NC 295 to the Interstate Highway System, this follows up on approval by AASHTO late 2018. The North Carolina Department of Transportation (NCDOT) may have received a waiver since two parts of it (namely the bridge that crosses the Cape Fear River and its interchange with I-95) are not quite up to Interstate Highway standards.

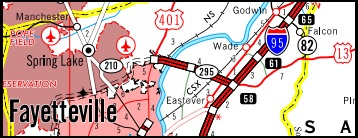
NC 295 appears in the 2013–2014 State Transportation Map

Construction on the next section of I-295, located from US 401 to the All American Freeway, was scheduled to start in the later months of 2008, and then probably completed by early 2012, but this construction project was put on hold in November 2008 due to the severe shortage of money for highway construction in North Carolina at that time and extending though 2011. Instead of constructing this segment as one contract, work was split up into three smaller segments. Work first started in 2009 on the section from Bragg Boulevard (NC 24) to Murchison Road (NC 210) using federal stimulus monies. This was completed in 2014. In March 2011, a contract to construct the portion of the loop between US 401 and Murchison Road was awarded to a construction company; however, this did not include final paving. The contract for paving was issued in 2014 and is scheduled to be completed during mid-2016, delayed from April 2014.

On August 4, 2014, a 1.3-mile (2.1 km) new section of the Fayetteville Outer Loop opened between Murchison Road and Bragg Boulevard. Considered critical in relieving congestion around Fort Bragg, this section traverses eastbound along collector–distributor lanes between the two exits, while westbound uses an actual stretch of the freeway. Signage along this stretch reflected a rerouting of NC 24/NC 87. On August 11, 2016, a 5.3-mile (8.5 km) new section opened between Murchison Road and Ramsey Street, connecting the two existing segments of the Fayetteville Outer Loop together. Another segment continuing the Loop to All American Freeway was opened on December 2, 2016.

The remainder of the route from All American Freeway south to I-95 near Parkton is to be completed in segments, with construction starting between 2018 and 2020 with the loop not scheduled to be totally complete until around 2025. Governor Pat McCrory announced in December 2015 that the remaining segments would now be funded under changes to the state's method of apportioning transportation funds. These changes were approved by the NCDOT Board in January 2016. On November 25, 2019, a 5.4-mile (8.7 km) segment opened between the All American Freeway and Cliffdale Road. On August 19, 2020, a 2.5-mile (4.0 km) segment between Cliffdale Road and US 401 (Raeford Road) was opened to traffic. On November 21, 2022, a 2.2-mile (3.5 km) orphaned segment between Parkton Road and Black Bridge Road signed as NC 295 opened to traffic. The final contract, which covered the route between US 401 and Camden Road, was awarded to Civil Branch in the summer of 2022. Construction of this segment has begun with NCDOT setting the completion date to May 15, 2026. Once this segment opens, I-295 would be completed in its entirety. The first part of this section, between Black Bridge Road and Camden Road, as well as between Parkton Road and I-95 South, opened to traffic on July 10, 2024. On November 25, 2025, the final 5.2-mile (8.4 km) segment between Camden Road and Raeford Road opened to traffic, thus completing the Fayetteville Outer Loop in its entirety.

=== Route number changes ===
North Carolina Highway 295
- Location: Fayetteville–Eastover
- Length: 14.3 mi (23.0 km)
- Existed: July 2011–January 2019

The Fayetteville Outer Loop has had a variety of actual and proposed highway designations over the years. Its first proposed Interstate designation, rejected by AASHTO in 2003, was I-195. Other earlier designations have included extensions of US 13 (in some newspaper articles) or as NC 24. It was signed as Future I-295 from 2005 to 2014, which also appeared on state maps from 2006 to 2012.

On July 23, 2011, NCDOT designated the Fayetteville Outer Loop as NC 295. The circumstances for the rule change cited was necessary for public safety and welfare. This marks its official establishment, six years after the first section of the new freeway was completed. On January 15, 2019, the FHWA approved the I-295 designation between All American Freeway and I-95/US 13 after NCDOT completed two design changes that were acceptable. Effective that same day, NC 295 was decommissioned in favor of I-295.

North Carolina Highway 295
- Location: Fayetteville
- Length: 5.4 mi (8.7 km)
- Existed: April 2020–August 2020

On April 21, 2020, NC 295 was reestablished in an encore designation between Cliffdale Road (Secondary Road 1400 [SR 1400]) and All American Expressway (SR 1007). The reason for its reintroduction is that Interstate designations must end at a National Highway System route. Lasting only a few months, it officially changed over to I-295 on August 17, 2020, upon connection to US 401 (Raeford Road).

North Carolina Highway 295
- Location: Parkton–Hope Mills
- Length: 5.9 mi (9.5 km)
- Existed: November 2022–November 2025

The 2.2-mile (3.5 km) orphaned segment of highway opened on November 21, 2022. It was signed as NC 295 per signage at the Parkton Road interchange. On July 10, 2024, a section between Parkton Road and I-95 South was opened to traffic. This included a section from Camden Road to Black Bridge Road, bringing the total length to 5.9 miles (9.5 km).

== Exit list ==
County	Location	mi	km	Exit	Destinations	Notes
Robeson		0.0	0.0	1	I-95 – Benson, Lumberton	Southern terminus; I-95 exit 38
Robeson		1.2	1.9	2	Parkton Road	
Cumberland		3.4	5.5	4	Glenn Road	Formerly Black Bridge Road.
Cumberland		5.9	9.5	7	Camden Road	
Cumberland	Fayetteville	9.6	15.4	11	Strickland Bridge Road	
Cumberland	Fayetteville	11.1	17.9	12	US 401 (Raeford Road) – Raeford, Fayetteville	Single-point urban interchange
Cumberland	Fayetteville	13.6	21.9	15	Cliffdale Road	
Cumberland	Fayetteville	17.1	27.5	18	Canopy Lane	
Cumberland	Fayetteville	19.0	30.6	21	All American Freeway – Fort Bragg Main Gate	Signed as exits 21A (south) and 21B (north)
Cumberland	Fayetteville	19.7	31.7	21C	NC 24 east / NC 87 south (Bragg Boulevard)	Eastern end of NC 24 and southern end of NC 87 concurrency
Cumberland	Fayetteville	21.0	33.8	23	NC 24 west / NC 87 north / NC 210 (Murchison Road) – Spring Lake	Western end of NC 24 concurrency and northern end of NC 87 concurrency; to Fayetteville State University and Simmons AAF
Cumberland	Fayetteville	23.8	38.3	25	McArthur Road	Signed as exits 25A (south) and 25B (north)
Cumberland	Fayetteville	26.3	42.3	28	US 401 (Ramsey Street) – Lillington, Fayetteville	Single-point urban interchange; to Methodist University
Cumberland		29.4	47.3	30	River Road	
Cumberland	Eastover	33.3	53.6	34	I-95 – Benson, Lumberton	Northern terminus; I-95 exit 58
Cumberland	Eastover	33.3	53.6	—	US 13 north – Newton Grove, Goldsboro	Continuation as US 13
1.000 mi = 1.609 km; 1.000 km = 0.621 mi: Concurrency terminus
