= Eastover, North Carolina =

- Town
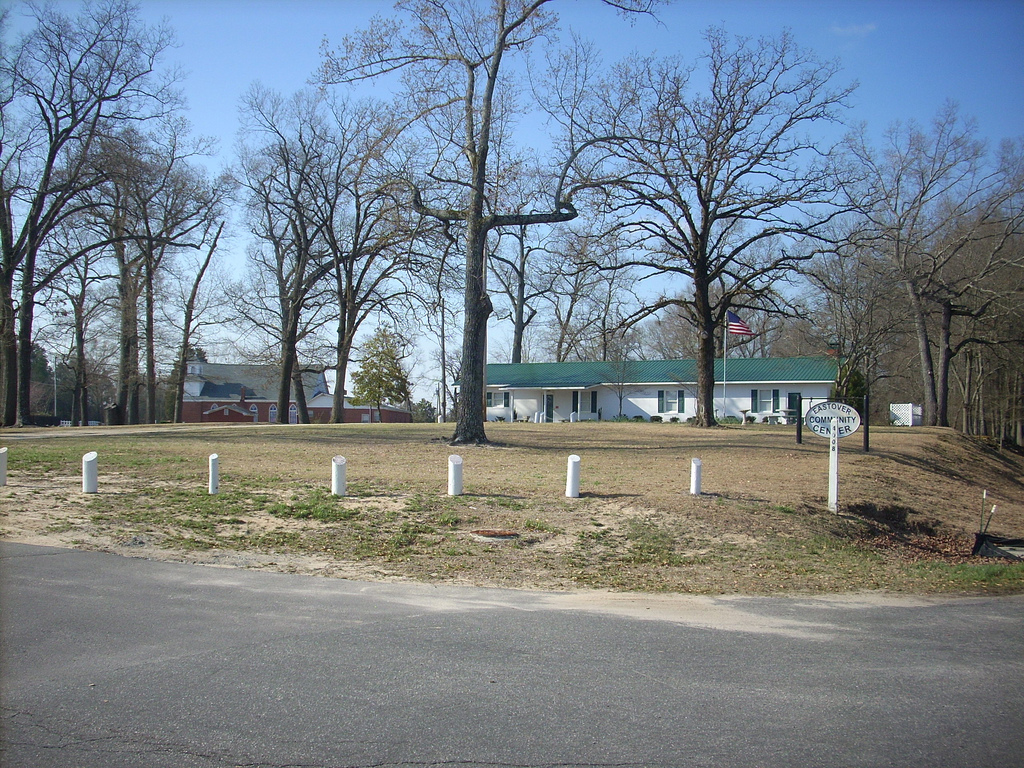
- Eastover Community Center

- Seal
- Motto: "Remembering Our Heritage, Creating Our Future"
- Location in Cumberland County and the state of North Carolina.
- Coordinates: 35°06′29″N 78°46′46″W
- Country: United States
- State: North Carolina
- County: Cumberland
- Incorporated: 2007

Government
  - Mayor: Charles McLaurin

Area
  - Total: 11.34 sq mi (29.36 km^{2})
  - Land: 11.33 sq mi (29.34 km^{2})
  - Water: 0.0077 sq mi (0.02 km^{2})
- Elevation: 141 ft (43 m)

Population (2020)
  - Total: 3,656
  - Density: 322.7/sq mi (124.61/km^{2})
- Time zone: UTC-5 (Eastern (EST))
  - Summer (DST): UTC-4 (EDT)
- ZIP code: 28312
- Area codes: 910, 472
- FIPS code: 37-19740
- GNIS feature ID: 2402438
- Website: www.eastovernc.com

Eastover is a town in Cumberland County, North Carolina, United States. The population was 3,656 at the 2020 census. It was incorporated on July 25, 2007.

== History ==
The Robert Williams House was listed on the National Register of Historic Places in 1983.

== Geography ==
Eastover is located northeast of the center of Cumberland County. It is 7 miles (11 km) northeast of downtown Fayetteville.

U.S. Route 301 passes through the center of the town as Dunn Road. Interstate 95 runs parallel to US 301 on the east side of town, with access from Exits 55, 56, and 58. I-95 leads northeast 82 miles (132 km) to the Rocky Mount area and southwest 91 miles (146 km) to Florence, South Carolina. Interstate 295 leaves I-95 at Exit 58 and heads west as a northern bypass of Fayetteville, while the southern terminus of U.S. Route 13 is also at Exit 58, with the highway leading northeast 50 miles (80 km) to Goldsboro.

According to the United States Census Bureau, Eastover has a total area of 11.4 square miles (29.4 km^{2}), of which 0.01 square miles (0.02 km^{2}), or 0.08%, is water.

== Demographics ==
Historical population
Census	Pop.	Note	%±
1980	1,075		—
1990	1,243		15.6%
2000	1,376		10.7%
2010	3,628		163.7%
2020	3,656		0.8%
U.S. Decennial Census

=== 2020 census ===
Eastover racial composition
Race	Number	Percentage
White (non-Hispanic)	2,548	69.69%
Black or African American (non-Hispanic)	686	18.76%
Native American	54	1.48%
Asian	33	0.9%
Pacific Islander	4	0.11%
Other/Mixed	176	4.81%
Hispanic or Latino	155	4.24%

As of the 2020 census, Eastover had a population of 3,656. The median age was 48.6 years. 19.9% of residents were under the age of 18 and 23.3% were 65 years of age or older. For every 100 females, there were 90.4 males, and for every 100 females age 18 and over, there were 84.4 males age 18 and over.

3.6% of residents lived in urban areas, while 96.4% lived in rural areas.

There were 1,494 households in Eastover, of which 29.3% had children under the age of 18 living in them. Of all households, 52.9% were married-couple households, 15.5% were households with a male householder and no spouse or partner present, and 26.3% were households with a female householder and no spouse or partner present. About 25.9% of all households were made up of individuals, and 12.3% had someone living alone who was 65 years of age or older.

There were 1,658 housing units, of which 9.9% were vacant. The homeowner vacancy rate was 2.5% and the rental vacancy rate was 15.2%.

=== 2010 census ===
As of the census of 2010, there were 3,628 people, 1,476 households, and 1,042 families residing in the town. The population density was 320 inhabitants per square mile (120/km^{2}). There were 1,637 housing units at an average density of 144.5 units/sq mi (55.8/km^{2}). The racial makeup of the CDP was 74.9% White, 19.2% African American, 1.9% Native American, 0.9% Asian, 0.1% Native Hawaiian or Other Pacific Islander, 1.2% some other race, and 1.8% from two or more races. Hispanic or Latino of any race were 3.0% of the population.

There were 1,476 households, out of which 29.9% had children under the age of 18 living with them, 53.4% were headed by married couples living together, 13.3% had a female householder with no husband present, and 29.4% were non-families. 24.7% of all households were made up of individuals, and 10.4% were someone living alone who was 65 years of age or older. The average household size was 2.40, and the average family size was 2.86.

In the CDP the population was spread out, with 21.1% under the age of 18, 6.4% from 18 to 24, 22.7% from 25 to 44, 31.6% from 45 to 64, and 18.4% who were 65 years of age or older. The median age was 44.9 years. For every 100 females, there were 91.9 males. For every 100 females age 18 and over, there were 88.2 males.

=== Income and poverty ===
For the period 2009–13, the estimated median annual income for a household in the CDP was $42,639, and the median income for a family was $62,461. Male full-time workers had a median income of $41,691 versus $46,128 for females. The per capita income for the CDP was $28,108. About 10.2% of families and 8.8% of the total population were below the poverty line, including 7.3% of those under age 18 and 3.8% of those age 65 or over.
