= WMGU =

Southern Pines, North Carolina; United States
- Broadcast area: Fayetteville metropolitan area
- Frequency: 106.9 MHz
- Branding: Magic 106.9

Programming
- Format: Urban adult contemporary
- Affiliations: Premiere Networks

Ownership
- Owner: Cumulus Media; (Cumulus Licensing LLC)
- Sister stations: WFNC, WRCQ, WQSM

History
- First air date: 1992 (as WIOZ)
- Former call signs: WIOZ (1992–1995); WKQB (1995–2005); WFVL (2005–2009)
- Call sign meaning: W MaGic U

Technical information
- Licensing authority: FCC
- Facility ID: 46948
- Class: C2
- ERP: 50,000 watts
- HAAT: 142.8 meters (469 ft)
- Transmitter coordinates: 34°59′53″N 79°15′47″W

Links
- Public license information: Public file; LMS
- Webcast: Listen live
- Website: magic1069.com

WMGU (106.9 FM) is an urban adult contemporary music formatted radio station in the Fayetteville, North Carolina, United States, market, and licensed to Southern Pines. It is owned by Cumulus Media. Its studios are located in west Fayetteville, and its transmitter is located in Raeford, North Carolina.

The station broadcasts the Steve Harvey morning show and The D.L. Hughley Show and The Keith Sweat Hotel

== History ==
At one time, the 106.9 frequency was home to WIOZ-FM, which moved to 102.5 FM in 1995. WKQB played 1970s rock hits and later classic rock before switching to mainstream urban and then country. John Boy and Billy made their debut on the station early in 1997 and moved to WRCQ in 2002. Cumulus Broadcasting bought the station from Muirfield Broadcasting in 2000. In September 2005, Jeff "Goldy" Gold, who had worked for 22 years in Washington, D.C., 12 of those at WBIG-FM, replaced Rick and Bubba in the morning.

WKQB 106.9 made a switch to WFVL with an oldies format on February 17, 2006 which at the time WFVL simulcast on 102.3. Gold was let go in February 2009.

Magic 106.9 logo until May 2021

On March 30, 2009, WFVL made a switch to its current urban adult contemporary format, WMGU "Magic 106.9 FM," and dropped its simulcast and WFVL call sign, which moved to 102.3 FM. Magic 106.9 picked up Steve Harvey when WCCG dropped him, and added Keith Sweat. The station's tower has also been moved 11 miles closer to Fayetteville.

In Spring 2010, WMGU was the number four station in Fayetteville.
