= Fayetteville Area System of Transit =

Public transit system in Fayetteville, North Carolina

Coordinates: 35°03′18.28″N 78°52′03.42″W

- Founded: 1976
- Headquarters: 455 Grove Street
- Locale: Fayetteville, North Carolina
- Service area: Fayetteville/Ft. Bragg, NC
- Service type: Fixed Route, Para Transit
- Routes: 18
- Destinations: Fort Bragg, Cross Creek Mall, Fayetteville State University, Methodist University, Fayetteville Technical Community College, VA Hospital
- Hubs: FAST Multimodal Center; Cross Creek Mall
- Fleet: 29
- Daily ridership: 5,000
- Website: ridefast.net, FAST TransLoc

Standard bus stop signs along FAST routes.

Fayetteville Area System of Transit (FAST) is the public transit system for Fayetteville, North Carolina.

FAST was created in 1976, when the City of Fayetteville took over private transportation system operated by the Cape Fear Transit Bus Company. That system provided services to the current service area and Little Rockfish in Hope Mills. The hours of operation were seven days a week, from 5:30 a.m. to midnight. It had a fleet size of 29 buses and 20 bus operators.

FAST serves 5,000 daily passengers, with 18 daily bus routes operated from 5:30 a.m. to 10:30 p.m., Monday through Friday, and from 7:30 a.m. to 10:30 p.m. on Saturday. In fiscal year 2014, FAST carried just under 1.6 million passenger trips.

== Routes ==
Number	Name	Frequency	Operation			Link
Number	Name	Frequency	Week days	Satur days	Sun days	Link
3	Cedar Creek Road /East Fayetteville /Deep Creek	60 min	6:00; 18:55	8:00; 17:55	9:00; 17:55	link
4	Hillsborough /Department of Social Services /Rosehill Road	60 min	6:00; 19:25	8:30; 17:25	-	link
5	Ramsey Street /Methodist University /VA Hospital	60 min	7:00; 20:55	8:00; 20:55	9:00; 18:55	link
6	University Estates /Bragg Boulevard	60 min	5:30; 21:55	8:30; 21:55	9:30; 18:55	link
7	Raeford Road /Savoy Heights /VA Health Center	60 min (W); 90 min (Sa-Su)	6:00; 19:55	8:00; 19:55	9:30; 18:25	link
8	Southern Avenue /Owen Drive /Cape Fear Valley MC	60 min	6:30; 22:25	8:30; 22:25	9:30; 18:55	link
9	Rosehill Road /Stacy Weaver /Ramsey	60 min	5:30; 21:30	8:02; 21:30	-	link
10	Strickland Bridge Road /Skibo Road	60 min	6:00; 9:26	8:00; 9:26	-	link
11	Ramsey /Country Club /Pamalee	60-120 min	6:30; 20:53	8:53; 22:53	-	link
12	Murchison Rd /Fayetteville State University	30 min (peak M-Sa) /60 min (eve/Su)	5:30; 22:30	7:30; 22:30	9:00; 18:55	link
14	Fort Bragg Road /FTCC /Sycamore Dairy	60 min	6:00; 22:26	7:00; 22:26	9:00; 18:55	link
15	Cape Fear Valley MC /Cross Creek Mall	60 min	6:00; 22:26	8:30; 22:26	9:30; 17:55	link
16	Bragg Boulevard /Eutaw /Cross Creek Mall	60 min	5:30; 20:25	-	-	link
17	West Fayetteville /Reilly /Cliffdale Road	90 min	5:45; 20:28	7:10; 18:40	9:30; 19:13	link
18	Skibo /Cliffdale Road /Hollywood Heights	60 min	6:30; 22:30	8:30; 22:30	9:00; 17:55	link
19	Yadkin Road /Fort Bragg /Cross Creek Mall	60 min	6:00; 19:55	7:00; 18:55	-	link
30	Downtown /Old Wilmington Road /PWC	60 min	8:25; 17:54	-	-	link
31	Southeast Fayetteville /Owen Drive /Enterprise Avenue	60 min	7:24; 19:24	8:24; 19:24	-	link
