= All American Freeway =

- All American Freeway highlighted in red All American Parkway highlighted in dark red

Route information
- Length: 9.34 mi (15.03 km)
- Existed: 1978–present

Major junctions
- South end: Owen Drive in Fayetteville
- US 401 Bus. in Fayetteville; US 401 in Fayetteville; I-295 in Fayetteville
- North end: Longstreet Road in Fort Bragg

Location
- Country: United States
- State: North Carolina
- Counties: Cumberland

Highway system
- North Carolina Highway System; Interstate; US; State; Scenic

The All American Freeway is a highway in the U.S. state of North Carolina connecting I-295 and the western suburbs of Fayetteville to Fort Bragg. The majority of its length is a controlled-access freeway, while the northernmost 1.28 miles (2.06 km) of the road is a limited-access divided highway. Inside Fort Bragg it is named the All American Parkway. The road parallels NC 24/NC 87 (Bragg Boulevard) for much of its length outside of Fort Bragg.

The length of the freeway carries the unsigned designation Secondary Road 1007 (SR 1007) outside of Fort Bragg. SR 1007 also continues southeast from the southern terminus of the freeway along Owen Drive to Wilmington Highway (SR 2337, formerly NC 87).

== Route description ==
=== Fayetteville ===
The All American Freeway begins at a signalized intersection with Owen Drive and Walter Reed Road and heads north-northwest as a four-lane freeway with a Jersey barrier median. It immediately meets US 401 Bus. at an interchange, after which the Jersey barrier becomes a wide grass median. Continuing north through a residential area, the freeway comes to two consecutive diamond interchanges for Cliffdale Road and Morganton Road. Entering a commercial area and passing around the Cross Creek Mall, the road meets US 401 at a folded diamond interchange.

The freeway then continues north through another residential area, meeting Santa Fe Drive before coming to a partially-completed combination interchange with I-295, allowing indirect access to NC 24, NC 87, and NC 210. This interchange marks the boundary of Fort Bragg.

=== Fort Bragg ===
North of NC 295 is the Fort Bragg Visitor Center and Access Control Point (ACP). Visitor passes are issued to non-DOD persons with a valid reason for entering Ft. Bragg. At this point, the road becomes the All American Parkway

Immediately beyond the ACP is an interchange with Gruber Road. The parkway continues north as a freeway before turning west. A partial interchange allows access from the northbound parkway to the one-way northbound Reilly Road as well as a southbound entrance from Honeycutt Road. The freeway portion ends at a signalized intersection with one-way southbound Zabitosky Road, becoming a four-lane, limited-access surface road with a wide grass median. Turning again to the north, the parkway intersects Normandy Drive before coming to the entrance to the Womack Army Medical Center. North of the hospital, the road ends at a signalized intersection with Long Street.

== History ==
Beginning in 1963, the State Highway Commission planned the Owen Drive Freeway to link Fort Bragg and the Pope Air Force Base to the area of the Cape Fear Valley Medical Center. Construction of the freeway between Owen Drive in Fayetteville and Zabitosky Drive in Fort Bragg began on May 9, 1974 and completed on September 15, 1978 as the All American Freeway. The at-grade extension as the All American Parkway to Longstreet Road was completed in the 1990s.

After the September 11 attacks, a security checkpoint was installed on the northbound freeway entering Fort Bragg. By 2006, the permanent Access Control Point was constructed.

Construction on a new diamond interchange at Cliffdale Road began in 1993 and was completed by 2001. The next new interchange to be added was with NC 295. Construction on the segment east of the All American Freeway began in 2011 and finished in 2016. The remainder of the interchange is projected to open in late 2018 or early 2019 with the next segment of NC 295.

=== North Carolina Highway 555 ===
North Carolina Highway 555
- Location: Fayetteville – Fort Bragg, NC
- Length: 11.7 mi (18.8 km)

On May 16, 2014, the City of Fayetteville and Fort Bragg filed a request with NCDOT to replace the entirety of SR 1007 with a new NC 555 designation. This designation would begin at Wilmington Highway and follow Owen Drive and the All American Freeway before terminating at the Fort Bragg Access Control Point. As of May 2022, this redesignation has yet to be approved.

== Major intersections ==
The entire route is in Cumberland County. All exits are unnumbered.

Location	mi	km	Destinations	Notes
Fayetteville	0.00	0.00	Owen Drive / Walter Reed Road	Southern terminus; at-grade intersection
Fayetteville	0.45	0.72	US 401 Bus. (Raeford Road)	
Fayetteville	1.81	2.91	Cliffdale Road	
Fayetteville	2.45	3.94	Morganton Road	
Fayetteville	3.09	4.97	US 401 (By-Pass)	
Fayetteville	4.67	7.52	Santa Fe Drive	
Fayetteville	5.66	9.11	I-295 to NC 24 / NC 87 (Bragg Boulevard) / NC 210 (Murchison Road)	Exits 21A-B on I-295
Fort Bragg	6.53	10.51	Fort Bragg Access Control Point; All American Freeway becomes All American Parkway	
Fort Bragg	6.71	10.80	Gruber Road	Interchange
Fort Bragg	7.82	12.59	Rock Merritt Avenue	Partial interchange; eastbound entrance from Honeycutt Road; westbound exit to Rock Merritt Avenue northbound only; access to Rock Merritt Avenue southbound via Zabitosky Road
Fort Bragg	9.34	15.03	Long Street	Northern terminus
1.000 mi = 1.609 km; 1.000 km = 0.621 mi: Incomplete access; Route transition
