= WQSM =

Fayetteville, North Carolina; United States
- Broadcast area: Fayetteville metropolitan area
- Frequency: 98.1 MHz
- Branding: Q98

Programming
- Format: Top 40 (CHR)
- Affiliations: United Stations Radio Networks; Westwood One

Ownership
- Owner: Cumulus Media; (Cumulus Licensing LLC)
- Sister stations: WFNC, WMGU, WRCQ

History
- First air date: 1947 (as WFNC-FM)
- Former call signs: WFNC-FM (1947–1969)

Technical information
- Licensing authority: FCC
- Facility ID: 8582
- Class: C1
- Power: 100,000 watts
- HAAT: 253 meters
- Transmitter coordinates: 35°04′36″N 78°55′58″W

Links
- Public license information: Public file; LMS
- Webcast: Listen live
- Website: www.q98fm.com

WQSM (98.1 FM) is a licensed class C1 top 40 (CHR) radio station based in Fayetteville, North Carolina, United States. Owned and operated by Cumulus Media, Q98 has offices, studios and transmitter located at 1009 Drayton Road in downtown Fayetteville.

== History ==
WFNC-FM signed on in 1947 and was the only FM station in Fayetteville for many years. Victor Dawson, who started out managing WFNC for his father, was one of the few to realize that FM had a future. In 1969, when WFNC-FM became WQSM and began playing country music, few cars had FM radios and WQSM began selling converters to potential listeners.

On Monday March 8, 1976, WQSM gave up its country music format and switched formats with its sister station WFNC. WQSM started playing top 40 music and WFNC took over the country music format. WQSM featured an automated Stereo Rock format until 1984. WQSM continued to play top 40 music until 1989. Sunday afternoon staples were Rick Dees Weekly Top 40 and American Top 40 with Casey Kasem. The AM carried American Country Countdown with Don Bowman, then Bob Kingsley. WQSM used the slogan HitRadio Q98.

For nearly 14 years ending on October 18, 1989, WQSM played Top 40, starting with the automated TM (See Jones Radio Networks) Stereo Rock format. Q98 took 18 months to reach number one, and in April 1982, the station had 25.4 percent of listeners 12 and over in Cumberland County, the largest market share for any FM station in the country.

In 1984 Jay Andrews was hired from WZGC in Atlanta as WQSM's program director to manage and take the station live 24/7. Andrews handled the station's morning show. His show included news twice per hour and banter between himself, numerous listener call-ins, and news director Bill McClement. In one ratings cycle Andrews established the highest morning ratings in the station's history. Bringing popular acts Kool & The Gang, Kiss, Bon Jovi, A Flock Of Seagulls and others added to Q98's success. Working with the city of Fayetteville to promote the newly furbished 'Fayetteville Commons' downtown, Q98 hosted a street dance attended by several thousand to introduce the city's new downtown area. Contesting included The Dollar Bill Game and album 6-pack give-a-ways. WQSM's ratings increased to a 26 12+ share of the market, and in 1986 WQSM was listed by Billboard as the 11th highest-cumeing CHR FM in America. Andrews left WQSM in 1987 for ownership of WDGR.

After Scott McLeod was hired a program director, the station gradually began moving in a more adult direction. With a switch to adult contemporary music from the 1960s through the present, "Q-98" became "Magic 98". Owner Cape Fear Broadcasting had to file suit in federal court when Raleigh-based Voyager Communications claimed it had the exclusive right to use the Magic name in North Carolina. Voyager finally agreed to let the name be used "in exchange for a nominal licensing fee."

The Q98 name was back by 1992.

The syndicated Bob and Sheri show made its debut on WQSM in 1998. 10 years later, Bob Lacey and Sheri Lynch celebrated their own anniversary by helping Q98 celebrate 30 years. Q98 had considered a local morning show in 2002 but good ratings made the station take a second look.

The station, also, carries the nationally syndicated Open House Party with John Garabedian on Saturday nights. The show was aired until around 2004, when it was taken off of the air in favor of a locally produced show. Open House Party made a return on December 7, 2005. On the night of March 26, 2011, Q98 began broadcasting Open House Party from 7:00 p.m. to 5:00 a.m. Before March 26, 2011, the station would broadcast Open House Party from 7:00 p.m. to midnight.

In September 1999, Cumulus Broadcasting announced plans to buy WQSM, WRCQ, WFNC and WFNC-FM from Cape Fear. This sale was challenged by Ocean Broadcasting of Wilmington, North Carolina, because it would give Cumulus 6 FMs and an AM in Wilmington, and about 55 percent of market revenue. By the time the deal was completed in 2001, Cumulus properties also included WKQB. When WFNC stopped doing daily editorials, WQSM was one of the stations that aired taped editorials instead.
