= Cross Creek Mall =

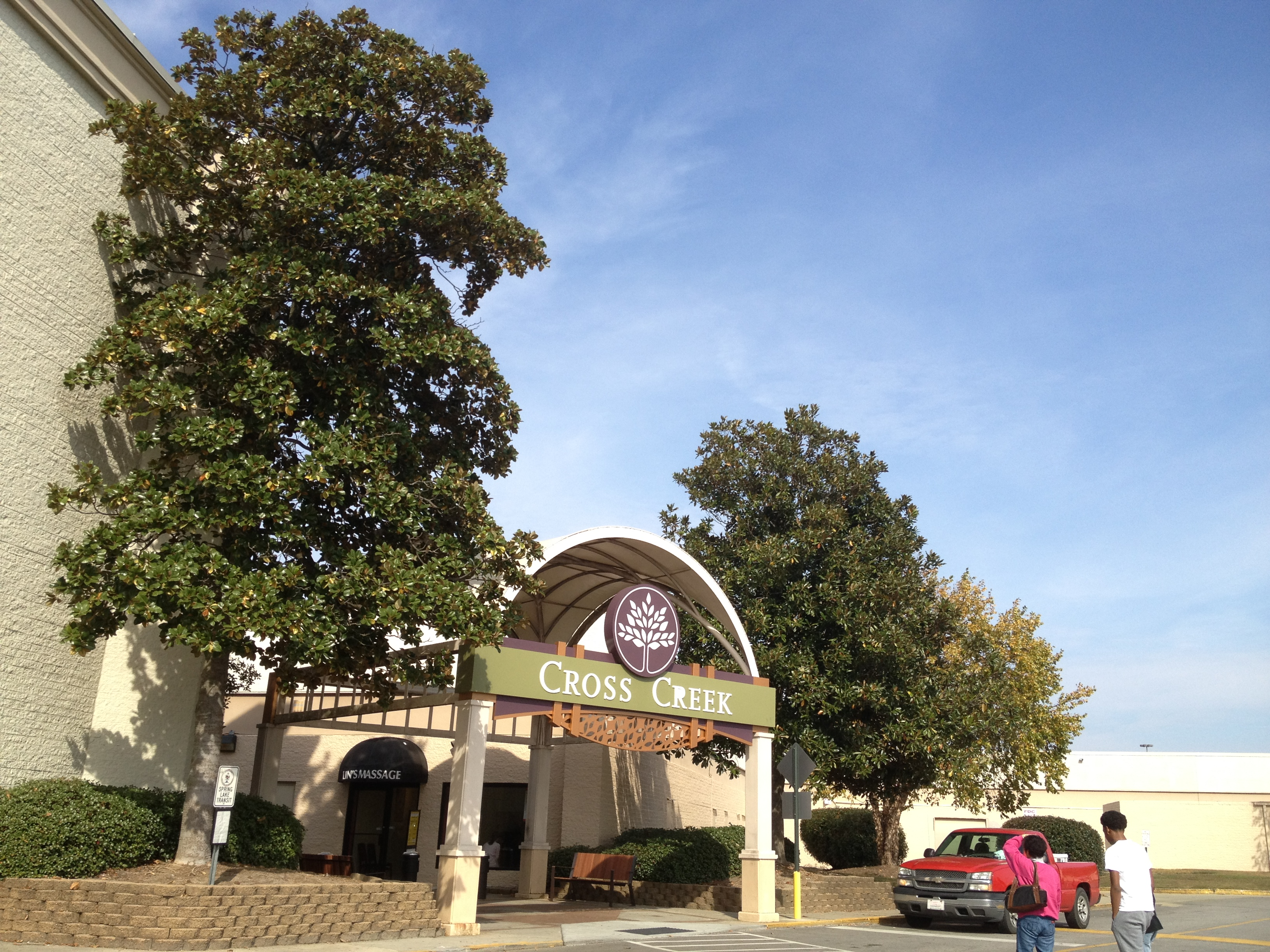
- Entrance to Cross Creek Mall, November 2012
- Location: Fayetteville, North Carolina, United States
- Coordinates: 35°04′20″N 78°57′39″W
- Address: 419 Cross Creek Mall
- Opened: February 26, 1975
- Developer: Henry Faison
- Manager: CBL Properties
- Owner: CBL Properties
- Num. of stores: 150+
- Num. of anchor tenants: 3
- Floor area: 1,054,034 sq ft (97,923.0 m^{2})
- Floors: 1 (2 in anchors)
- Parking: 5,672 spaces
- Website: crosscreekmall.com

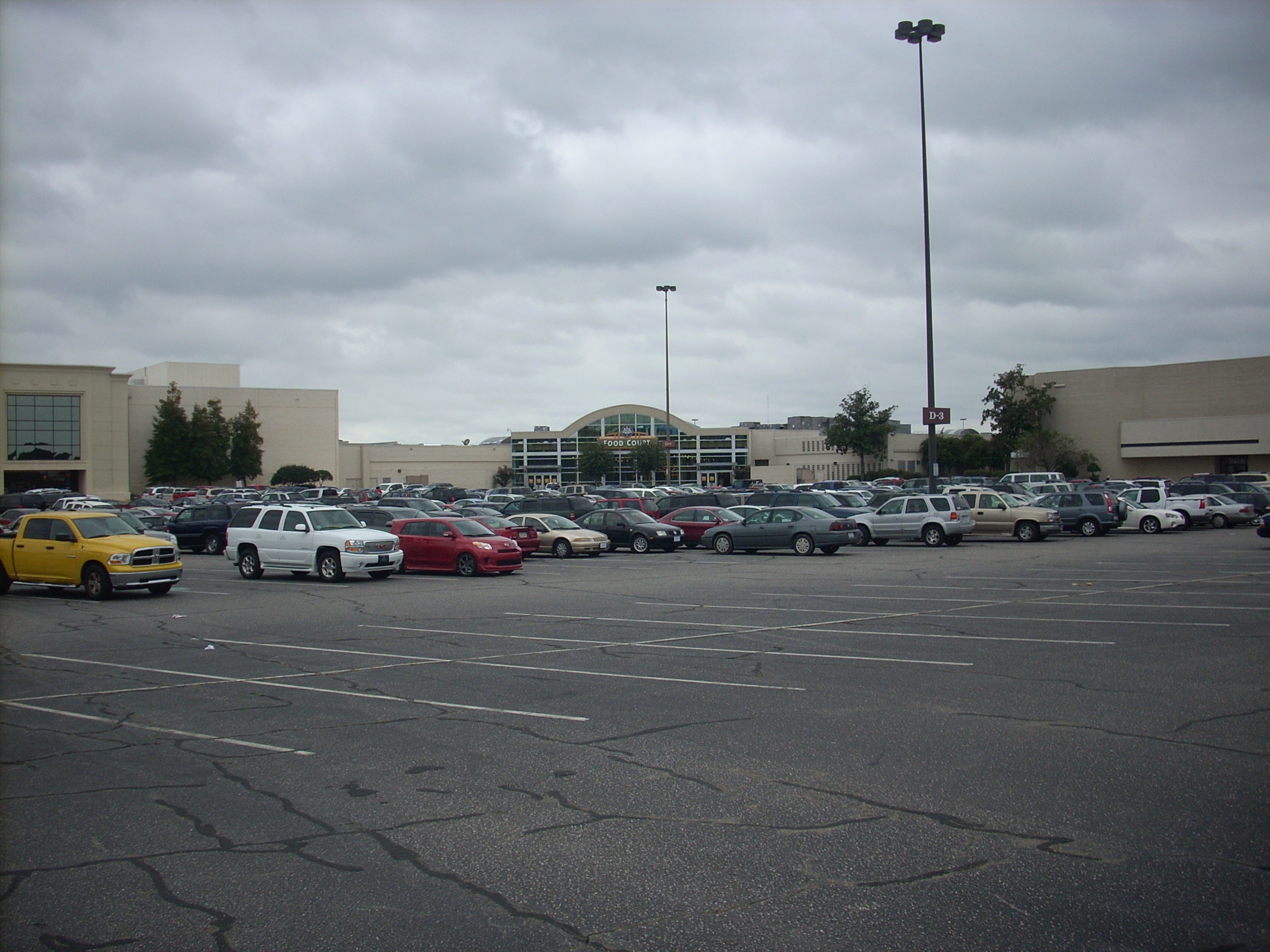
Cross Creek Mall

Cross Creek Mall is a regional shopping mall located in Fayetteville, North Carolina, on the 401 Bypass between Morganton Road and the All-American Freeway. The mall contains over 150 stores and covers over 1,000,000 sq ft (93,000 m^{2}). of retail space. Its anchors include Belk, Macy's, and JCPenney. The mall is owned by CBL & Associates Properties.

== History ==
The mall's 90-acre (36 ha) site was part of a larger 600-acre (240 ha) tract of land owned by Fayetteville, North Carolina developer J.P. Riddle Jr., and was sold in 1970 to Henry Faison, a Charlotte-based developer. The All American Freeway was planned at the time, but the area was predominantly farmland. Construction of the freeway began in May 1974, nine months before the mall opened on February 26, 1975. The mall opened with five anchors, three of which moved from downtown Fayetteville: Sears, Belk, and JCPenney; Miller & Rhoads and Thalhimer's, were new to the area. The mall also had a three screen movie theater named Cross Creek Mall Cinemas I-II-III, which opened two days after the mall's opening on February 28, 1975. The cinema was owned by General Cinema Corporation, and closed on January 23, 2001. Shortly after in 2002, the cinema was replaced with a new food court named Creekside Café. Miller & Rhoads closed in 1985. Thalhimer's became Hecht's in 1992, which in turn became Macy's in 2006.

On October 15, 2018, it was announced that Sears would be closing as part of a plan to close 142 stores nationwide. The final day of Sears was January 6, 2019, ending a nearly 44-year run at the mall. After much speculation, in January 2020, CBL Properties announced Dave & Buster's would be replacing the former Sears location. The Sears was successfully demolished in April of that year. However, it was later revealed that Dave & Buster's was no longer coming to the mall, and that Rooms To Go was in the process of building a location on the former site. Rooms To Go finished construction in late 2021, along with the addition of LongHorn Steakhouse.

In December 2022, Main Event, a subsidiary of Dave & Buster's, revealed it was building a location attached to the mall on the outside in place of the former Sears. Construction finished the following year and the grand opening was on August 11, 2023. US Foods CHEF'STORE and Caribbean cuisine Bahama Breeze also announced they would be building locations on the premises of the mall, and would open in the Spring of 2024. In 2026, Bahama Breeze closed and was converted into a Chuy's Tex Mex Grill.
