= Liberty Point Resolves =

Resolution signed by fifty residents of Cumberland County, North Carolina

The Liberty Point Resolves, also known as "The Cumberland Association", was a resolution signed by fifty-five residents of Cumberland County, North Carolina, early in the American Revolution.

On June 20, 1775, these Patriots, who had formed themselves into a group known simply as "The Association", signed a document protesting the actions of Great Britain following the battles of Lexington and Concord. According to local tradition, the signers met at Lewis Barge's tavern in Cross Creek (now part of Fayetteville). The signers expressed the hope that Great Britain and the colonies would be reconciled, but vowed that, if necessary, they would "go forth and be ready to sacrifice our lives and fortunes to secure her freedom and safety". The resolves were thus not a declaration of independence—public advocation for separation from Great Britain would not become common until 1776.

The period of the American Revolution was a time of divided loyalties in Cumberland County, and a considerable portion of the population, especially the Highland Scots who had immigrated in 1739, were staunchly loyal to the British Crown. Among them was the famous Scottish heroine Flora MacDonald. The Liberty Point document followed the similar Mecklenburg Resolutions by just a month and preceded the United States Declaration of Independence by a little more than a year.

Two centuries following the events of Liberty Point Resolves, it was discovered that sixteen of the signers were forgotten. These names were later added to the back of the Liberty Point Resolves monument on February 17, 1976, to commemorate them.

== Text ==
The brief document read:

At a general meeting of the several Committees of the District of Wilmington, held at the court-house in Wilmington, Tuesday, the 20th June, 1775;

Resolved, That the following Association stand as the Association of this Committee, and that it be recommended to the inhabitants of this District to sign the same as speedily as possible.

The Association.

The actual commencement of hostilities against this continent by the British troops, in the bloody scene on the 19th of April last near Boston– The increase of arbitrary impositions, from a wicked and despotic ministry, and the dread of instigated insurrections in the colonies, are causes sufficient to drive an oppressed people to the use of arms: We, therefore, the subscribers of Cumberland County, holding ourselves bound by that most sacred of all obligations, the duty of good citizens towards an injured country, and thoroughly convinced that under our distressed circumstances we shall be justified before God and man in resisting force by force; Do unite ourselves under every tie of religion, honour, and associate as a band in her defence against every foe, hereby solemnly engaging that whenever our continental or Provincial Councils shall decree it necessary, we will go forth and be ready to sacrifice our lives and fortunes to secure her freedom and safety: This obligation to continue in full force until a reconciliation shall take place between Great–Britain and America, upon constitutional principles: an event we most ardently desire; And we will hold all those persons inimical to the liberty of the colonies, who shall refuse to subscribe to this Association; and we will in all things follow the advice of our General Committee, respecting the purposes aforesaid, the preservation of peace and good order, and the safety of individuals and private property.

— https://dc.lib.unc.edu/cdm/singleitem/collection/02ddd/id/446851/rec/8

Robert Rowan, who apparently organized the group, signed first. The names of other signers include those of families who made a deep imprint on the Cape Fear region, from colonial times onward: Barge, Bowell, Evans, Elwell, Greer, Carver, Council, Gee, Blocker, Hollingsworth. The event is commemorated today by a memorial and plaque in downtown Fayetteville, near the corner of Bow and Person Streets.

== Liberty Point Resolves Monument ==
In 1933, the Liberty Point Monument Association, headed by President Sewberry, planned for another celebration to mark the creation of a “boulder” memorial with thirty-nine of the signers’ names.[4] To prepare for the funding of the granite memorial, the ladies of the association held several programs. In one event, each household decorated their house as a representation of a country and allowed visitors inside as part of a “Trip Around the World.” They also sold photographs of Liberty Point and donated their own money for funding.[5] On a Monday afternoon during the first week of July, the monument was unveiled at the corner of Bow and Person streets. The monument itself was helped in its creation by “several small boys and girls, all lineal descendants of the Cumberland county” signers.[6] Judge N. A. Sinclair introduced Judge George W. Connor, who spoke the address of dedication for the commemoration.[7]

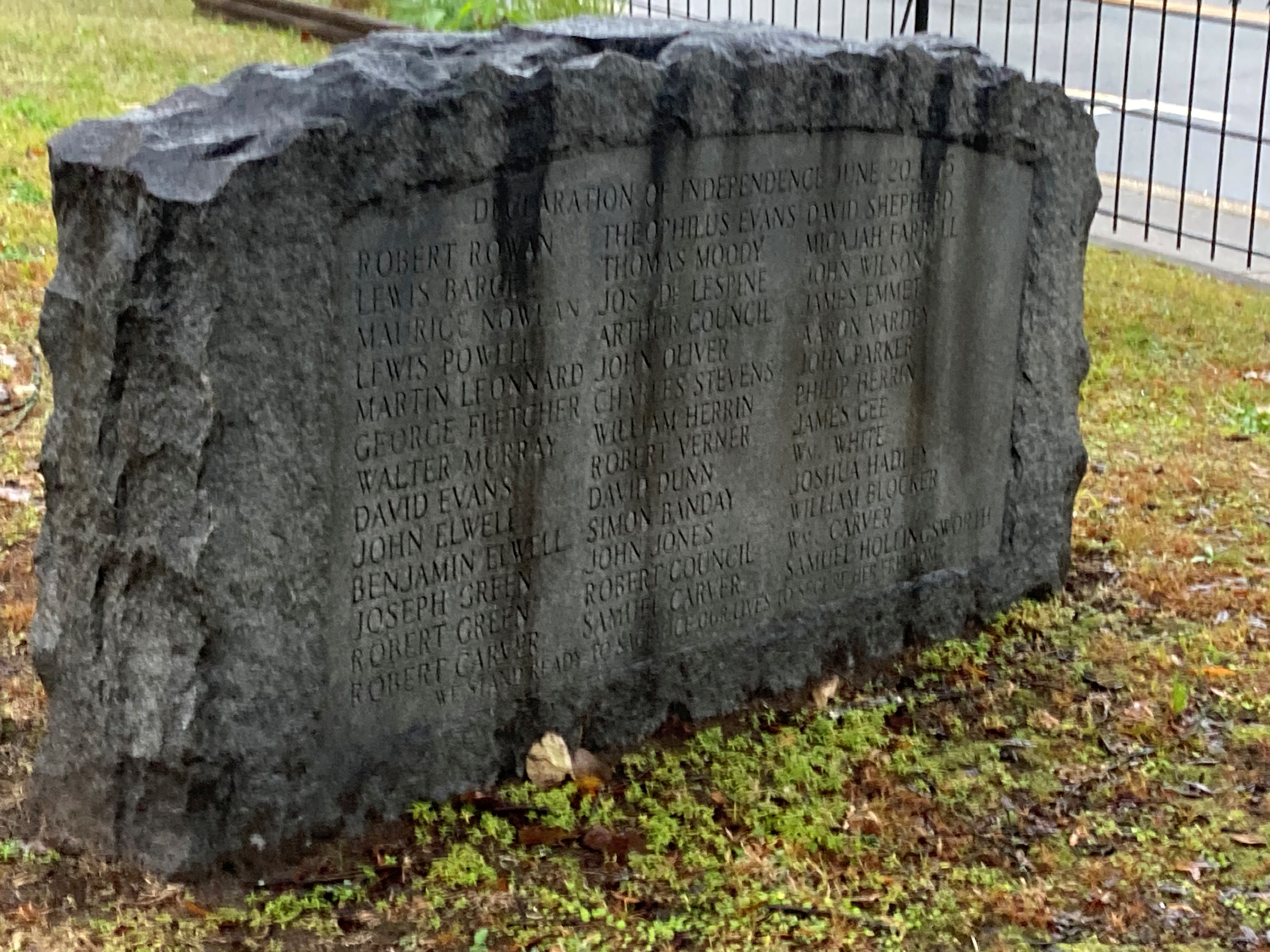
An image of the front of the Liberty Point Resolves Monument, listing thirty-nine of the signers.

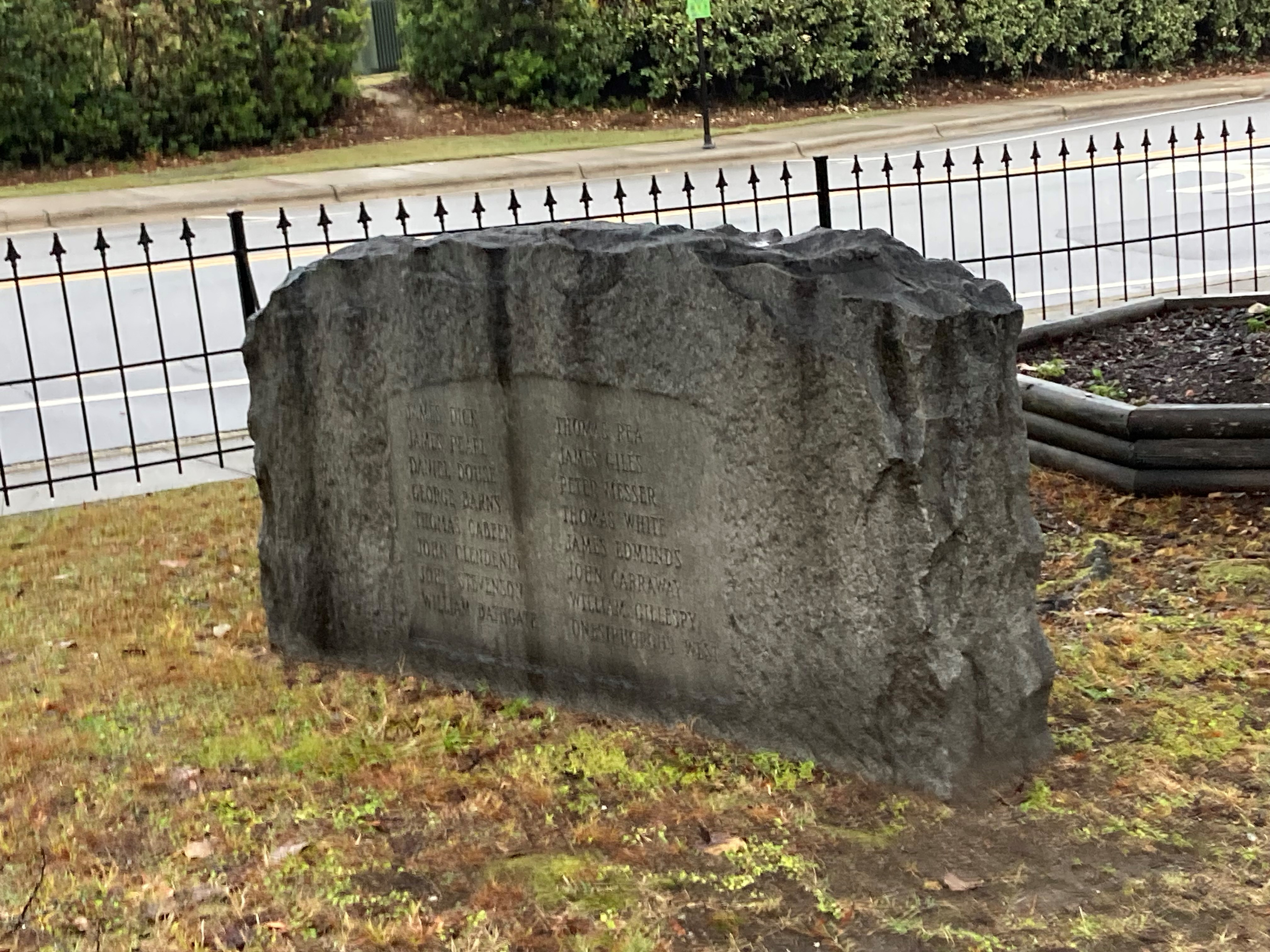
A photograph of the back of the Liberty Point Resolves monument, listing sixteen signers who were later added in 1976.

== Signers ==
- Robert Rowan
- Peter Messer
- Samuel Hollingsworth
- Lewis Bowell
- Maurice Nowlan
- Thomas Cabeen
- John Clendenin
- Theophilus Evans
- Daniel Douse
- William Carver
- Joseph De Lespine
- James Dick
- James Edmunds
- John Oliver
- John Stevenson
- John Carraway
- Micajah Farrell
- William Bathgate
- William Herrin
- John Wilson
- Charles Stevens
- David Evans
- Thomas Rea
- John Parker
- James Gee
- James Emmet
- Walter Murray
- Benjamin Elwell
- Aaron Vardey
- William Gillespy
- William White
- Onesiphorus West
- Philip Herrin
- Joseph Greer
- George Fletcher
- Robert Verner
- Thomas White
- James Pearl
- John Elwell
- John Jones
- Lewis Barge
- David Dunn
- Robert Council
- Martin Leonard
- Simon Banday
- James Giles
- Thomas Moody
- Robert Greer
- Robert Carver
- Arthur Council
- Joshua Hadley
- Samuel Carver
- David Shepherd
- William Blocker
- George Barns
