= Robert Williams House =

Historic house in North Carolina, United States

- U.S. National Register of Historic Places
- Location within North Carolina Location within the United States
- Location: SR 1728, near Eastover, North Carolina
- Coordinates: 35°5′16″N 78°48′56″W
- Area: 4 acres (1.6 ha)
- Built: c. 1850
- Architectural style: Greek Revival, Coastal Cottage
- NRHP reference No.: 83001875
- Added to NRHP: July 21, 1983

Robert Williams House is a historic home located near Eastover, Cumberland County, North Carolina. It was built about 1850, and is a 1 1/2-story Greek Revival style Coastal Cottage form dwelling. It has a gable roof with exterior end chimneys and features an engaged porch. Also on the property are the contributing smokehouse, original log corn crib, and a stable with loft.

It was listed on the National Register of Historic Places in 1983.
