= WFVL =

Lumberton, North Carolina; United States
- Broadcast area: Fayetteville metropolitan area
- Frequency: 102.3 (MHz)

Programming
- Format: Contemporary Christian

Ownership
- Owner: Educational Media Foundation

History
- First air date: 1964
- Former call signs: WAGR-FM (1964–1972); WJSK (1972–1998); WFNC-FM (1998–2009)
- Call sign meaning: WFayetteViLle

Technical information
- Licensing authority: FCC
- Facility ID: 41311
- Class: A
- ERP: 6,000 watts
- HAAT: 82 meters (269 ft)
- Transmitter coordinates: 34°35′58″N 79°00′33″W

Links
- Public license information: Public file; LMS
- Website: klove.com

WFVL is a K-Love-affiliated Contemporary Christian radio station in the Fayetteville, North Carolina, United States, market which broadcasts on 102.3 FM.

== History ==
Prior to March 9, 1998, this station was a Country station in Lumberton, North Carolina with the call letters WJSK. Al Kahn, who bought WAGR in January 1957, signed WJSK on the air in 1964 and took the station's letters from the names of his sons Jeff and Steve Kahn.

After Messa Corp. bought the stations from Southeastern Broadcasting Corp. in July 1992, WJSK and WAGR ended their tradition of airing only Lumberton high school football and began carrying games involving other Robeson County teams.

In 1993, Arthur DeBerry and Associates of Durham bought WAGR and WJSK.

Cape Fear Broadcasting bought the station in 1998 and changed the call sign to WFNC-FM.

In 1999, Cape Fear Broadcasting announced the sale of its stations to Cumulus Broadcasting. This sale was challenged by Ocean Broadcasting of Wilmington, North Carolina because it would give Cumulus 6 FMs and an AM in Wilmington, and about 55 percent of market revenue.

Until 2006, this station aired the same programming as talk radio station WFNC WFNC-FM then simulcast WFVL until 2009. On March 30, 2009, the simulcast with WFVL 106.9 FM ended when the station (now WMGU) changed formats to Urban adult contemporary. The oldies format continued without 106.9 FM and on April 1, 2009, the WFVL call sign replaced WFNC-FM on 102.3 FM.

Educational Media Foundation bought WFVL from Cumulus in exchange for a Louisiana station. EMF changed WFVL to the K-LOVE Contemporary Christian format.
