= WRCQ =

Dunn, North Carolina; United States
- Broadcast area: Fayetteville Metropolitan Area
- Frequency: 103.5 MHz (HD Radio)
- Branding: Rock 103

Programming
- Format: Mainstream rock
- Subchannels: HD2: WFNC simulcast (News/talk)
- Affiliations: Premiere Networks; Westwood One; Carolina Panthers Radio Network

Ownership
- Owner: Cumulus Media; (Cumulus Licensing LLC)
- Sister stations: WFNC, WMGU, WQSM

History
- First air date: May 17, 1971 (as WQTI)
- Former call signs: WQTI (1971–1982); WIDO (1982–1985); WDKS (1985–1989)
- Call sign meaning: Call letters to have stood for Rock

Technical information
- Licensing authority: FCC
- Facility ID: 34826
- Class: C2
- ERP: 48,000 watts
- HAAT: 153 meters (502 ft)
- Transmitter coordinates: 35°03′9″N 78°38′54″W

Links
- Public license information: Public file; LMS
- Webcast: Listen live
- Website: rock103rocks.com

WRCQ (103.5 FM) is a radio station broadcasting a mainstream rock music format. Licensed to Dunn, North Carolina, United States, it serves the Fayetteville area. The station is currently owned by Cumulus Media. Its studios are located in west Fayetteville, and its transmitter is located east of Fayetteville in rural Sampson County, North Carolina.

== History ==
Lincoln "Uncle Linc" Faulk, a longtime general manager and announcer at WCKB, helped start WQTI, which played easy listening music. In 1976, Robie Butler and his mother, Mrs. Walton Baggett, sold WQTI to Rev. Gardner Altman and his son, Gardner Altman, Jr. The elder Altman would later own several Fayetteville-area stations, including WFLB and WFAI. The Gardners sold WQTI to William Belche, which complemented his AM daytimer, a Gospel and Urban Contemporary station licensed to Fayetteville.

William Belche Sr. changed the letters from WQTI to WIDO ("D-103") in 1982. In 1985, Belche sold WIDO to Maurie Webster and Dean Landsman, who changed the letters to WDKS. The studios and transmitter were in Dunn, but sales and management offices were in Fayetteville in 1989. The format was urban contemporary. Landsman had been the Program Consultant to Belche's stations. Upon taking over the FM, the sales tripled in the first year, and the station went on to score the highest Arbitron ratings in market history.

Metropolitan Broadcasting of North Carolina Inc., a partnership of real estate developers, bought WDKS in 1989 for $2 million from Landsman Media of New York City, which had already applied for a power increase from 3000 watts to 50,000 and a frequency change from 103.1 to 103.5.

Late in 1989, WDKS increased its power, changed to the letters WRCQ, and began playing classic rock. WRCQ aired the same programming as WZNS briefly in 1993.

Metropolitan Broadcasting sold WRCQ to Kinetic Communications Inc. of Florida, in a $2.8 million deal announced in 1994, to focus on real estate. The new owners focused more on new artists and less on the classics. As general manager Howard Johnson explained it, "It was sitting here next to a military base with all these men, and this station wasn't doing well. ... My station is doing well. The station is profitable."

In March 1997, WRCQ added Howard Stern. Former morning hosts Mad Max, Bogie and Matt Patrick moved to afternoons. In 1998, Cape Fear Broadcasting, owner of three area stations, announced its purchase of WRCQ, which was describing its format as modern rock.

In 1999, Cape Fear Broadcasting announced the sale of its stations to Cumulus. This sale was challenged by Ocean Broadcasting of Wilmington, North Carolina because it would give Cumulus 6 FMs and an AM in Wilmington, and about 55 percent of market revenue. Even before Cumulus owned WRCQ, Stern was dropped December 31, 1999 first for music and then Lex and Terry. The sale was completed in May 2001 and when WFNC stopped doing daily editorials, WRCQ was one of the stations that aired taped editorials instead.

John Boy and Billy replaced Lex and Terry when WKQB, also purchased by Cumulus, dropped classic rock in 2002.
