= WFNC (AM) =

- Fayetteville, North Carolina; United States
- Broadcast area: Fayetteville metropolitan area
- Frequency: 640 kHz
- Branding: WFNC AM 640

Programming
- Format: Talk radio
- Affiliations: Fox News Radio; Premiere Networks; Salem Radio Network; Westwood One

Ownership
- Owner: Cumulus Media; (Cumulus Licensing LLC)
- Sister stations: WMGU, WQSM, WRCQ

History
- First air date: 1940; 86 years ago
- Call sign meaning: Fayetteville, North Carolina

Technical information
- Licensing authority: FCC
- Facility ID: 8583
- Class: B
- Power: 10,000 watts days 1,000 watts nights
- Transmitter coordinates: 35°04′46″N 78°55′58″W
- Repeater: 103.5 WRCQ-HD2 (Dunn)

Links
- Public license information: Public file; LMS
- Webcast: Listen live
- Website: wfnc640am.com

WFNC (640 kHz) is a commercial AM radio station in Fayetteville, North Carolina, broadcasting a conservative talk radio format. It is owned by Cumulus Media with studios and transmitter on Drayton Road off Bragg Boulevard.

By day, it is powered at 10,000 watts. But at night, to reduce interference to other stations on 640 AM, it reduces power to 1,000 watts. It uses a non-directional antenna at all times.

== Programming ==
Weekday mornings on WFNC begin with a news and interview program, Good Morning, Fayetteville hosted by Gilbert Baez. The rest of the weekday schedule is nationally syndicated conservative talk programs: The Chris Plante Show, The Vince Show with Vince Coglianese, The Guy Benson Show, The Mark Levin Show, The Sean Hannity Show, and Red Eye Radio.

Weekends feature shows on a variety of subjects including money, health, technology, travel, home improvement, and real estate. Syndicated shows include At Home with Gary Sullivan, The Kim Komando Show, The Weekend with Michael Brown, Travel with Rudy Maxa, and Real Estate Today. Most hours begin with an update from CBS News Radio.

== History ==
=== Early years ===
WFNC signed on the air in 1940, the first radio station in Fayetteville. Over the years, it has operated on several frequencies and with different owners. At its debut, Victor Dawson managed the station for his father John Gilbert Dawson. WFNC was initially powered at 250 watts at 1420 AM. On March 29, 1941, the frequency changed to 1450 AM.

WFNC was a network affiliate of the Mutual Broadcasting System, airing its dramas, comedies, news, and sports. Later, WFNC became a CBS Radio affiliate and continues with CBS to the present time. The frequency changed in 1947 to 940 AM with a power of 50,000 watts daytime and 1,000 watts night time, using a directional antenna.

=== Move to 640 AM ===
Beginning in November 1985, WFNC began to run advertisements in The Fayetteville Observer newspaper showing the 9 slowly rolling to a 6 in its frequency. On the actual day of the switch, the new 640 logo was published. After almost 40 years on 940 kHz, management decided the night time signal needed improvement. Being on 940 kHz, WFNC could not transmit a signal north of Fayetteville at night, since it had to protect clear channel station CBM in Montreal (now CFNV). WFNC and CBM both operated on 940 and CBM was the older station with protection from interference.

At sunset, when WFNC lowered power and changed to directional antenna, there were fans of the station living a short distance north of town who could not clearly hear WFNC due to the signal change. By switching to 640 kHz, WFNC could have a 1,000-watt night signal with a uniform circular pattern, which in essence increased its range to areas that had never heard WFNC after dark. The negative of all of that was that WFNC had to reduce its daytime power from 50,000 watts down to 10,000 watts, but to station management, it was well worth the effort to get more night time listeners.

At 7:45 am on Wednesday, January 15, 1986, Chief Engineer Terry Jordan threw the switch and WFNC moved to 640 AM with a power of 10,000 watts daytime and 1,000 watts nighttime, using a nondirectional antenna.

=== Top 40 and Country ===
In the 1980s and 90s, WFNC played top 40 music and later country music. Some of the DJs were Paul Michaels, Paul Gold, Ted Harris, Jackie Sands, Don Perkins, Dan Mitchell, Bob Brandon, and Randy Jenkins. In the late evening and overnights, WFNC played automated music. In the country music days, WFNC carried the syndicated program "Live from Gilleys". WFNC also aired Casey Kasem's "American Top 40" during the Top 40 days. It later ran Don Bowman and Bob Kingsley's "American Country Countdown" on Sunday afternoons.

Wendy Riddle, who joined the station in 1977, and news director Jeff Thompson co-hosted the morning show, entitled "Top of the Morning", which began in January 1977. of the station's other local talk show "Sound Off," the longest-running show on the station, having started in 1972 This was when WFNC still played top 40 music. "Sound Off" aired from 9-10AM Monday to Friday. Jeff Thompson primarily handled local news and in the late 1980s was joined in the afternoons by Johnnie Joyce. Joyce died in the late 1990s after having a noted career in local news, not only at WFNC, but at WFLB, WFBS, and WFAI.

On Monday, March 8, 1976, WFNC changed formats with its sister station WQSM-FM 98.1 MHz. At that point, WQSM-FM began playing top 40 music while WFNC began airing country music. As a part of the country format, Brother Strickland, a local gospel announcer, ran two hours of Southern gospel music mornings from 5-7 AM first on WQSM-FM and then on WFNC. In January 1977, the gospel music was dropped and WFNC began to air 3 hours of news from 6-9 AM called "Top of the Morning". Brother Strickland moved his program to gospel station WSTS-FM 96.5 MHz in Laurinburg, NC.

=== Updating the programming ===
The 3-hour news show "Top of the Morning" was followed by "Sound Off" from 9-10 AM. After the 10 am CBS Radio News, WFNC would play country music for the remainder of the broadcast day and overnight. On Sunday mornings, WFNC would air local church programming and public affairs shows such as FCCYC and programs from Fort Bragg Public Affairs Office. After Terry Jordan was hired at WFNC he brought with him his program, "At the Console" . "At the Console" had originally aired on crosstown rival WFAI. This program was recorded at various churches in the Fayetteville area and it showcased both religious and classical music played on the organ or pipe organ. Sometimes Terry would showcase the piano. This show aired at 7:30 am Sunday mornings. After WKML 95.7 MHz came on the air in the middle 1980s, it would sometimes beat WFNC in the ratings except in the mornings. Management decided to go with a half news and half modified middle of the road (MOR) music mix.

By switching frequencies from 940 kHz to 640 kHz, listeners north of Fayetteville could now hear the "Friday Night Football Game of the Week." This was begun by Lloyd Foster, who was hired by Victor Dawson in 1952. Foster covered Fayetteville High School football games for many seasons. Other sports broadcasters included Charles Koonce, Dave Foster, Steve Driggers, Donnie Dees, Chris Foster, Andrew Foster, and Bill McMillan aka Billy Mac who head up the Mid South Sports Network since 1990. Interviews with coaches, and updated scores from other games going on around the area were broadcast on the "Taco Bell Scoreboard". With the 2015 fall season, DK Sports Media took over the broadcast of The Friday Night Football Game of the Week on WFNC. Trey Edge called the play by play and Bill Boyette did color commentary and the sideline interviews. Mid South Sports later moved to WAZZ 1490 AM and Sunny 94.3 FM, owned by the Beasley Broadcast Group.

=== Switch to Talk Radio ===
In 2009, WFNC became the first talk radio station in the region. Bob Kwesell of WPTF in Raleigh, began broadcasting "Wrestle with Kwesell" on WFNC and WAAV in Wilmington, North Carolina, on December 29, 1986.

4 years after the debut of Rush Limbaugh, Alan Colmes, and Dean Edell on WFNC, political commentator Charles Adler replaced Colmes and Edell. From 1995 to 2001, WFNC aired the syndicated advice program hosted by Dr. Laura Schlessinger.

=== Sale to Cumulus ===
In 1999, Cape Fear Broadcasting announced the sale of its stations to Cumulus Media. This sale was challenged by Ocean Broadcasting of Wilmington, North Carolina, because it would give Cumulus 6 FMs and an AM in Wilmington, and about 55 percent of market revenue. Despite the objection, the sale was completed in May 2001. The new ownership stopped doing daily editorials

In 2000, Neal Boortz of WSB Atlanta replaced Terry Jordan's local talk show as Jordan became engineer for all Cumulus radio stations. This left only two local talk shows in the daily schedule.

The station featured a popular weekly sports talk show on Monday nights, "The Powerade Press Box, with Brett & the Bad Boy." It was co-hosted by Allen Smothers (aka "The Bad Boy of Sports Radio") and local newspaper columnist Brett Friedlander. After Christmas in 2001, Sean Hannity replaced Dr. Laura.

Gilbert Baez of WTVD channel 11 began hosting the morning show in late in 2002. Thompson, the last of the station's longtime hosts, left in 2003 after 28 years and ended up on WIDU in 2005. Stan Sandler hosted "Soundoff" until that show was replaced with "The WFNC Newsmakers' Hour" in November. Dr. Sandler continued to host his popular "Stan the History Man," show which debuted in 2002.

Logo before 103.5 HD2 simulcast

Thompson returned to WFNC as news director and co-host, with program director Jim Cooke, doing a morning call-in show, on August 25, 2008. He replaced Laura Chavis-Price. In February 2009, Thompson was let go.

On June 1, 2010, WFNC dropped "Fayetteville's Morning News", on the air since 1976. Among the voices heard on this program: Johnny Joyce, Dan Mitchell, Alex Lekas, Lisa Schell, Liz Proctor, Gilbert Baez, Paul Michels, Rick Jensen, George Breece, Steve Blackmon, and Laura Chavis-Price. Jim Cooke continued to anchor local news. Curtis Wright later hosted a conservative talk radio morning show on both WFNC, Fayetteville, and Cumulus station WAAV, Wilmington: "Curtis Wright on the Beat". Curtis has been a popular Talk Radio host with "The Morning Beat with Curtis Wright", previously heard on WLTT/WNTB-FM in Wilmington. Wright is the founder of the North Carolina Coastal Conservative Coalition, The North Carolina Coastal Conservative Conference, and the "Stand-Up & Vote" candidates' forums. He was a featured writer on CarolinaTalkNetwork.com, an Internet site linking conservatives across North Carolina. In 2012, Curtis Wright was dropped from the line up on WFNC.
