= Interstate 95 in North Carolina =

Highway in North Carolina, US

Interstate 95
- Blue Star Memorial Highway
- I-95 highlighted in red

Route information
- Maintained by NCDOT
- Length: 181.36 mi (291.87 km)
- Existed: 1958–present
- NHS: Entire route

Major junctions
- South end: I-95 at the South Carolina state line near Rowland
- US 301 / US 501 near Rowland; I-74 / US 74 near Lumberton; I-295 near Parkton; I-295 / US 13 in Eastover; US 421 / NC 55 in Dunn; I-40 near Benson; US 70 in Selma; I-587 / I-795 / US 264 near Wilson; US 64 in Rocky Mount; US 158 in Roanoke Rapids
- North end: I-95 at the Virginia state line near Pleasant Hill

Location
- Country: United States
- State: North Carolina
- Counties: Robeson, Cumberland, Harnett, Johnston, Wilson, Nash, Halifax, Northampton

Highway system
- Interstate Highway System; Main; Auxiliary; Suffixed; Business; Future; North Carolina Highway System; Interstate; US; State; Scenic
← NC 94	→ NC 96

Interstate 95 (I-95) is a part of the Interstate Highway System that runs along the East Coast of the United States from Miami, Florida, to the Canada–United States border at Houlton, Maine. The total interstate runs for 1,924 miles (3,096 km). In the state of North Carolina, the route runs for 181.36 miles (291.87 km) from the South Carolina border near Rowland to the Virginia border near Pleasant Hill. The highway serves the cities of Lumberton, Fayetteville, Wilson, Rocky Mount, and Roanoke Rapids. The route goes through a mostly rural area of the state, avoiding most of the major metro areas of North Carolina. It forms the informal border between the Piedmont and Atlantic Plain regions of the state.

== History ==
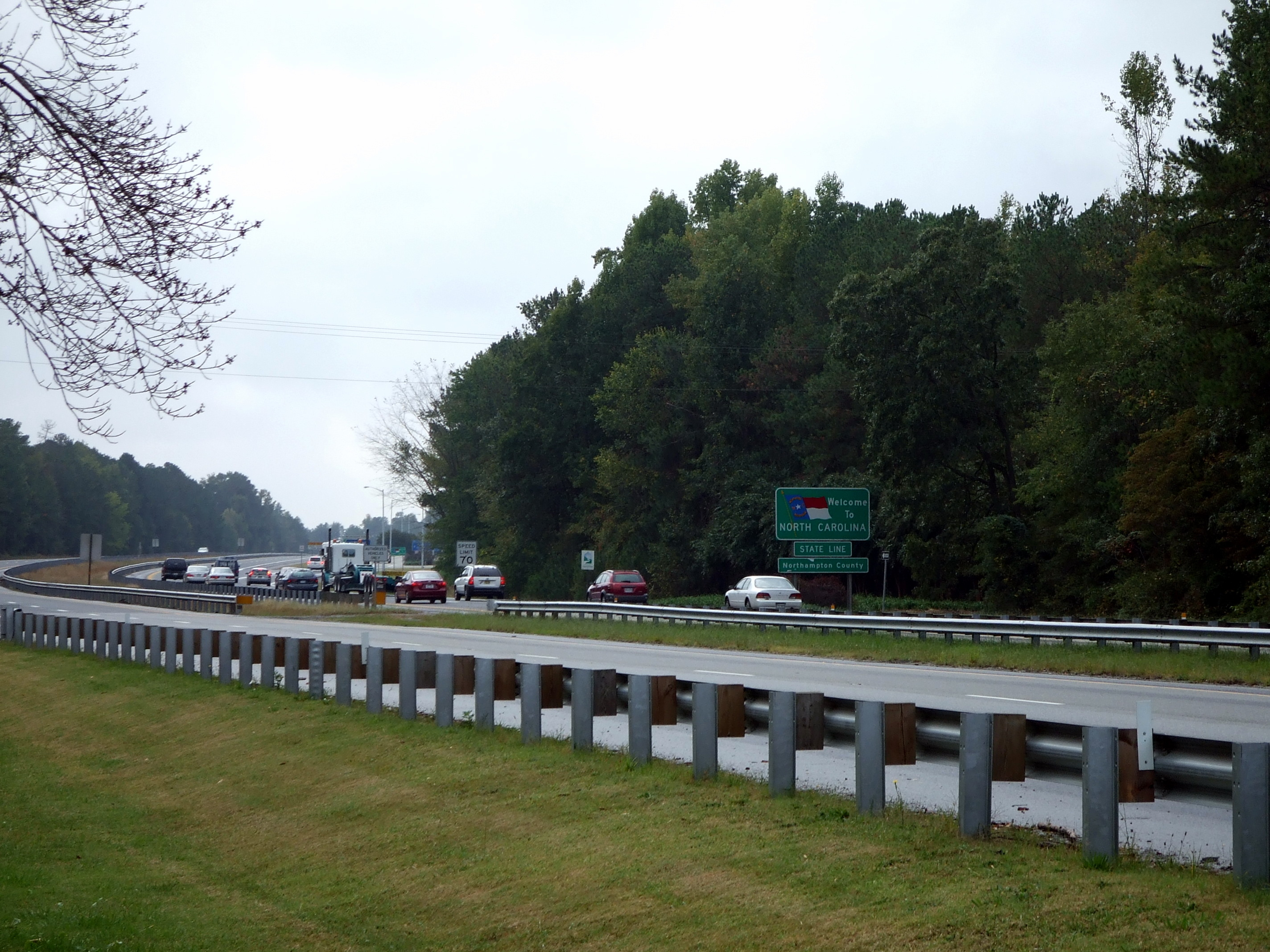
I-95 entering into North Carolina from Virginia

Established in 1956, as part of the Federal-Aid Highway Act of 1956, I-95 was routed along or near existing US 301 throughout the state of North Carolina. By 1961, two stretches of the Interstate opened: from mile marker 56, in Fayetteville, to milemarker 107, near Kenly; the other a small bypass near St. Pauls. In 1964, the St. Pauls section extended further south into Lumberton; while another small stretch opened from US 158, in Roanoke Rapids, to the Virginia state line. In 1969, I-95 was extended further south from Roanoke Rapids to exit 145, in Rocky Mount (later used for North Carolina Highway 4 [NC 4]). In 1973, I-95 was completed from St. Pauls to the South Carolina state line.

By the mid-1970s, I-95 had two gaps along its route in Fayetteville and Kenly–Gold Rock. In May 1978, two I-95 Bus. loops were established, both overlapping US 301, to help connect through the gaps and make I-95 appear as one continuous route throughout the state. In November 1978, the first gap to be completed was the Kenly–Gold Rock section. The final section of I-95 was completed in 1980, an easterly bypass of Fayetteville.

=== Tolls ===
The idea of tolling I-95 started in 2001 as a way to pay for improvements along the route. In 2003, state officials sought permission from the Federal Highway Administration (FHWA) for a plan that would cost $3 billion (equivalent to $4.89 billion in 2024) and put tollbooths every 30 miles (48 km) along the entire route. However, this was quickly killed by Governor Mike Easley, who did not support tolls.

In 2006, when the Virginia General Assembly passed the resolution calling for an interstate compact to build a toll highway, North Carolina was asked to join in on the compact of putting tolls along the entire length of I-95 in both states. Again, this was stopped by Easley, who did not see the benefit in such a compact and reiterated his opposition of tolls along I-95.

In 2010, North Carolina leaders revived talks on tolling I-95, submitting a request to the FHWA to toll the entire route. Approval would be considered after an environmental assessment and other conditions. Support has grown in a number of factors including the fact that the Interstate is mostly rural and used predominantly by out-of-state drivers.

On January 20, 2012, NCDOT received final approval of the environmental assessment for improvements along I-95 in North Carolina. The following recommendations were made:

- Widen I-95 to eight lanes (four lanes in each direction) from exit 31 to exit 81;
- Widen the remaining sections of I-95 to six lanes (three lanes in each direction);
- Make necessary repairs to pavement;
- Raise and rebuild bridges;
- Improve interchanges; and
- Bring I-95 up to current safety standards for Interstates.

It is estimated to cost $4.4 billion (equivalent to $5.92 billion in 2024) with recommendation that it should be paid through tolls. Construction would begin in two phases: phase 1 (exits 31–81) would begin in 2016 with tolls starting after completion; phase 2 would begin in 2019, which covers the remainder of the Interstate. With a possible 2019 start date for the tolls, NCDOT plans to install nine overhead toll collection sensors every 20 miles (32 km) with additional toll collection sensors at exits before tolls (to reduce drivers from jumping off and on at each toll); main toll stations will charge 20 miles (32 km) each while exit tolls will charge 10 miles (16 km) each. Gaps along the route, where no toll collectors are located, will allow local traffic to utilize the Interstate toll free. Though the toll rates have not been established, a NCDOT report suggest charging $0.192 per mile ($0.119/km) for cars in the phase 1 section, with a much lower rate of $0.064 per mile ($0.040/km) on phase 2 sections; which would work out to be $19.20 from border to border (trucks with three axles or more will be charged more). Drivers that do not carry a toll transponder (i.e., NC Quick Pass) will have their license numbers recorded by cameras and will be billed by mail, at a higher toll rate.

As of June 5, 2018, a share of $147 million (equivalent to $180 million in 2024) in federal grant money provided by the Trump administration was being used to partially fund upgrades to I-95.

== Route description ==
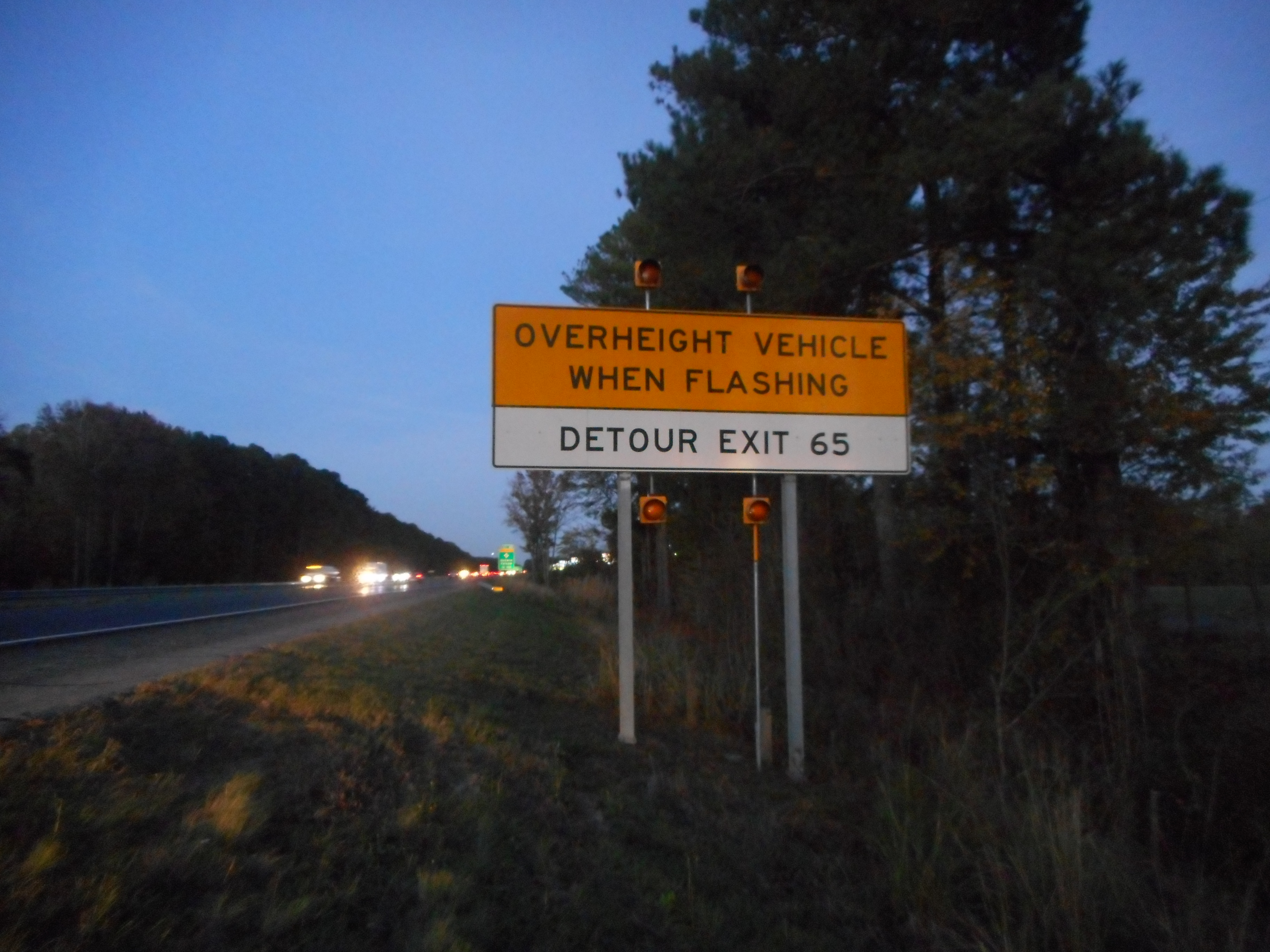
A section of I-95 in the state with low overpasses, requiring detours for tall vehicles

I-95 is designated a Blue Star Memorial Highway for its entire length in North Carolina. It enters the state at the South Carolina state line, just north of the South of the Border attraction and just to the south of the town of Rowland. Traveling mostly northeasterly from the border, the freeway is joined in an overlap with US Highway 301 (US 301) at exit 10, and then I-95/US 301 intersects I-74 in Lumberton. Together, I-95 and US 301 serve as the main route through town and pass over a bridge over the Lumber River just before exit 19. On the north side of town, US 301 leaves at exit 22. From there, I-95 turns due northward through a rural area of the state, past the small farming community of St. Pauls. I-95 serves as the eastern bypass of Fayetteville where I-95 Business (I-95 Bus.), an older alignment, connects I-95 to downtown Fayetteville.

Remaining east of Fayetteville, I-95 passes over some unremarkable bridges over the Cape Fear River just north of the interchange with North Carolina Highway 87 (exit 46). I-95 Business returns to I-95 at exit 56 (southbound only) near Eastover, only to be followed by the northern terminus of Interstate 295 and southern terminus of U.S. Route 13 both of which are at exit 58.

I-95 intersects I-40 in Benson, then runs along bridges over the Neuse River between Four Oaks and Smithfield, the latter of which contains a notable retail outlet complex. Later, it has interchanges with US 264 in Wilson, and US 64 in Rocky Mount. I-40, US 264 and US 64 are three of the main east–west routes in the eastern part of the state, though a fourth route (Interstate 42) is proposed to cross I-95 in Smithfield. The last city it passes is Roanoke Rapids and another pair of bridges over the same river that city was named after before leaving the state near the unincorporated community of Pleasant Hill at the Virginia border. For most of the route, I-95 is paralleled closely by US 301. Besides the overlap with US 301 between exits 10 and 22, there are interchanges with US 301 at exits 1, 25, 40, 56, 90, and 107.

=== Services ===
The North Carolina Department of Transportation (NCDOT) operate and maintain two welcome centers and six rest areas along I-95. Welcome centers, which have a travel information facility on site, are located at milemarkers 5 (northbound) and 181 (southbound); rest areas are located at milemarkers 47 (north and southbound), 99 (north and southbound), and 142 (north and southbound). Common at all locations are public restrooms, public telephones, vending machines, picnic areas, and barbecue grills.

The North Carolina Department of Public Safety (NCDPS) operate and maintain four truck inspection/weigh stations along I-95. The Robeson County stations are located on both north- and southbound at milemarker 24, each has one fixed scale. The Halifax County stations are located on both north- and southbound at milemarker 151, each has two fixed scales.

=== Dedicated and memorial names ===
I-95 in North Carolina feature numerous dedicated or memorialized bridges, interchanges, and stretches of freeway.

- Blue Star Memorial Highway: official North Carolina honorary name of I-95 throughout the state (approved on June 13, 1980).
- Congressman G K Butterfield Highway: official North Carolina name of I-95 from exit 173, in Roanoke Rapids, to the Virginia state line. It honors the U.S. Congressman who served from 2004 to 2022; it was dedicated on October 23, 2024.
- Dick Fleming Freeway: official North Carolina name of I-95 from exit 95, in Smithfield, to exit 97, in Selma, in Johnston County. He is honored as being a visionary businessperson, who help spur businesses along the two exits and the establishment of Carolina Pottery Store in 1983, which later grew to become Carolina Premium Outlets (approved January 2013; dedicated March 22, 2013).
- Hector MacLean Highway: official North Carolina name of I-95 within Lumberton city limits (approved on October 3, 1997).

=== Related routes ===
There are two auxiliary routes and one business loop in the state. I-295 connects I-95 to US 401 in Fayetteville and serves as a full bypass for I-95 in the city. I-795 connects Goldsboro to Wilson. I-95 Bus. goes through central Fayetteville. I-95 used to have I-495 connecting to Raleigh which is now part of I-87.

== Future ==
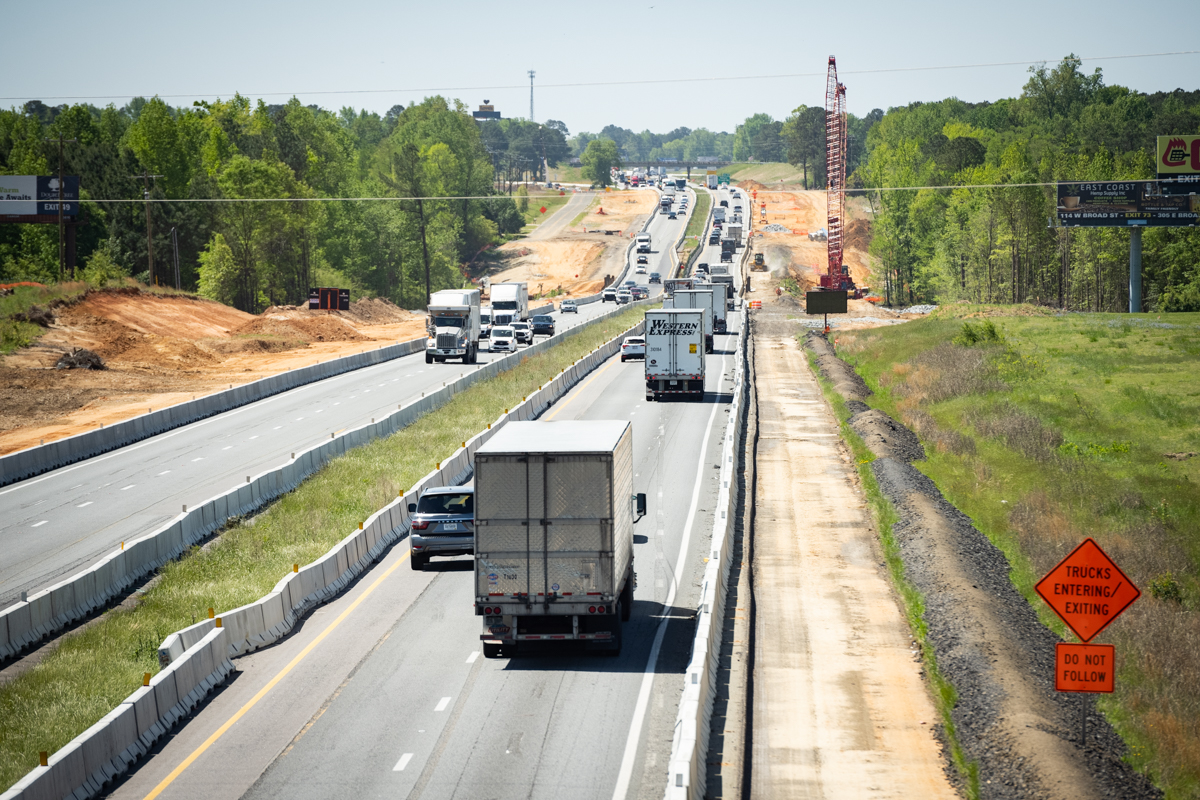
Widening of I-95 in 2023

As of 2022, the entirety of I-95 is designated for widening from four lanes to either six or eight lanes and the reconfiguring of numerous interchanges. The project is being undertaken in several stages, with projects that, as of 2022, have been funded and are in various stages of completion, covering the route from milemarker 13 near Lumberton to milemarker 81 north of Fayetteville.

Begun in January 2020, a project is under way to expand I-95 from four to eight lanes between exits 55 and 71, north of Fayetteville. This includes the reconstruction of several bridges, overpasses, underpasses, and interchanges both on I-95 and on crossing roads. When complete, the freeway will be a total of eight lanes through this stretch. As of 2022, the project is scheduled to be completed in 2026. The project is partially funded by the Infrastructure for Rebuilding America (INFRA).

Scheduled to begin in mid-2022 is another project to widen I-95 to eight lanes from the I-74 interchange (exit 13) to exit 22. It is also expected to be completed in 2029.

The next two phases of the widening project along I-95 includes sections Cumberland and Robeson counties between exit 22 and exit 40 and in Harnett and Johnston counties between exit 71 and exit 81. As of 2018, funding was expected for the Cumberland and Robeson section after 2027 and construction scheduled for the Harnett and Johnston counties section in 2026.

== Exit list ==
County	Location	mi	km	Exit	Destinations	Notes
North Carolina–South Carolina line		0.00– 0.06	0.00– 0.097		I-95 south – Florence	Continuation into South Carolina
North Carolina–South Carolina line		0.00– 0.06	0.00– 0.097	1	US 301 / US 501 – Rowland, Laurinburg, Dillon	Signed as exits 1A (south) and 1B (north) southbound; exits 1 northbound and 1A southbound are in South Carolina
Robeson		2.32	3.73	2	NC 130 to NC 904 – Rowland, Fairmont	
Robeson		7.16	11.52	7	Raynham Road – McDonald, Raynham	
Robeson		10.40	16.74	10	US 301 south – Raynham	Southern end of US 301 overlap
Robeson	Lumberton	13.01	20.94	13	I-74 / US 74 – Whiteville, Wilmington, Laurinburg, Rockingham	Signed as exits 13A (east) and 13B (west); cloverleaf interchange with collector/distributor lanes
Robeson	Lumberton	13.69	22.03	14	US 74	Permanently closed in 2007; replaced by exit 13
Robeson	Lumberton	17.03	27.41	17	NC 72 / NC 711 – Lumberton, Pembroke, Red Springs	Southern terminus of NC 711
Robeson	Lumberton	18.74	30.16	19	Carthage Road	
Robeson	Lumberton	19.85	31.95	20	NC 211 to NC 41 – Lumberton, Red Springs, Fairmont	
Robeson	Lumberton	21.53	34.65	22	US 301 north – Lumberton	Northern end of US 301 overlap
Robeson		25.04	40.30	25	US 301	
Robeson	St. Pauls	31.39	50.52	31	NC 20 – St. Pauls, Raeford	
Robeson	St. Pauls	33.02	53.14	33	US 301 to NC 71 – Parkton, St. Pauls	
Robeson		38.13	61.36	38	I-295 north – Fort Bragg, Pope Field	Southern terminus of I-295; trumpet interchange
Cumberland		40.24	64.76	40	I-95 BL north to US 301 – Fayetteville, Fort Bragg	Northbound exit and southbound entrance
Cumberland	Hope Mills	41.28	66.43	41	Hope Mills, Parkton	Former NC 59
Cumberland		43.81	70.51	44	Snow Hill Road – Fayetteville Regional Airport	
Cumberland		45.98	74.00	46	NC 87 – Elizabethtown, Fayetteville	Signed as exits 46A (south) and 46B (north); cloverleaf interchange with collector/distributor lanes
Cumberland	Fayetteville	48.93	78.75	49	NC 53 / NC 210 – Fayetteville	
Cumberland	Vander	51.58	83.01	52	NC 24 – Fayetteville, Clinton	Signed as exits 52A (east) and 52B (west); cloverleaf interchange with C/D lanes
Cumberland	Eastover	54.52	87.74	55	Murphy Road	
Cumberland	Eastover	54.98	88.48	56	I-95 BL south to US 301 – Fayetteville, Fort Bragg	Southbound exit and northbound entrance
Cumberland	Eastover	57.86	93.12	58	I-295 south / US 13 north to US 401 – Newton Grove, Fort Bragg	Signed as exits 58A (north) and 58B (south) northbound; northern terminus of I-295; southern terminus of US 13
Cumberland		61.17	98.44	61	Wade–Steadman Road – Wade	Formerly signed as Wade
Cumberland		65.22	104.96	65	NC 82 – Godwin, Falcon	
Harnett		69.52	111.88	70	Bud Hawkins Road	Formerly signed as SR 1811
Harnett		70.74	113.84	71	Long Branch Road	
Harnett	Dunn	72.38	116.48	72	Pope Road	Renumbered as exit 73 in October 2025.
Harnett	Dunn	72.99	117.47	73	US 421 / NC 55 – Dunn, Clinton, Newton Grove Pope Road	Signed as Pope Road (former exit 72) northbound and US 421/NC 55 southbound. Drivers must take exit 73 in order to access Pope Road. Split diamond interchange formerly a full diamond interchange before being split due to numerous accidents.
Harnett		74.87	120.49	75	Jonesboro Road	
Harnett		76.84	123.66	77	Hodges Chapel Road	Was formerly named Parker Road and Dennings Road before c. 2001.
Johnston	Benson	79.42	127.81	79	NC 50 / NC 242 to NC 27 – Benson, Newton Grove	Formerly a parclo interchange before being redesigned in 2005. Will become once again a diamond interchange with one roundabout on northbound side in late 2027. Formerly signed as Benson southbound until signs were replaced in summer 2005. NC 27 not signed northbound.
Johnston	Benson	80.95	130.28	81	I-40 – Wilmington, Raleigh, Durham	Signed southbound as exits 81A (west) and 81B (east) Formerly right lane exit only on northbound side until November 2025, then converted to a single exit due to numerous fatal accidents. Opened fully on August 26, 1990, whereas eastbound exits were opened in 1984.
Johnston	Four Oaks	87.50	140.82	87	Keen Road – Four Oaks	Formerly signed as Hockaday Mill Road (northbound) and Keen Road (southbound) before being redesigned in 2004. Traffic lights were removed and concrete islands and pavement remained in 2004, still visible in Google Street View in 2007 before being reconstructed in 2017. Former Split diamond interchange before being reconfigured to a diamond interchange.
Johnston	Four Oaks	89.70	144.36	90	US 301 / US 701 south / NC 96 – Newton Grove	Leads to Bentonville Civil War Battleground Partial diamond interchange being reconfigured in late 2020s to a diamond interchange due to numerous accidents.
Johnston	Smithfield	93.04	149.73	93	Brogden Road – Smithfield	Split folded diamond interchange.
Johnston	Smithfield	94.75	152.49	95	US 70 Bus. – Smithfield, Goldsboro	Will become US 70 again due to Interstate 42 being constructed to replace said highway. Former partial cloverleaf interchange becoming diverging diamond interchange in 2027. Formerly had no traffic signals before adding one on northbound exits in May 2025.
Johnston	Smithfield–Selma line			96	I-42	Future interchange; I-42 exit 17 (unfunded) Will become cloverleaf interchange with collector-distributor lanes. Requires new alignment of both Interstate 95 and Interstate 42 (US 70 Bypass) in order to comply with interstate standards.
Johnston	Selma	96.81	155.80	97	US 70 – Selma, Pine Level, Goldsboro	Southern terminus of unsigned NC 39 One of the few highways to not connect to another interstate, violating interstate standards.
Johnston	Selma	98.00	157.72	98	Pine Level–Selma Road – Selma	Exit was widened north due to increased locomotive activity.
Johnston	Micro	101.28	162.99	101	Pittman Road	
Johnston	Micro	102.43	164.85	102	Main Street – Micro	
Johnston	Kenly	104.50	168.18	105	Bagley Road	
Johnston	Kenly	105.88	170.40	106	Truck Stop Road	
Johnston	Kenly	107.12	172.39	107	US 301 – Kenly, Wilson	Leads to Gov. Charles B. Aycock Birthplace Former northern terminus of Interstate 95 and Interstate 95 Business before being extended to exit 145 in 1978.
Wilson		116.33	187.21	116	NC 42 – Wilson, Clayton	
Wilson	Wilson	119.27	191.95	119	I-587 east / I-795 south / US 264 – Wilson, Greenville, Goldsboro, Raleigh	Northern terminus of I-795; western terminus of I-587; signed as exits 119A (I-587 east/I-795 south/US 264 east) and 119B (US 264 west); cloverleaf interchange with collector/distributor roadways
Wilson	Wilson	121.37	195.33	121	US 264 Alt. – Wilson, Sims	Former US 264 before being realigned in 1997.
Nash		126.82	204.10	127	NC 97 – Rocky Mount–Wilson Regional Airport	
Nash		132.27	212.87	132	To NC 58 / Sandy Cross Road	
Nash	Rocky Mount			138A	Sunset Avenue	Interchange opened on December 12, 2025
Nash	Rocky Mount	138.32	222.60	138B-C	US 64 – Nashville, Raleigh, Rocky Mount, Tarboro	Signed as exits 138B (west) 138C (east); cloverleaf interchange with collector/distributor roadways; leads to NC Aquarium and Cape Hatteras National Seashore
Nash	Dortches	140.69	226.42	141	NC 43 – Red Oak	
Nash	Rocky Mount	144.99	233.34	145	NC 4 / NC 48 to US 301 – Gold Rock, Rocky Mount	Former southern terminus of Interstate 95 and Interstate 95 Business Former trumpet interchange before being reconfigured into a diamond interchange with roundabouts.
Nash		149.63	240.81	150	NC 33 – Whitakers	
Halifax		153.54	247.10	154	NC 481 – Enfield	
Halifax		160.37	258.09	160	NC 561 – Halifax	Leads to Medoc Mountain State Park
Halifax		167.56	269.66	168	NC 903 – Halifax	
Halifax	Roanoke Rapids	170.57	274.51	171	NC 125 – Roanoke Rapids	
Halifax	Roanoke Rapids	172.81	278.11	173	US 158 – Roanoke Rapids, Weldon	
Northampton		175.67	282.71	176	NC 46 – Gaston, Garysburg	
Northampton		179.87	289.47	180	NC 48 – Gaston	
Northampton		181.36	291.87		I-95 north – Richmond	Continuation into Virginia
1.000 mi = 1.609 km; 1.000 km = 0.621 mi: Closed/former; Concurrency terminus; Incomplete access; Unopened

== See also ==
- Cape Fear River
- Lake Gaston
- Lumber River
- Neuse River
- Roanoke River

Interstate 95
Previous state: South Carolina	North Carolina	Next state: Virginia
