= North Carolina Highway 561 =

State highway in North Carolina, US

North Carolina Highway 561

- Route of NC 561 highlighted in red

Route information
- Maintained by NCDOT
- Length: 99.5 mi (160.1 km)
- Existed: 1925–present

Major junctions
- West end: US 401 / NC 39 in Louisburg
- I-95 near Beaverdam; US 301 / NC 125 / NC 903 in Pender; US 258 / NC 305 in Rich Square; US 13 / NC 42 in Ahoskie
- East end: NC 45 near Harrellsville

Location
- Country: United States
- State: North Carolina
- Counties: Franklin, Nash, Halifax, Northampton, Hertford

Highway system
- North Carolina Highway System; Interstate; US; State; Scenic
← NC 540	→ NC 581

North Carolina Highway 561 (NC 561) is a 100-mile-long (160 km) North Carolina state highway and a rural traffic artery connecting Louisburg and Ahoskie with many small-to-medium-sized towns in the Down East and Coastal Plain regions within minutes from the Virginia state line. NC 561 is a spur of NC 56, although the two highways never actually intersect.

== Route description ==
The eastern terminus of NC 561 is at NC 45 in Harrellsville and proceeds west to Ahoskie where it meets with U.S. Route 13 (US 13) and NC 42 just outside town. All three are concurrent along Memorial Drive upon entering Ahoskie until reaching Academy Street. From there, NC 42 turns left and the other two highways turn right bypassing downtown Ahoskie to the west. NC 561 turns left onto West 1st Street, continuing westward towards Rich Square. There are two junctions along the way (NC 11 and NC 461) before merging with NC 305 near the Hertford/Northampton county line. The two highways run concurrent into Rich Square, passing NC 35 to junction with US 258. As NC 305 continues straight towards Jackson, NC 561 turns left and joins US 258 at it passes through Rich Square heading south towards Scotland Neck.

The two highways pass NC 308 south of Rich Square on its way into Halifax County, where NC 561 turns right and proceeds towards Halifax meeting NC 481 in Tillery. NC 561 turns right onto US 301, NC 903 and NC 125 just south of Halifax and then turn left a short ways up and continue west towards Brinkleyville. The highway makes a right at Beaver Dam, just before its junction with Interstate 95 (exit 160 off the Interstate). NC 561 meets NC 4 and NC 48 at Brinkleyville, where NC 4 runs concurrent with NC 561 past Medoc Mountain State Park. The highway breaks off heading north to Littleton as NC 561 continues west to Hollister. NC 43 joins the highway past Hollister for a short distance before NC 561 breaks off and travels to Centerville, crossing NC 58 in town. NC 561 continues southwest into Louisburg where it meets its western terminus at US 401 and NC 39, about 3,000 feet (0.91 km) north of NC 56.

== History ==
NC 561 was established in 1925 as a new primary route between NC 56 in Louisburg, and NC 58 in Centerville. Around 1928, NC 561 was extended east as new routing to US 17-1/NC 40 near Halifax. In 1932, another extension east on new routing to US 258/NC 12 near Spring Hill. Between 1959–1963, NC 561 was extended north along US 258 to Rich Square and then east along NC 305 until past Mintons Store where it split on new primary routing to Ahoskie. After a short concurrency with both US 13 and NC 45, it traveled east on new primary routing to end at NC 45, near Harrellsville. By 1963, NC 561 discontinued going to Main Street in Louisburg and was truncated at the current western terminus at US 401/NC 39.

== Junction list ==
County	Location	mi	km	Destinations	Notes
Franklin	Louisburg	0.0	0.0	US 401 / NC 39 (Bickett Boulevard) – Henderson, Raleigh	Western terminus
Franklin	Centerville	11.9	19.2	NC 58 – Nashville, Warrenton	
Nash	No major junctions				
Halifax		20.2	32.5	NC 43 south – Rocky Mount	South end of NC 43 overlap
Halifax	Essex	22.3	35.9	NC 43 north – Warrenton	North end of NC 43 overlap
Halifax		26.0	41.8	NC 4 north – Littleton	North end of NC 4 overlap
Halifax	Brinkleyville	29.2	47.0	NC 4 south / NC 48 – Rocky Mount, Roanoke Rapids	South end of NC 4 overlap
Halifax		37.0	59.5	I-95 – Rocky Mount, Roanoke Rapids, Weldon	Exit 160 (I-95)
Halifax		45.3	72.9	US 301 / NC 125 / NC 903 north – Halifax	North end of US 301 / NC 125 / NC 903 overlap
Halifax	Pender	45.7	73.5	US 301 / NC 125 / NC 903 south – Rocky Mount	South end of US 301 / NC 125 / NC 903 overlap
Halifax	Tillery	51.2	82.4	NC 481 west – Enfield	Eastern terminus of NC 481
Halifax		60.9	98.0	US 258 south – Scotland Neck	South end of US 258 overlap
Northampton		68.1	109.6	NC 308 east – Roxobel	
Northampton	Rich Square	69.7	112.2	US 258 / NC 305 north – Murfreesboro, Jackson	North end of US 258 / NC 305 overlap
Northampton	Mintons Store	75.2	121.0	NC 35 north – Woodland	
Hertford		75.9	122.1	NC 305 south – Aulander	South end of NC 305 overlap
Hertford	St. John	81.3	130.8	NC 461 east – Winton	
Hertford		85.4	137.4	NC 11 – Aulander, Murfreesboro	
Hertford	Ahoskie	87.3	140.5	US 13 north (Academy Street) – Winton	North end of US 13 overlap
Hertford	Ahoskie	87.8	141.3	NC 42 west (Academy Street) – Aulander	West end of NC 42 overlap
Hertford	Ahoskie	89.4	143.9	US 13 south / NC 42 east – Powellsville	South end of US 13 and east end of NC 42 overlap
Hertford		99.5	160.1	NC 45 – Harrellsville, Winton	Eastern terminus
1.000 mi = 1.609 km; 1.000 km = 0.621 mi: Concurrency terminus
