= U.S. Route 301 in North Carolina =

Highway in North Carolina

U.S. Highway 301
- US 301 highlighted in red

Route information
- Auxiliary route of US 1
- Maintained by NCDOT
- Length: 193.7 mi (311.7 km)
- Existed: 1932–present

Major junctions
- South end: US 301 / US 501 at the South Carolina state line near Rowland
- I-95 (multiple times); I-74 / US 74 near Lumberton; I-795 near Wilson; I-587 / US 264 near Wilson; US 64 in Rocky Mount
- North end: US 301 at the Virginia state line near Pleasant Hill

Location
- Country: United States
- State: North Carolina
- Counties: Robeson, Cumberland, Harnett, Johnston, Wilson, Nash, Edgecombe, Halifax, Northampton

Highway system
- United States Numbered Highway System; List; Special; Divided; North Carolina Highway System; Interstate; US; State; Scenic
← NC 295	→ NC 304

U.S. Route 301 (US 301) is a north–south United States highway that runs for 194 miles (312 km) in North Carolina from the South Carolina state line near Rowland to the Virginia state line near Pleasant Hill. The entire route parallels I-95. From the southern border to Hope Mills, it runs very close to I-95, crossing it several times and having a short concurrency with the freeway in Lumberton. From Hope Mills to Eastover, North Carolina it follows Interstate 95 Business, a partial freeway that passes through the center of Fayetteville. Passing through towns such as Dunn, Benson, Smithfield, and Selma that are bypassed by I-95, numerous local businesses targeted at I-95 travellers line this stretch, rarely does it veer more than a fraction of a mile from I-95. At Kenly, it leaves its close parallel of I-95, taking a route approximately 5 miles east of I-95 and passing through the center of the cities of Wilson and Rocky Mount. North of Rocky Mount it passes through several small towns, including Whitakers, Enfield, Halifax, and Weldon before passing into Virginia near Pleasant Hill. Through Rocky Mount the route divides into a Business and Bypass route, and there is also a short business loop in Halifax.

== Route description ==
US 301 generally follows the same route as I-95 through North Carolina; they both enter the state near the South of the Border attraction in South Carolina, overlap together around Lumberton, and share multiple interchanges before reaching Virginia.

US 301 enters North Carolina at the South Carolina border, south of Rowland and north of South of the Border. The highway enters the state as a four-lane divided highway, concurrent with US 501. It immediately meets I-95 (I-95 exit 1) at an interchange partially in North Carolina and partially in South Carolina. US 301 and US 501 continue north of the interchange toward Rowland, and the highway narrows to a two-lane undivided roadway. It goes northwest until passing through the Bracey Swamp where both routes curve northeast running parallel to the CSX South End Subdivision until they enter Rowland where the concurrency with US 501 ends. US 301 then makes two sharp right curves and then one left curve where it passes through Raynham before merging with I-95 from exit 10 to exit 22. North of Lumberton, it crosses I-95 twice before entering Fayetteville, overlapped with I-95 Business along Eastern Boulevard. North of Eastover, it encounters a connecting road to US 13 just before it crosses under North Carolina Highway 295 (NC 295), also known as Future I-295, as it parallels I-95 to its immediate west. Traversing through the cities of Wade, Godwin, Dunn, and Benson, where it crosses over I-40 without an interchange; it joins the southbound right-in/right-out interchange from Exit 90 on I-95 before serving as the northern terminus of US 701 in Four Oaks, and starts a concurrency with North Carolina Highway 96 (NC 96). From there it continues on through Smithfield, then Selma where the NC 96 concurrency ends, and then passes through Micro. At Kenly, US 301 crosses under I-95 then moves away from that interstate again, into the cities of Wilson, Elm City, Sharpsburg, and Rocky Mount, before returning to a more easterly parallel to the Interstate. US 301 continues north through the towns of Enfield, Halifax, and Weldon, where it joins US 158 in an overlap with a bridge over the Roanoke River, then leaves the overlap as it enters Garysburg. The last major intersection with US 301 in the state is with NC 48 in Pleasant Hill before crossing into Virginia.

== History ==
US 301 was established in 1932, replacing US 217 from the South Carolina state line to Wilson, and US 17-1 from Wilson to the Virginia state line. In 1934, NC 22 and NC 40 were dropped along the route.

Route changes along US 301 started in the early-1950s with a new bypass (Eastern Boulevard) around central Fayetteville and a new bypass west of Halifax. In 1955 or 1956, a new bypass (Ward Boulevard) was built east of Wilson. By 1958, US 301 was widen to a four-lane road around Lumberton, Fayetteville, and between Kenly and Rocky Mount; it was also at this time that Elm City was bypassed. In 1961, I-95 was overlapped with US 301 on the Lumberton bypass. By 1984, US 301 was extended south along I-95 to exit 10, keeping its routing through Rowland.

From 1978 to 1986, US 301 was overlapped by a second I-95 Business Loop between Kenly and Rocky Mount, which also used part of what is today an extension of NC 4.

=== U.S. Route 217 ===
U.S. Highway 217
- Location: SC state line-Wilson, NC
- Length: 126.7 mi (203.9 km)
- Existed: 1926–1932

U.S. Route 217 (US 217) was an original U.S. Highway, established in 1926, and was completely overlapped with NC 22. The original highway continued south into South Carolina to end in Pee Dee. US 217 entered from South Carolina south of Rowland where it went north through Rowland and into Lumberton via Hilly Branch Road and 5th Street. Going north on Pine Street and Fayetteville Road, it connected with Fayetteville where it went north on Gillespie Street, then east on Person Street, before it went north again on Dunn Road. Entering Dunn on Clinton Street, it went west on Cumberland Street (NC 60), then north on Ellis Avenue. It entered Smithfield on 3rd Street, and went east on Market Street then north again on 8th Street. As it approached Wilson from the south, it ended at US 17-1/NC 40 (Dixie Inn Road). In 1932, the entire route was renumbered as part of US 301.

== Junction list ==
County	Location	mi	km	Exit	Destinations	Notes
North Carolina–South Carolina line		0.00	0.00		US 301 south / US 501 south – South of the Border, Dillon	Continuation into South Carolina
North Carolina–South Carolina line		0.00	0.00		I-95 – Lumberton, Fayetteville, Florence	I-95 exit 1
Robeson	Rowland	2.7	4.3		US 501 north / NC 130 – Laurinburg, Fairmont	North end of US 501 overlap
Robeson		11.8	19.0		I-95 south – Florence	South end of I-95 overlap; I-95 exit 10
Robeson	Lumberton	14.5	23.3	13	I-74 / US 74 – Whiteville, Wilmington, Laurinburg, Rockingham	Exit numbers follow I-95; signed as exits 13A (east) and 13B (west); I-74 exit 209
Robeson	Lumberton			14	US 74	Permanently closed in 2007; replaced by exit 13
Robeson	Lumberton	18.5	29.8	17	NC 72 / NC 711 north – Lumberton, Pembroke, Red Springs	Southern terminus of NC 711
Robeson	Lumberton	20.2	32.5	19	Carthage Road	
Robeson	Lumberton	21.4	34.4	20	NC 211 to NC 41 – Lumberton, Red Springs, Fairmont	
Robeson	Lumberton	23.0	37.0		I-95 north – Fayetteville	North end of I-95 overlap; I-95 exit 22
Robeson		27.0	43.5		I-95 – Lumberton, Fayetteville	I-95 exit 25
Robeson	Saint Pauls	33.2	53.4		NC 20 (Broad Street) – Lumber Bridge, Elizabethtown	
Robeson		35.5	57.1		I-95 – Lumberton, Fayetteville	Exit 33 (I-95)
Robeson		40.2	64.7		NC 71 south – Parkton, Lumber Bridge, Red Springs	
Cumberland		43.0	69.2		I-95 BL south to I-95 south – Lumberton	South end of I-95 BL overlap; interchange; southbound left exit and northbound entrance
Cumberland	Hope Mills	43.6	70.2		To I-95 / Main Street – Hope Mills	Interchange
Cumberland	Hope Mills	45.6	73.4		NC 162 west (Elk Road)	Eastern terminus of NC 162
Cumberland	Fayetteville	50.6	81.4		NC 87 (Martin Luther King Jr. Freeway) – Elizabethtown	NC 87 exit 102
Cumberland	Fayetteville	52.4	84.3		NC 24 / NC 210 to US 401 (Grove Street) – Roseboro	At-grade intersection; south end of freeway
Cumberland	Fayetteville	53.8	86.6	—	Middle Road	
Cumberland		55.6	89.5	—	Dobbins Holmes Road	
Cumberland	Eastover	57.3	92.2		I-95 BL north to I-95 north	North end of I-95 BL overlap; north end of freeway section
Cumberland	Eastover	60.2	96.9		Pembroke Lane to I-95 / US 13 – Newton Grove, Eastover Central Elementary School	To NC 295
Cumberland	Godwin	68.5	110.2		NC 82 (Main Street) – Erwin, Falcon	
Harnett	Dunn	76.4	123.0		US 421 / NC 55 (Cumberland Street) – Erwin, Lillington, Clinton	
Mingo Swamp					Bridge	
Johnston	Benson	83.2	133.9		NC 27 west / NC 50 / NC 242 south (Main Street) – Coats, Newton Grove	South end of NC 242 overlap
Johnston	Benson	83.7	134.7		NC 242 north to I-40	North end of NC 242 overlap
Johnston	Four Oaks	93.9	151.1		I-95 / US 701 south / NC 96 south – Benson, Rocky Mount, Newton Grove	Exit 90 (I-95); northern terminus of US 701; south end of NC 96 overlap
Johnston	Smithfield	98.4	158.4		US 70 Bus. / NC 210 (Market Street) – Goldsboro, Clayton	
Johnston	Selma	101.0	162.5		US 70 / NC 39 south – Clayton, Goldsboro	South end of NC 39 overlap
Johnston	Selma	102.5	165.0		NC 96 north (Richardson Street) – Zebulon	North end of NC 96 overlap
Johnston	Selma	103.4	166.4		NC 39 north – Bunn	North end of NC 39 overlap
Johnston	Kenly	112.0	180.2		I-95 – Smithfield, Rocky Mount	Exit 107 (I-95)
Johnston	Kenly	112.5	181.1		NC 222 (Second Street) – Fremont	
Wilson		114.7	184.6		NC 581 – Bailey, Goldsboro	
Wilson		123.2	198.3		I-795 – Goldsboro, Raleigh	Exit 5 (I-795)
Wilson		123.6	198.9		US 117 south – Fremont, Pikeville	Northern terminus of US 117
Wilson	Wilson	123.9	199.4		I-587 / US 264 – Greenville, Raleigh	Exit 43 (US 264)
Wilson	Wilson	126.6	203.7		US 264 Alt. west (Ward Boulevard west)	South end of US 264 Alt. overlap
Wilson	Wilson	128.2	206.3		US 264 Alt. east / NC 58 south (Martin Luther King Jr. Parkway) – Stantonsburg, Saratoga	North end of US 264 Alt. overlap; south end of NC 58 overlap
Wilson	Wilson	128.7	207.1		NC 58 north (Ward Boulevard north)	North end of NC 58 overlap
Wilson	Wilson	129.9	209.1		NC 42 (Herring Avenue) – Pinetops, Wilson	Interchange
Wilson		132.4	213.1		Rosebud Church Road	Interchange
Wilson		135.0	217.3		Langley Road – Elm City	Interchange
Nash		141.5	227.7		US 301 Bus. north (Tarboro Road)	Southern terminus of US 301 Bus.
Nash	Rocky Mount	143.4	230.8		NC 97 (Tarboro Road) – Raleigh	Interchange; to Rocky Mount-Wilson Regional Airport
Nash	Rocky Mount	146.6	235.9		US 64 Bus. – Rocky Mount, Nashville	Interchange; northbound exit via May Drive
Nash	Rocky Mount	147.2	236.9		US 64 – Tarboro, Raleigh	US 64 exit 468A
Nash	Rocky Mount	148.2	238.5		NC 43 / NC 48 to I-95	Interchange
Nash	Rocky Mount	150.0	241.4		US 301 Bus. south (Church Road)	Northern terminus of US 301 Bus.
Nash	Battleboro	153.5	247.0		NC 4 north to I-95	Partial interchange; northbound left exit and southbound entrance; southbound access via Red Oak-Battleboro Road
Nash	Whitakers	159.1	256.0		NC 33 west (Nash Street) – Red Oak	West end of NC 33 overlap
Nash	Whitakers	159.3	256.4		NC 33 east (Main Street) – Tarboro	East end of NC 33 overlap
Fishing Creek					Edgecombe-Halifax county line	
Halifax	Enfield	164.0	263.9		NC 481 west – Glenview	West end of NC 481 overlap
Halifax	Enfield	165.3	266.0		NC 481 Bus. west (Whitaker Street)	Eastern terminus of NC 481 Bus.
Halifax		167.1	268.9		NC 481 east – Tillery	East end of NC 481 overlap
Halifax		173.4	279.1		NC 125 south / NC 903 south – Scotland Neck	South end of NC 125/NC 903 overlap
Halifax		175.6	282.6		NC 561 east – Tillery	East end of NC 561 overlap
Halifax		176.0	283.2		NC 561 west – Brinkleyville, Louisburg	West end of NC 561 overlap
Halifax	Halifax	176.5	284.0		US 301 Bus. north (King Street)	Southern terminus of US 301 Bus.
Halifax	Halifax	177.1	285.0		NC 125 north / NC 903 north – Roanoke Rapids	North end of NC 125/NC 903 overlap
Halifax	Halifax	177.4	285.5		US 301 Bus. south (David Street)	Northern terminus of US 301 Bus.
Halifax	Weldon	184.0	296.1		US 158 west (Second Street) – Roanoke Rapids	West end of US 158 overlap
Roanoke River					Rockfish Capital Bridge	
Northampton	Garysburg	186.4	300.0		US 158 east – Jackson, Murfreesboro	East end of US 158 overlap
Northampton	Garysburg	186.8	300.6		NC 46 west / NC 186 west – Gaston	Eastern terminus of NC 46; south end of NC 186 overlap
Northampton	Garysburg	187.0	300.9		NC 186 east – Seaboard	North end of NC 186 overlap
Northampton	Pleasant Hill	193.0	310.6		NC 48 south – Gaston	Northern terminus of NC 48
Northampton		193.7	311.7		US 301 north – Emporia	Continuation into Virginia
1.000 mi = 1.609 km; 1.000 km = 0.621 mi: Closed/former; Concurrency terminus; Incomplete access

== See also ==
- Special routes of U.S. Route 301
- North Carolina Bicycle Route 5 - Concurrent with US 301 from Wade Stedman Road to Sisk Culbreth Road in Wade

U.S. Route 301
Previous state: South Carolina	North Carolina	Next state: Virginia
