= North Carolina Highway 48 =

State highway in North Carolina, US

North Carolina Highway 48

Route information
- Maintained by NCDOT
- Length: 53.4 mi (85.9 km)
- Existed: 1934–present

Major junctions
- South end: US 301 Bus. in Rocky Mount
- US 64 / NC 43 in Rocky Mount; US 301 in Rocky Mount; I-95 / NC 4 in Rocky Mount; US 158 in Roanoke Rapids
- North end: US 301 in Pleasant Hill

Location
- Country: United States
- State: North Carolina
- Counties: Nash, Halifax, Northampton

Highway system
- North Carolina Highway System; Interstate; US; State; Scenic
← NC 47	→ NC 49

North Carolina Highway 48 (NC 48) is a primary state highway in the U.S. state of North Carolina that principally connects the cities of Rocky Mount and Roanoke Rapids. The route offers an alternative to US 301 and I-95.

== Route description ==
The highway beings on Falls Road at northbound U.S. Route 301 Business in Rocky Mount. A block after passing by southbound US BUS 301 it enters the neighborhood named after the road. The overlap with NC 43 begins just south of an interchange with US 64 at Exit 468B, where the street becomes Benvenue Road entering the Golden East section of the city. This interchange includes an intersection with Hunter Hill Road. A few turns later, NC 43-48 has another interchange with US 301 Bypass. NC 48 leaves NC 43 at Goldrock Road, and leaves the Golden East section. This segment is primarily residential until it approaches the intersection with the Thomas A. Betts Parkway. From that point, it becomes more rural even as it runs through Drake, intersecting Red Oak-Battleboro Road (NC-1524).

The primarily rural setting is replaced by industrial zoning and then a series of motel franchises as the road approaches the intersection with NC 4 across from Exit 145 the trumpet interchange with Interstate 95. North of that intersection NC 48 is joined by an overlap with NC 4. North of there, surroundings become more rural again, with the exception of a concrete plant and a log home dealership. NC 4 and 48 pass over I-95 without access, switching from the east side of I-95 to the west. Beginning at the intersection with NC 33 in Hickory Crossroads, the route move further away from the interstate. Further north the routes approach a bridge that crosses the Fishing Creek, and thus the Nash-Halifax County Line. Continuing its rural surroundings NC 4 and 48 enters Glenview at the western terminus of NC 481, and later on Brinkleyville where NC 48 intersects with NC 561, and the overlap with NC 4 ends only to turn west onto highway 561, east of the Medoc Mountain State Park. North of Brinkleyville, the road winds through the forests and fields of rural Halifax County even through Aurelian Springs where it intersects Justice Branch Road (NC-1001), then after Fire Tower Road begins to curve to the northeast.

Along this trajectory, it passes through Gretna Green where it intersects NC 903. The road curves back towards the north again before entering a second urban setting known as the City of Roanoke Rapids and widens to four lanes becoming Roanoke Avenue as it approaches US 158. Despite being in a city, the surroundings are primarily suburban. Between the Julian R. Allsbrook Highway and East 14th Street, the road crosses a former Seaboard Air Line between two stations, and part of a wye leading to the WestRock Paper Mill. From there it becomes more urban until near First Street. The spur to that mill is crossed again at the Washington Street Extension just south of the Roanoke Canal Museum and Trail. Moving away from the west side of the mill, the route branches off onto Gaston Road to cross over the top of the Lake Gaston Dam at the Roanoke River as well as the Halifax-Northampton County Line, and instantly enters Gaston, where the route becomes Roanoke Rapids Road. At the intersection with NC 46, the name changes to Pleasant Hill Road and then curves to the east-northeast for the last time. East of the Gaston City Line, the surroundings become rural and stay that way for the rest of the rest of journey. Aside from Warner Bridge and Macon Price Roads (NC-1201), no other intersections exist besides dead end streets and private roads until the western terminus of NC 186 which continues north toward Moore's Ferry Road in Skippers, Virginia. The road crosses over I-95 again, but this time at Exit 180. In fact it serves as the last exit for I-95 in North Carolina. After passing by a small trucking company on the south side, it curves more towards the east, still remaining rural. North Carolina Highway 48 curves to the northeast as it ends at US 301 Pleasant Hill, just south of the North Carolina/Virginia border.

== History ==
The second and current NC 48 was established in 1934 as a renumbering of NC 482, which traversed between NC 43, in Rocky Mount, and US 158, in Littleton. In 1952, NC 48 was rerouted at Brinkleyville northeasterly on new primary routing to Roanoke Rapids, then replaced NC 47 through Gaston and Pleasant Hill; its former alignment became parts of NC 561, Old NC 48 (SR 1312) and NC 4. Between 1963-1968, NC 48 was extended south, with NC 43, to US 301 Business In 1998, NC 48, with NC 43, were rerouted on new connector on Peachtree Street.

=== North Carolina Highway 40A ===
North Carolina Highway 40A
- Location: Roanoke Rapids–Pleasant Hill
- Existed: 1932–1934

== Major intersections ==
County	Location	mi	km	Destinations	Notes
Nash	Rocky Mount	0.0	0.0	US 301 Bus. north (Church Street) / Falls Road	
Nash	Rocky Mount	0.1	0.16	US 301 Bus. south (Franklin Street)	One-way pair
Nash	Rocky Mount	0.2	0.32	NC 43 Bus. south (Grace Street)	Southern end of NC 43 Bus. concurrency; NC 48/NC 43 Bus. begins a one-way pair along Falls Road and Peachtree Street
Nash	Rocky Mount	1.2– 1.4	1.9– 2.3	US 64 / NC 43 south / NC 43 Bus. ends – Tarboro, Raleigh	Northern end of NC 43 Bus. concurrency; southern end of NC 43 concurrency
Nash	Rocky Mount	1.9– 2.1	3.1– 3.4	US 301 (Wesleyan Boulevard) – Weldon, Wilson	Interchange
Nash	Rocky Mount	2.6	4.2	NC 43 north (Benvenue Road) to I-95 – Red Oak	Northern end of NC 43 concurrency
Nash	Rocky Mount	8.7	14.0	I-95 / NC 4 south – Smithfield, Benson, Richmond	I-95 exit 145; southern end of NC 4 concurrency
Nash		13.7	22.0	NC 33 east to I-95 / Swift Creek School Road – Whitakers, Red Oak	Western terminus of NC 33
Halifax	Glenview	16.5	26.6	NC 481 east / Fishing Creek Road – Enfield	Western terminus of NC 481
Halifax	Brinkleyville	24.8	39.9	NC 4 north / NC 561 – Louisburg, Halifax	Northern end of NC 4 concurrency
Halifax	Gretna Green	36.3	58.4	NC 903 – Littleton, Halifax	
Halifax	Roanoke Rapids	42.3	68.1	US 158 (Littleton Road) – Littleton, Weldon	
Halifax	Roanoke Rapids	43.4	69.8	NC 125 south (10th Street)	Northern terminus of NC 125
Northampton	Gaston	46.7	75.2	NC 46 (Lawrenceville Road) to I-95 – Garysburg, Lawrenceville, Lake Gaston	
Northampton		49.8	80.1	NC 186 east (James Jones Road)	Western terminus of NC 186
Northampton		50.3– 50.5	81.0– 81.3	I-95 – Rocky Mount, Emporia	I-95 exit 180
Northampton	Pleasant Hill	53.4	85.9	US 301 – Weldon, Emporia	
1.000 mi = 1.609 km; 1.000 km = 0.621 mi: Concurrency terminus

== See also ==
- North Carolina Bicycle Route 4-Concurrent with NC 48 from Gaston to Macon Price Road in Northampton County
