= North Carolina Highway 43 =

State highway in North Carolina, US

North Carolina Highway 43

- Route of NC 43 highlighted in red

Route information
- Maintained by NCDOT
- Length: 119.6 mi (192.5 km)
- Existed: 1928–present

Major junctions
- South end: US 17 / US 70 near New Bern
- US 17 near Vanceboro; US 13 in Greenville; US 264 in Greenville; US 64 in Rocky Mount; US 301 in Rocky Mount; I-95 in Dortches
- North end: NC 58 near Warrenton

Location
- Country: United States
- State: North Carolina
- Counties: Craven, Pitt, Edgecombe, Nash, Halifax, Warren

Highway system
- North Carolina Highway System; Interstate; US; State; Scenic
← NC 42	→ NC 45

North Carolina Highway 43 (NC 43) is a primary state highway in the U.S. state of North Carolina. It connects many towns in the Coastal Plain region.

== History ==
NC 43 was established around 1928 as a new primary routing between US 17-1/NC 40, in Rocky Mount, and NC 58, in Liberia. In 1931, NC 43 was extended southeast on new primary routing, through Pinetops, to Greenville; then replaced NC 301 to US 17/NC 30, in Vanceboro. Around 1936, NC 43 was rerouted onto new roadway at Essex, avoiding Hollister. In 1958, NC 43 was rerouted in the downtown Greenville area, leaving behind: Charles Avenue, 10th Street, Albemarle Street and 5th Street.

In 1987, NC 43 was extended south of Vanceboro along US 17 Business and US 17 to Weyerhaeuser Road. Traveling along Weyerhaeuser Road, it connects and overlap with NC 55 going into New Bern; then with US 70 Business and southward to US 70 and US 17. The resulting new routing made a western rural bypass of New Bern. In 1998, NC 43 was rerouted onto new connector in downtown Rocky Mount. In 2001, NC 43 was rerouted onto northern bypass route around Rocky Mount, leaving behind NC 43 Bus. In 2009, NC 43 was rerouted onto new road between NC 55 and US 17/US 70, eliminating its routing through New Bern.

=== Future ===
NCDOT currently plans to extend NC 43 from its current southern terminus at US 17/US 70 southward to US 17 Business outside of New Bern. Part of the right-of-way south of the current NC 43 terminus has already been built; the southern part of right-of-way will be on Trent Creek Road. Construction is set to begin in 2025.

== Major intersections ==
County	Location	mi	km	Exit	Destinations	Notes
Craven	New Bern	0.0– 0.3	0.0– 0.48		US 17 / US 70 – Morehead City, Kinston, Jacksonville	Exit 411 (US 70)
Craven	New Bern	2.1	3.4		NC 55 (Neuse Boulevard) – Kinston	
Craven		10.8	17.4		US 17 south / Macedonia Church Road – New Bern	Southern end of US 17 concurrency
Craven		14.3	23.0		US 17 north / US 17 Bus. begins – Washington	Northern end of US 17 concurrency; Southern end of US 17 Bus. Concurrency
Craven	Vanceboro	16.4	26.4		US 17 Bus. north (Main Street) – Washington	Northern end of US 17 Bus. Concurrency
Craven	Vanceboro	16.9	27.2		NC 118 west / Bailey Lane – Grifton	Eastern terminus of NC 118
Pitt	Calico	26.1	42.0		NC 102 – Ayden, Edward R. Murrow Transmitting Station	
Pitt	Greenville	40.3	64.9		US 264 Alt. east (Greenville Boulevard) / Charles Boulevard – Washington	Southern end of US 264 Alt. concurrency
Pitt	Greenville	42.6	68.6		US 264 Alt. west (Greenville Boulevard) / NC 11 south / NC 903 south (Memorial Drive) – Farmville, Wilson, Kinston	Northern end of US 264 Alt. concurrency; Southern end of NC 11/NC; 903 concurrency
Pitt	Greenville	44.5	71.6		US 13 south (Dickinson Avenue) – Farmville	Southern end of US 13 concurrency
Pitt	Greenville	45.5	73.2		US 13 north / NC 11 north / NC 903 north (Memorial Drive) / 5th Street – Bethel	Northern end of US 13/NC 11/NC 903 concurrencies
Pitt		48.0– 48.2	77.2– 77.6		US 264 / NC 11 Byp. – Washington, Wilson	Exit 75 (US 264)
Pitt	Bruce	52.4	84.3		NC 121 south – Farmville	Northern terminus of NC 121
Pitt		54.0	86.9		NC 222 east – [[, North Carolina|]]	Southern end of NC 222 concurrency
Pitt	Falkland	54.9	88.4		NC 222 west (West Avenue) / Crisp Street – Fountain	Northern end of NC 222 concurrency
Edgecombe		61.9	99.6		NC 42 north – Conetoe	Western end of NC 42 concurrency
Edgecombe		62.0	99.8		NC 124 west – Macclesfield	Eastern terminus of NC 124
Edgecombe		63.2	101.7		US 258 – Tarboro, Princeville, Kinston	
Edgecombe	Pinetops	65.1	104.8		NC 122 (2nd Street)	
Edgecombe	Pinetops	65.3	105.1		NC 42 south (Halmet Street) / 3rd Street	Northern end of NC 42 concurrency
Edgecombe		66.9	107.7		NC 111	
Edgecombe		78.0	125.5		NC 43 Bus. north – [[, North Carolina|]]	Southern terminus of NC 43 Bus.
Edgecombe	Rocky Mount	80.1	128.9		US 64 Alt. east / Springfield Road	Southern end of US 64 Alt. concurrency
Edgecombe	Rocky Mount	80.4– 80.7	129.4– 129.9	472	US 64 east / US 64 Alt. ends / US 64 Bus. west (Raleigh Boulevard) – Tarboro	Northern end of US 64 Alt. concurrency; Southern end of US 64 concurrency; Eastern terminus of US 64 Bus.
Edgecombe	Rocky Mount	82.2– 82.4	132.3– 132.6	470	NC 97 (Atlantic Avenue) – [[, North Carolina|]], [[, North Carolina|]]	
Nash	Rocky Mount	82.8– 83.0	133.3– 133.6	469	US 301 Bus. (Church Street)	
Nash	Rocky Mount	83.4– 83.6	134.2– 134.5	468B	NC 48 south / NC 43 Bus. south (Peachtree Street/Fall Road) – Raleigh	Northern end of US 64 concurrency; Southern end of NC 48 concurrency; Northern terminus of NC 43 Bus.
Nash	Rocky Mount	84.1– 84.3	135.3– 135.7		US 301 (Wesleyan Boulevard) – Weldon, Wilson	Interchange
Nash	Rocky Mount	84.8	136.5		NC 48 north (Goldrock Road)	Northern end of NC 48 concurrency
Nash	Dortches	88.5– 88.7	142.4– 142.7		I-95 – Roanoke Rapids, Wilson	Exit 141 (I-95)
Halifax		106.0	170.6		NC 561 west – Louisburg	Southern end of NC 561 concurrency
Halifax	Essex	108.0	173.8		NC 561 east / Evans Road/Lynch Road – Halifax	Northern end of NC 561 concurrency
Warren	Liberia	119.6	192.5		NC 58 – Warrenton, Centerville	
1.000 mi = 1.609 km; 1.000 km = 0.621 mi: Concurrency terminus

== Special routes ==
=== Rocky Mount business loop ===
North Carolina Highway 43 Business
- Location: Rocky Mount, North Carolina
- Length: 5.0 mi (8.0 km)
- Existed: 2001–present

North Carolina Highway 43 Business (NC 43 Bus) was established in 2001, when NC 43 was rerouted to bypass north of downtown Rocky Mount. The business loop travels along Cokey Road, Fairview Road, Grand Avenue, Grace Street and Falls Road.

Major intersections

County	Location	mi	km	Destinations	Notes
Edgecombe		0.0	0.0	NC 43 (Springfield Road/Cokey Road) – Pinetops, Greenville	
Edgecombe	Rocky Mount	2.7	4.3	US 64 Bus. (Raleigh Boulevard)	
Edgecombe	Rocky Mount	3.5	5.6	NC 97 (Atlantic Avenue)	
Nash	Rocky Mount	3.8	6.1	US 301 Bus. (Church Street)	
Nash	Rocky Mount	3.9	6.3	NC 48 south (Falls Road/Grace Street)	Southern end of NC 48 concurrency (one way pair)
Nash	Rocky Mount	5.0	8.0	US 64 / NC 43 / NC 48 north (Benvenue Road) – Tarboro, Raleigh	Exit 468B (US 64); Northern end of NC 48 concurrency
1.000 mi = 1.609 km; 1.000 km = 0.621 mi: Concurrency terminus

== In popular culture ==
North Carolina Highway 43 (NC 43) is used by people travelling to and from Mayberry on The Andy Griffith Show. Notable episodes that reference NC 43 are "Andy's English Valet", "Man In a Hurry" and "Gomer Saves the Day".
