= NC4 =

NC4, NC-4 or similar may refer to:

- Curtiss NC-4, an aircraft
- North Carolina Highway 4, a state highway in eastern North Carolina
- Charlotte Route 4, a local road in Charlotte, North Carolina
- North Carolina's 4th congressional district
