= North Carolina Highway 481 =

State highway in Halifax County, North Carolina, US

North Carolina Highway 481

Route information
- Maintained by NCDOT
- Length: 21.0 mi (33.8 km)
- Existed: 1937–present

Major junctions
- West end: NC 4 / NC 48 in Glenview
- I-95 near Glenview; US 301 near Enfield
- East end: NC 561 in Tillery

Location
- Country: United States
- State: North Carolina
- Counties: Halifax

Highway system
- North Carolina Highway System; Interstate; US; State; Scenic
← NC 461	→ I-485

North Carolina Highway 481 (NC 481) is a 21-mile (34 km) primary state highway in the U.S. state of North Carolina, connecting Enfield to nearby Interstate 95 (I-95) and the surrounding farmlands of southern Halifax County.

== Description ==
NC 481 is a two-lane rural highway that serves primarily as a farm-to-market route rather than as one to destinations other than Enfield. It begins at an intersection with NC 4/NC 48 in the community of Glenview, then proceeds east, quickly connecting with I-95 along the way. Near Enfield, NC 481 Business goes straight into the downtown area, while NC 481 meets U.S. Route 301 (US 301) before entering the town. After passing through town, it splits with US 301 north of Enfield and continues northeasterly. After connecting with NC 125/NC 903, it ends at NC 561 in the community of Tillery, near the banks of the Roanoke River.

== History ==
NC 481 made three brief appearances before the routing that exists today. The first NC 481 appeared in 1925 as a new primary routing from NC 48 in Roanoke Rapids, to NC 40 in Pleasant Hill. In 1926, NC 40 was rerouted and replaced all of the first NC 481, quickly lead to the second establishment of NC 481 to replace an old alignment of NC 40 from Garysburg to Pleasant Hill. In 1930, NC 40 and NC 481 switched routes again, ending the second and the start of the third, from NC 48 in Roanoke Rapids, to NC 40 in Pleasant Hill. In 1932, the third NC 481 was renumbered NC 40A.

The fourth and current NC 48 was established in 1937 as a new primary routing from NC 48 in Glenview to NC 561 in Tillery. In 2007, NC 481 was rerouted south of Enfield to US 301 before traveling back through town; the old alignment became NC 481 Business.

== Junction list ==
The entire route is in Halifax County.

Location	mi	km	Destinations	Notes
Glenview	0.0	0.0	NC 4 / NC 48 – Rocky Mount, Roanoke Rapids	Western terminus
	2.6	4.2	I-95 – Rocky Mount, Roanoke Rapids	Exit 154 (I-95)
	6.9	11.1	NC 481 Bus. east – Enfield	
	8.0	12.9	US 301 south – Rocky Mount	South end of US 301 overlap
Enfield	9.3	15.0	NC 481 Bus. west (Whitaker Street)	
	11.1	17.9	US 301 north – Halifax	North end of US 301 overlap
	16.3	26.2	NC 125 / NC 903 – Scotland Neck, Halifax	
Tillery	21.0	33.8	NC 561 – Rich Square, Halifax	Eastern terminus
1.000 mi = 1.609 km; 1.000 km = 0.621 mi: Concurrency terminus

== Special routes ==
=== Enfield business loop ===
North Carolina Highway 481 Business
- Location: Enfield, North Carolina
- Length: 1.7 mi (2.7 km)
- Existed: 2007–present

North Carolina Highway 481 Business (NC 481 Bus) was established in 2007, when NC 481 was rerouted onto new bypass south onto US 301. The business loop travels along Glenview Road, Whitfield Street and Whitaker Street.
