= Nash County, North Carolina =

County in North Carolina, United States

- County
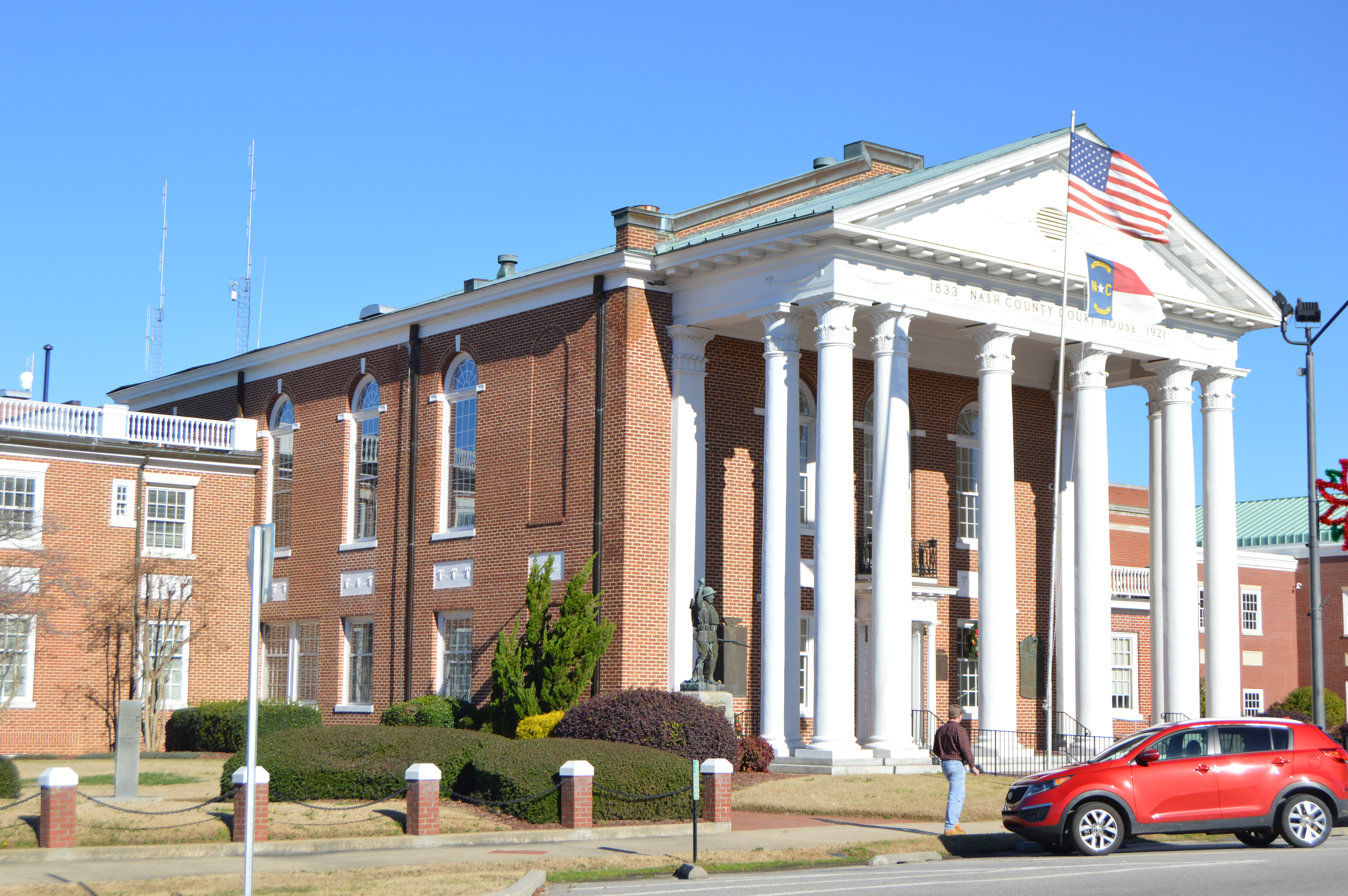
- Nash County Courthouse in Nashville

- Flag Seal Logo
- Motto: "Where Business meets Opportunity"
- Location within the U.S. state of North Carolina
- Coordinates: 35.97°N 77.99°W
- Country: United States
- State: North Carolina
- Founded: 1777
- Named for: Francis Nash
- Seat: Nashville
- Largest community: Rocky Mount

Area
  - Total: 542.82 sq mi (1,405.9 km^{2})
  - Land: 540.44 sq mi (1,399.7 km^{2})
  - Water: 2.38 sq mi (6.2 km^{2}) 0.44%

Population (2020)
  - Total: 94,970
  - Estimate (2025): 99,365 ▲
  - Density: 175.73/sq mi (67.85/km^{2})
- Time zone: UTC−5 (Eastern)
  - Summer (DST): UTC−4 (EDT)
- Congressional district: 1st
- Website: nashcountync.gov

Nash County is a county located in the U.S. state of North Carolina. As of the 2020 census, its population was 94,970. Its county seat is Nashville. Nash County is part of the Rocky Mount, NC metropolitan statistical area.

== History ==
The area eventually comprising Nash County was originally organized as a part of Edgecombe County. Settlement first occurred in the 1740s; the earliest land grants date to 1743. As the population of Edgecombe increased, citizens in the western portion of the county found travel to the county seat of Tarboro to conduct official business to be difficult. Legislator Nathan Boddie proposed to the North Carolina Provincial Congress that the county be divided. As a result, Nash was formed from all parts of Edgecombe west of the Falls of the Tar River in 1777. It was named for American Revolutionary War Brigadier General Francis Nash, who was mortally wounded at the Battle of Germantown. The first session of the county court met on April 1, 1778, in the home of Micajah Thomas. Court was then held in a temporary building at Peach Tree until a permanent courthouse was erected in Nashville in 1784. Nashville was formally designated the seat of county government in 1815 and was incorporated in 1823. In 1833, the county's first courthouse burned down and was replaced by a brick building.

In 1786, the state of North Carolina conducted a census that recorded a total population of 5,277 in Nash County. The first U.S. Census in 1790 recorded a total population of 7,393, of whom 2,099 were slaves, 183 were free blacks, and the rest whites. Several early communities in Nash County developed as stops along stagecoach routes, including Dortches, Red Oak, Stanhope, Hilliardston, and Castalia. Settlement also occurred along rivers and creeks, accompanied by the construction of gristmills. In the 1830s, the Wilmington and Weldon Railroad was laid, leading to further settlement. The building of a spur line in 1840 led to the eventual creation of the community of Whitakers. By the 1860s, Nash County had a population over 11,600 and an economy centered on agriculture. In 1855, parts of Nash, Edgecombe, Johnston, and Wayne Counties were combined to form Wilson County. Over 1,000 men from the county fought in the American Civil War.

In 1871, after significant political controversy, all parts of Edgecombe County west of the Wilmington and Weldon Railroad were annexed to Nash leading to the bifurcation of the Edgecombe communities of Battleboro and Sharpsburg between the two counties. As a result of the boundary shift, Nash County's black population grew and a greater portion of the town of Rocky Mount also lay within Nash County's border, including Rocky Mount Mills, the second textile mill to exist in the state. In 1899, the Atlantic Coast Line Railroad established repair shops in Rocky Mount, precipitating the city's rapid growth. In 1921, the county's third courthouse was built.

== Geography ==
Interactive map of Nash County

Nash County rests in the northeastern part of North Carolina along the dividing line between the Piedmont and Coastal Plain regions. According to the U.S. Census Bureau, the county has a total area of 542.82 square miles (1,405.9 km^{2}), of which 2.38 square miles (6.2 km^{2}) (0.44%) atr covered by water. Elevation in the county gradually rises from the east to the west.

=== State and local protected areas ===
- Flower Hill Nature Preserve (part)
- Sandy Creek Game Land (part)
- Shocco Creek Game Land (part)

=== Major water bodies ===
- Fishing Creek
- Moccasin Creek
- Pig Basket Creek
- Sapony Creek
- Stoney Creek
- Swift Creek
- Tar River
- Toisnot Swamp
- Turkey Creek

=== Adjacent counties ===
- Franklin County
- Johnston County
- Wilson County
- Edgecombe County
- Halifax County

=== Major highways ===
- Future I-87
- I-95
- Future I-587
- US 64
- US 64 Alt.
- US 64 Bus. (Nashville)
- US 64 Bus. (Rocky Mount)
- US 264
- US 264 Alt.
- US 301
- US 301 Bus.
- NC 4
- NC 33
- NC 43
- NC 43 Bus.
- NC 48
- NC 56
- NC 58
- NC 97
- NC 98
- NC 231
- NC 561
- NC 581

=== Major infrastructure ===
- Rocky Mount-Wilson Regional Airport

== Demographics ==
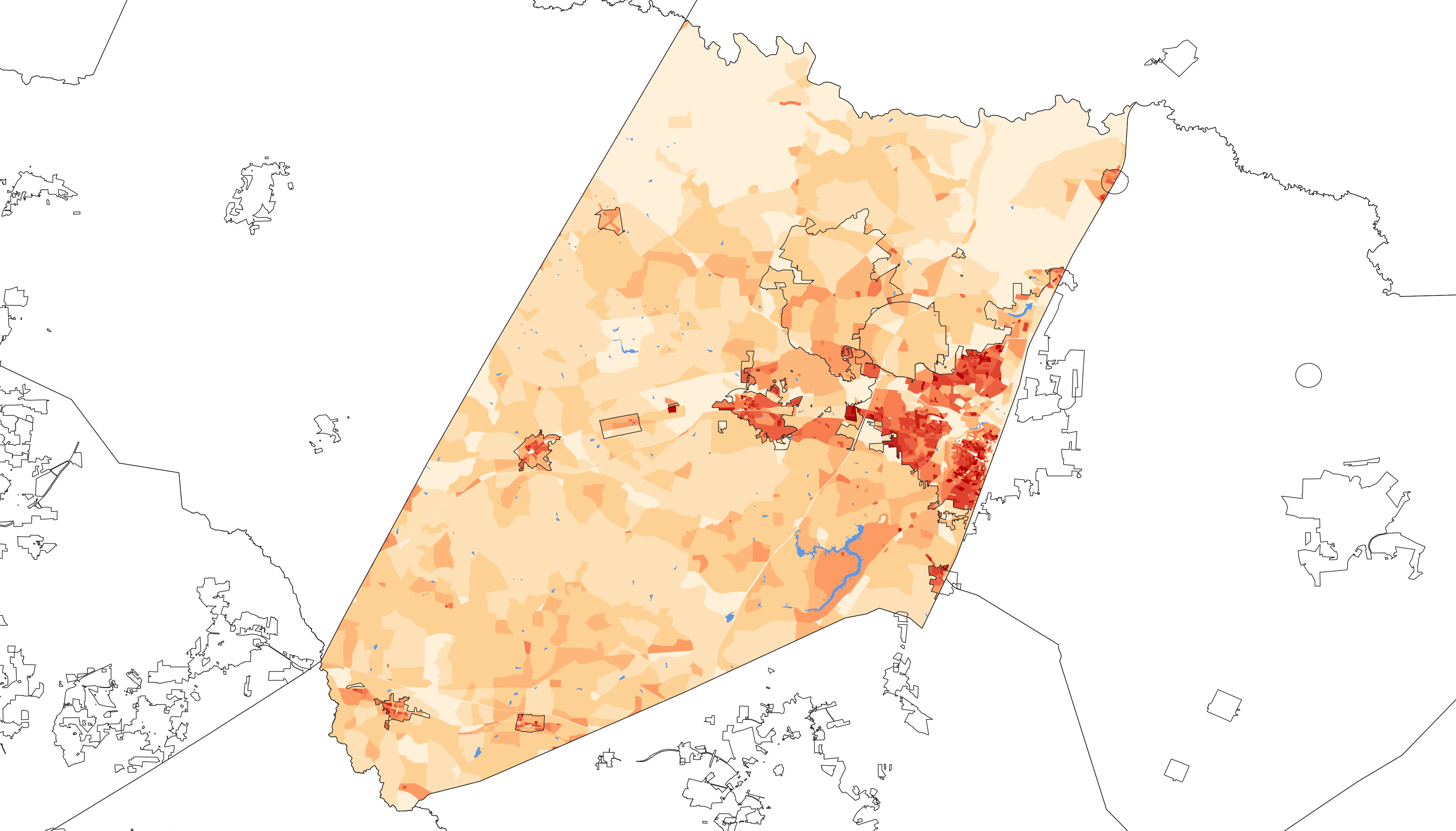
2020 population density of Nash County NC by census block

=== Racial and ethnic composition ===
Nash County, North Carolina – Racial and ethnic composition Note: the US Census treats Hispanic/Latino as an ethnic category. This table excludes Latinos from the racial categories and assigns them to a separate category. Hispanics/Latinos may be of any race.
| Race / Ethnicity (NH = Non-Hispanic) | Pop 1980 | Pop 1990 | Pop 2000 | Pop 2010 | Pop 2020 | % 1980 | % 1990 | % 2000 | % 2010 | % 2020 |
|---|---|---|---|---|---|---|---|---|---|---|
| White alone (NH) | 44,549 | 51,563 | 53,326 | 51,770 | 46,317 | 66.34% | 67.25% | 61.00% | 54.02% | 48.77% |
| Black or African American alone (NH) | 21,772 | 24,067 | 29,505 | 35,449 | 36,679 | 32.42% | 31.39% | 33.75% | 36.99% | 38.62% |
| Native American or Alaska Native alone (NH) | 85 | 209 | 346 | 567 | 615 | 0.13% | 0.27% | 0.40% | 0.59% | 0.65% |
| Asian alone (NH) | 149 | 221 | 477 | 713 | 904 | 0.22% | 0.29% | 0.55% | 0.74% | 0.95% |
| Native Hawaiian or Pacific Islander alone (NH) | x | x | 20 | 17 | 28 | x | x | 0.02% | 0.02% | 0.03% |
| Other race alone (NH) | 11 | 11 | 80 | 112 | 407 | 0.02% | 0.01% | 0.09% | 0.12% | 0.43% |
| Mixed race or Multiracial (NH) | x | x | 727 | 1,197 | 2,698 | x | x | 0.83% | 1.25% | 2.84% |
| Hispanic or Latino (any race) | 587 | 606 | 2,939 | 6,015 | 7,322 | 0.87% | 0.79% | 3.36% | 6.28% | 7.71% |
| Total | 67,153 | 76,677 | 87,420 | 95,840 | 94,970 | 100.00% | 100.00% | 100.00% | 100.00% | 100.00% |

=== 2020 census ===
As of the 2020 census, 94,970 people, 39,093 households, and 27,002 families were residing in the county.

The median age was 43.1 years; 21.5% of residents were under 18 and 19.7% were 65 or older. For every 100 females, there were 90.7 males, and for every 100 females 18 and over, there were 87.8 males age 18 and over.

The racial makeup of the county was 49.9% White, 38.9% Black or African American, 0.8% American Indian and Alaska Native, 1.0% Asian, <0.1% Native Hawaiian and Pacific Islander, 4.9% from some other race, and 4.5% from two or more races. Hispanic or Latino residents of any race comprised 7.7% of the population.

About 50.3% of residents lived in urban areas, while 49.7% lived in rural areas.

Of the households, 28.6% had children under 18 living in them, 42.0% were married-couple households, 18.3% were households with a male householder and no spouse or partner present, and 33.9% were households with a female householder and no spouse or partner present. About 30.6% of all households were made up of individuals, and 13.9% had someone living alone who was 65 years of age or older.

Of the 43,154 housing units, 9.4% were vacant. Among occupied housing units, 63.9% were owner-occupied and 36.1% were renter-occupied. The homeowner vacancy rate was 1.2% and the rental vacancy rate was 6.6%.

=== Demographic change ===
Historical population

Historical population
| Census | Pop. | Note | %± |
|---|---|---|---|
| 1790 | 7,390 | | — |
| 1800 | 6,975 | | −5.6% |
| 1810 | 7,268 | | 4.2% |
| 1820 | 8,185 | | 12.6% |
| 1830 | 8,490 | | 3.7% |
| 1840 | 9,047 | | 6.6% |
| 1850 | 10,657 | | 17.8% |
| 1860 | 11,687 | | 9.7% |
| 1870 | 11,077 | | −5.2% |
| 1880 | 17,731 | | 60.1% |
| 1890 | 20,707 | | 16.8% |
| 1900 | 25,478 | | 23.0% |
| 1910 | 33,727 | | 32.4% |
| 1920 | 41,061 | | 21.7% |
| 1930 | 52,782 | | 28.5% |
| 1940 | 55,608 | | 5.4% |
| 1950 | 59,919 | | 7.8% |
| 1960 | 61,002 | | 1.8% |
| 1970 | 59,122 | | −3.1% |
| 1980 | 67,153 | | 13.6% |
| 1990 | 76,677 | | 14.2% |
| 2000 | 87,420 | | 14.0% |
| 2010 | 95,840 | | 9.6% |
| 2020 | 94,970 | | −0.9% |
| 2025 (est.) | 99,365 | ▲ | 4.6% |
U.S. Decennial Census; 1790–1960 1900–1990; 1990–2000 2010 2020

After decades of growth, Nash County recorded an almost 1% population loss between 2010 and 2020.

== Government and politics ==
=== Government ===
Nash County is run by a commission–manager government. Legislative and policy-making power is vested in a seven-member board of commissioners, who are elected in districts to serve four-year staggered terms. The board passes ordinances, adopts the county budget, and appoints the county manager. The manager wields executive authority over county administration, appoints directors of county government departments, and implements the commission's decisions. County government provides various services, including public safety, social services, cultural activities, and the provision of utilities.

Nash County is represented in the General Assembly by the Senate's 11th district and the House of Representatives' 24th and 25th districts. It lies within the bounds of North Carolina's 8th Prosecutorial District, the 8A Superior Court District, and the 8th District Court District.

Nash County is a member of the regional Upper Coastal Plain Council of Governments.

=== Politics ===
From the turn of the 20th century, North Carolina established barriers that effectively disenfranchised the large black population, which had been supporting Republican candidates. Conservative whites voted overwhelmingly Democratic and the county and state were part of the resulting political "Solid South" county. Although it gave a plurality to Populist candidate James B. Weaver in 1892, unlike Sampson County or Alabama's Chilton County, it did not subsequently turn to the Republican Party.

Nash County voted Democratic in every election from 1896 to 1964 – in Franklin D. Roosevelt and Harry S. Truman's five elections, the Republicans never received eleven percent of the county's limited electorate's ballots. Many whites supported George Wallace's American Independent candidacy in 1968, after passage of the Voting Rights Act. More voted Republican for the first time in 1972.

While Nash voters supported favorite son and Southern Democrat Jimmy Carter in 1976, the county's majority-white voters shifted to Republican candidates from 1980 to 2004. But the last four elections have been closely contested. The margin of victory has been less than 1,000 votes in every election since. Nash County has emerged in recent years as a swing county and a bellwether county. As of 2024, it is the only North Carolina county to support the winning U.S. presidential election candidate four times in a row, supporting Barack Obama in 2012, Donald Trump in 2016, Joe Biden in 2020, and Trump in 2024. In 2024, it also split its majority vote between Republican and Democratic statewide candidates.

United States presidential election results for Nash County, North Carolina
| Year | Republican | | Democratic | | Third party(ies) | |
| Year | No. | % | No. | % | No. | % |
|---|---|---|---|---|---|---|
| 1880 | 1,406 | 46.59% | 1,612 | 53.41% | 0 | 0.00% |
| 1884 | 1,556 | 45.75% | 1,845 | 54.25% | 0 | 0.00% |
| 1888 | 1,719 | 44.08% | 2,181 | 55.92% | 0 | 0.00% |
| 1892 | 476 | 16.96% | 997 | 35.53% | 1,333 | 47.51% |
| 1896 | 1,699 | 36.81% | 2,916 | 63.17% | 1 | 0.02% |
| 1900 | 1,337 | 33.96% | 2,600 | 66.04% | 0 | 0.00% |
| 1904 | 645 | 31.02% | 1,428 | 68.69% | 6 | 0.29% |
| 1908 | 1,334 | 44.29% | 1,678 | 55.71% | 0 | 0.00% |
| 1912 | 172 | 6.49% | 1,862 | 70.21% | 618 | 23.30% |
| 1916 | 826 | 27.22% | 2,189 | 72.15% | 19 | 0.63% |
| 1920 | 1,556 | 27.85% | 4,031 | 72.15% | 0 | 0.00% |
| 1924 | 823 | 20.16% | 3,129 | 76.63% | 131 | 3.21% |
| 1928 | 2,066 | 32.72% | 4,249 | 67.28% | 0 | 0.00% |
| 1932 | 532 | 6.61% | 7,472 | 92.79% | 49 | 0.61% |
| 1936 | 517 | 5.62% | 8,682 | 94.38% | 0 | 0.00% |
| 1940 | 613 | 6.76% | 8,456 | 93.24% | 0 | 0.00% |
| 1944 | 876 | 10.36% | 7,577 | 89.64% | 0 | 0.00% |
| 1948 | 684 | 7.98% | 7,590 | 88.50% | 302 | 3.52% |
| 1952 | 2,636 | 20.18% | 10,424 | 79.82% | 0 | 0.00% |
| 1956 | 2,665 | 21.09% | 9,969 | 78.91% | 0 | 0.00% |
| 1960 | 3,896 | 27.86% | 10,086 | 72.14% | 0 | 0.00% |
| 1964 | 6,396 | 41.11% | 9,163 | 58.89% | 0 | 0.00% |
| 1968 | 4,602 | 24.08% | 5,283 | 27.64% | 9,230 | 48.29% |
| 1972 | 12,679 | 71.39% | 4,503 | 25.35% | 579 | 3.26% |
| 1976 | 8,477 | 48.12% | 8,937 | 50.73% | 202 | 1.15% |
| 1980 | 11,043 | 56.34% | 8,184 | 41.75% | 374 | 1.91% |
| 1984 | 17,295 | 66.73% | 8,588 | 33.14% | 34 | 0.13% |
| 1988 | 15,906 | 64.34% | 8,740 | 35.35% | 76 | 0.31% |
| 1992 | 14,446 | 48.34% | 10,809 | 36.17% | 4,631 | 15.50% |
| 1996 | 15,309 | 54.17% | 11,142 | 39.42% | 1,811 | 6.41% |
| 2000 | 17,995 | 58.97% | 12,376 | 40.56% | 142 | 0.47% |
| 2004 | 21,902 | 58.14% | 15,693 | 41.66% | 78 | 0.21% |
| 2008 | 23,728 | 50.36% | 23,099 | 49.02% | 291 | 0.62% |
| 2012 | 23,842 | 49.17% | 24,313 | 50.14% | 337 | 0.69% |
| 2016 | 23,319 | 48.92% | 23,235 | 48.75% | 1,111 | 2.33% |
| 2020 | 25,827 | 49.41% | 25,947 | 49.64% | 497 | 0.95% |
| 2024 | 26,431 | 50.37% | 25,508 | 48.61% | 532 | 1.01% |

=== Sheriff ===
The Sheriff's Office provides police services for the unincorporated areas of the county.

== Economy ==
As of 2023, the biggest sectors in Nash County's economy were manufacturing, healthcare and social services, retail, food and accommodation services, and education. The largest private employer is Hospira, which operates a vaccine-manufacturing facility in Rocky Mount.

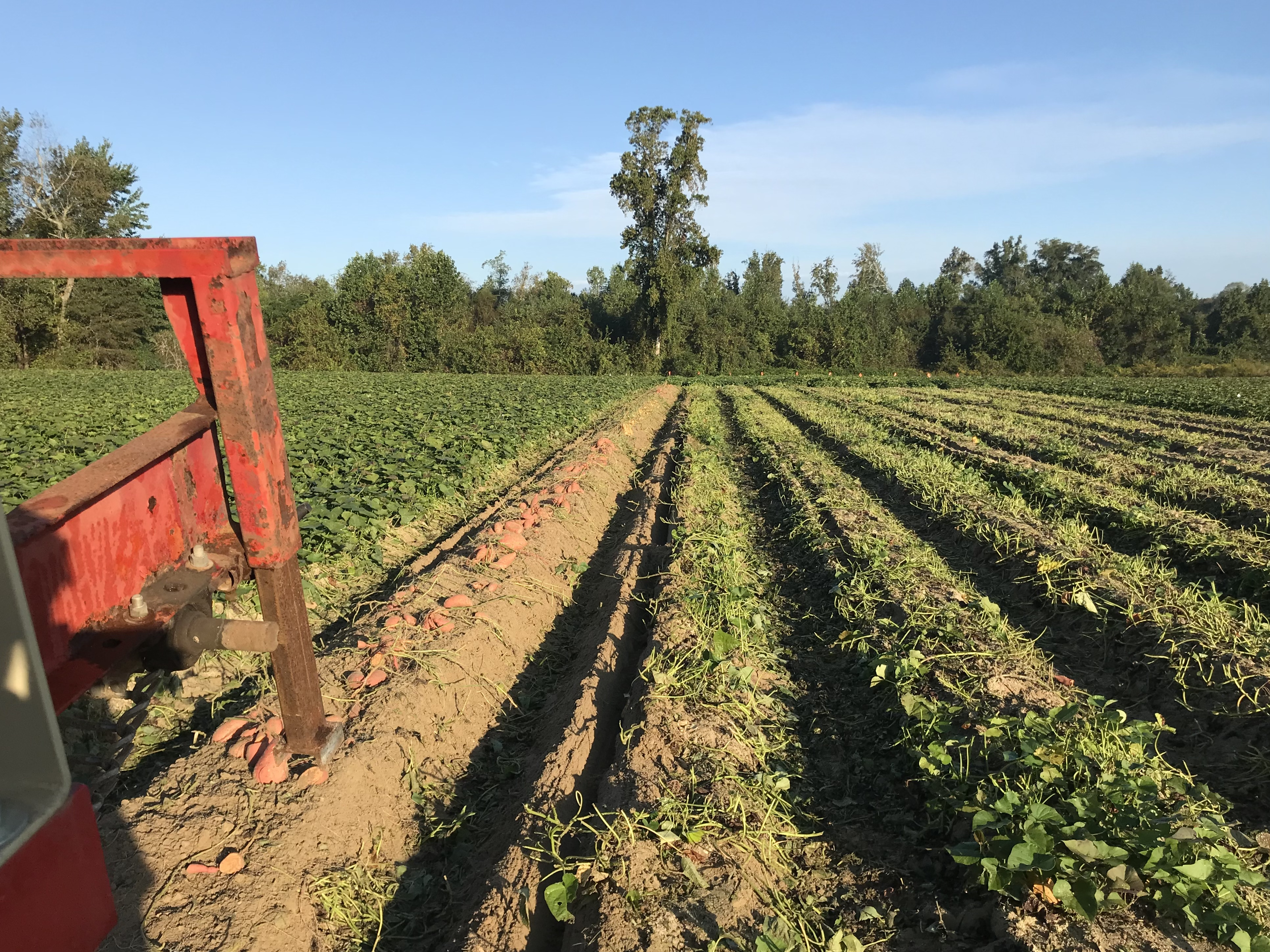
Sweet potato harvest in Nash County

As of 2023, over 40% of the county's area is cultivated farmland. Its top agricultural products are poultry, eggs, tobacco, and sweet potatoes. Nash is one of the top sweet potato-producing counties in the state.

== Education ==
Nash County Public Schools has 25 schools, including Nash Central High School, Northern Nash High School, Rocky Mount High School, and Southern Nash High School.

== Communities ==
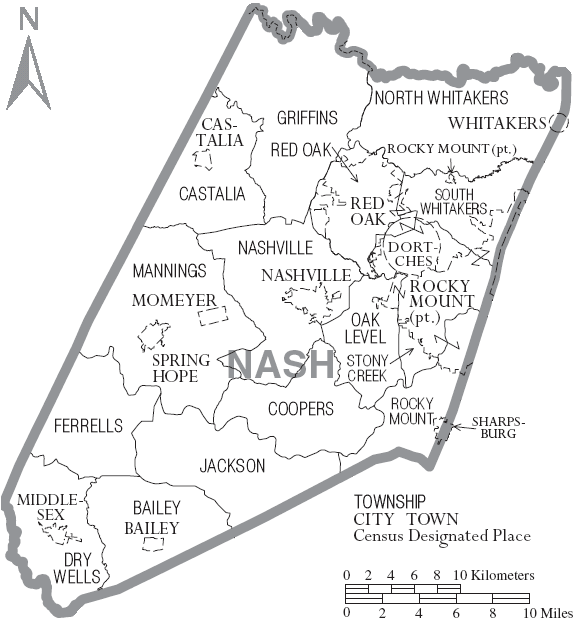
Map of Nash County with municipal and township labels

=== Cities ===
- Rocky Mount (largest community; parts located in Edgecombe County)

=== Towns ===
- Bailey
- Castalia
- Dortches
- Elm City (part)
- Middlesex
- Momeyer
- Nashville (county seat)
- Red Oak
- Spring Hope
- Sharpsburg (part)
- Whitakers (part)
- Zebulon (part)

=== Townships ===
- Bailey
- Castalia
- Coopers
- Dry Wells
- Ferrells
- Griffins
- Jackson
- Mannings
- Nashville
- North Whitakers
- Oak Level
- Red Oak
- Rocky Mount
- South Whitakers
- Spring Hope
- Stony Creek

=== Unincorporated community ===
- Corinth

== See also ==
- List of counties in North Carolina
- National Register of Historic Places listings in Nash County, North Carolina
- Haliwa-Saponi, state-recognized tribe that resides in the county
- Nash Community College, located near Nashville
