= North Carolina Highway 461 =

State highway in Hertford County, North Carolina, US

North Carolina Highway 461

Route information
- Maintained by NCDOT
- Length: 19.1 mi (30.7 km)
- Existed: 1964–present

Major junctions
- West end: NC 561 in Saint John
- US 13 near Winton
- East end: Nucor Steel near Cofield

Location
- Country: United States
- State: North Carolina
- Counties: Hertford

Highway system
- North Carolina Highway System; Interstate; US; State; Scenic
← US 441	→ NC 481

North Carolina Highway 461 (NC 461) is a primary state highway in the U.S. state of North Carolina. Its western terminus is at NC 561, passes through Winton and Cofield, and has its eastern end at an entrance to a Nucor steel plant east of Cofield.

== Route description ==
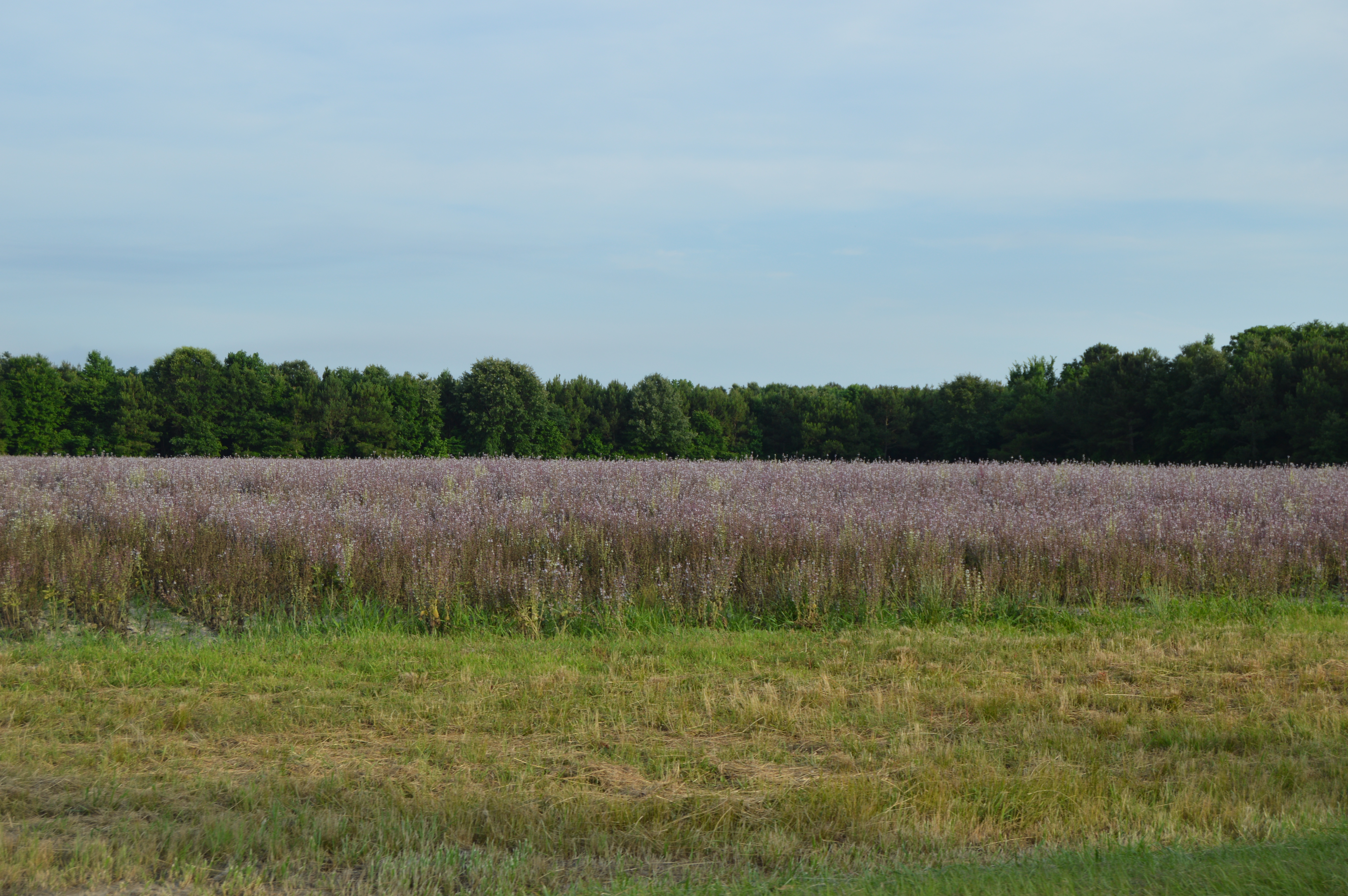
Agricultural scene west of Cofield

NC 461 is a two-lane rural highway that begins at NC 561 in Saint John, and travels northeast, crossing NC 11 and having a concurrency with U.S. Route 13 (US 13). Following its split from US 13, it travels to NC 45 in Winton. From Winton, and in concurrency with NC 45, it travels through Cofield, then splits just east of the village. It continues north on Farmers Chemical Road, then east on River Road, ending at the entrance of Nucor Plate Mill, Hertford.

== History ==
NC 461 was established in 1964 as a new primary routing from NC 561 in Saint John to US 13 south of Winton. In 1999, NC 461 was extended east, with a short concurrency with US 13 it splits near Winton, where it follows along Old Highway 13 to NC 45, then in concurrency until Farmers Chemical Road, where it continues as a new primary spur to the steel plant.

== Junction list ==
The entire route is in Hertford County.

Location	mi	km	Destinations	Notes
Saint John	0.0	0.0	NC 561 – Ahoskie, Rich Square	
	5.8	9.3	NC 11 – Ahoskie, Murfreesboro	
	8.2	13.2	US 13 – Ahoskie	South end of US 13 overlap
	8.9	14.3	US 13 – Suffolk	North end of US 13 overlap
Winton	10.4	16.7	NC 45 north (Main Street)	North end of NC 45 overlap
	15.0	24.1	NC 45 south – Plymouth	South end of NC 45 overlap
	19.1	30.7	Nucor Plate Mill, Hertford entrance	
1.000 mi = 1.609 km; 1.000 km = 0.621 mi: Concurrency terminus
