= Corinth, Nash County, North Carolina =

Corinth, North Carolina
- Unincorporated community
- Location within North Carolina Location within the United States
- Coordinates: 36°00′15″N 78°00′31″W
- Country: United States
- State: North Carolina
- County: Nash
- Elevation: 236 ft (72 m)
- Time zone: UTC-5 (Eastern (EST))
  - Summer (DST): UTC-4 (EDT)
- Area code: 252
- GNIS feature ID: 1023924

Corinth is an unincorporated community in Nash County, North Carolina, United States. Corinth is located on North Carolina Highway 58, 3.15 miles (5.07 km) northwest of Nashville.
