= North Carolina Highway 4 =

State highway in Nash, Halifax, and Warren counties in North Carolina, US

North Carolina Highway 4

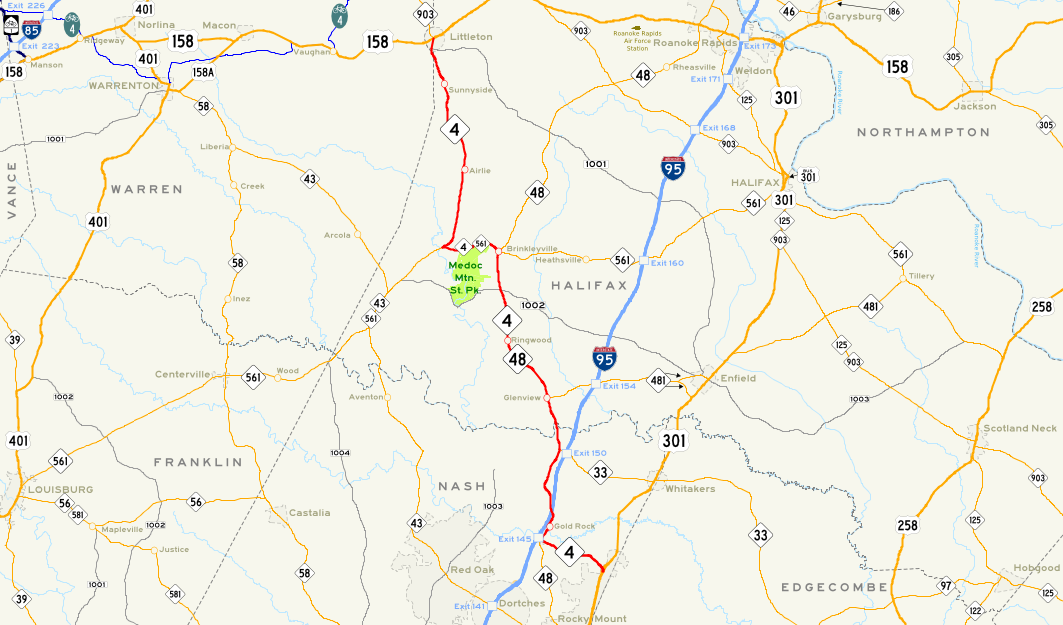

Route information
- Maintained by NCDOT
- Length: 34.7 mi (55.8 km)
- Existed: 1934 –present

Major junctions
- South end: US 301 near Rocky Mount
- I-95 near Rocky Mount
- North end: US 158 / NC 903 in Littleton

Location
- Country: United States
- State: North Carolina
- Counties: Nash, Halifax, Warren

Highway system
- North Carolina Highway System; Interstate; US; State; Scenic
← NC 3	→ NC 5

North Carolina Highway 4 (NC 4) is a primary state highway in the U.S. state of North Carolina. Running near the Virginia state line in Nash and Halifax Counties, NC 4 connects the region with I-95.

== Route description ==
The southern terminus of NC 4 is at US 301 near Rocky Mount. After heading west, NC 4 joins NC 48 near I-95 with exit/entrance ramps (exit 145); numerous hotels can be found here, built especially for I-95 travelers. After heading north for about 15 miles (24 km), NC 4 splits from NC 48 and joins NC 561 near Medoc Mountain State Park, heading west. After several miles, the road splits off and heads north for about 12 miles (19 km) before entering Littleton and ending at US 158/NC 903 downtown.

NC 4 is one of the more rural roads in this part of the state; before entering Littleton, there are no incorporated towns along the route. This section of the state is mainly farmland.

== History ==
As North Carolina renumbered its state highways in 1934, NC 4 was commissioned as a short state highway, running only a few miles from US 158 to the community of Airlie, just south of Littleton. When NC 48 running from Airlie to Littleton is rerouted to the east in 1951, NC 4 was left to take its place. In 1984 NC 4 was extended southward, taking over parts of NC 561, NC 48, and the decommissioned I-95 Business to US 301. I-95 Business was intended to take traffic from US 301 to I-95, and NC 4 took over that role.

== Major intersections ==
County	Location	mi	km	Destinations	Notes
Nash	Rocky Mount	0.0	0.0	US 301 (Wesleyan Boulevard) – Wilson, Halifax	Interchange; Northbound US 301 to northbound NC 4 / Southbound NC 4 to US 301 southbound only
Nash	Gold Rock	3.8	6.1	I-95 / NC 48 south (Exit 145) – Fayetteville, Roanoke Rapids, Rocky Mount	South end of NC 48 overlap
Nash	Red Oak	8.9	14.3	NC 33 east – Whitakers	Western terminus of NC 33
Halifax	Glenview	11.7	18.8	NC 481 east – Enfield	Western terminus of NC 481
Halifax	Brinkleyville	20.0	32.2	NC 48 north / NC 561 east – Roanoke Rapids, Ahoskie	North end of NC 48 overlap; South end of NC 561 overlap
Halifax		23.2	37.3	NC 561 west – Centerville	North end of NC 561 overlap
Warren	No major junctions				
Halifax	Littleton	34.7	55.8	US 158 / NC 903 (Main Street) – Warrenton, Weldon	
1.000 mi = 1.609 km; 1.000 km = 0.621 mi: Concurrency terminus; Incomplete access
