= Halifax County, North Carolina =

County in North Carolina, United States

- County
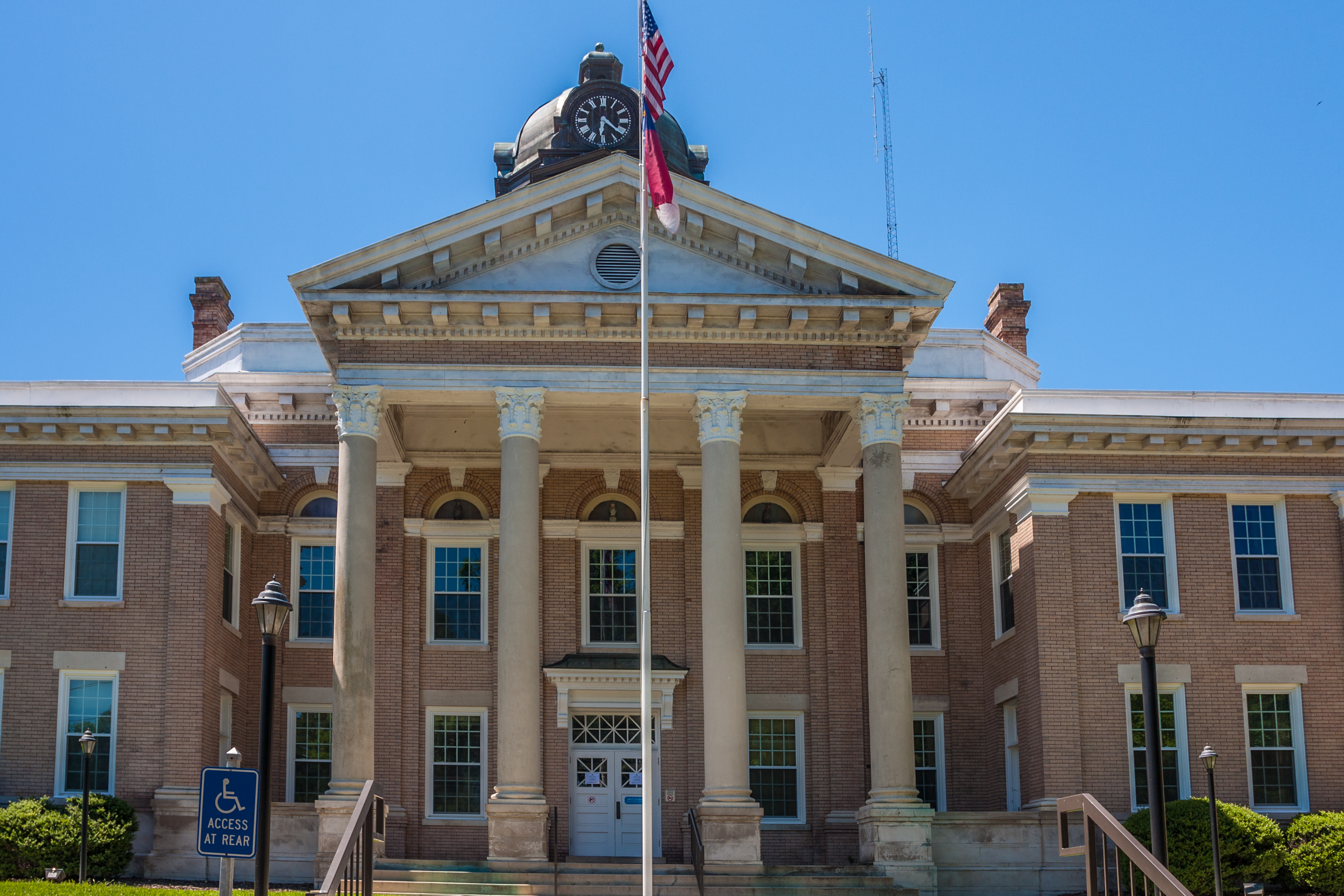
- Halifax County Courthouse

- Seal
- Nickname: Cradle of History
- Location within the U.S. state of North Carolina
- Interactive map of Halifax County, North Carolina
- Coordinates: 36.25°N 77.64°W
- Country: United States
- State: North Carolina
- Founded: 1758
- Named for: George Montagu-Dunk, 2nd Earl of Halifax
- Seat: Halifax
- Largest community: Roanoke Rapids

Area
  - Total: 730.27 sq mi (1,891.4 km^{2})
  - Land: 723.74 sq mi (1,874.5 km^{2})
  - Water: 6.53 sq mi (16.9 km^{2}) 0.89%

Population (2020)
  - Total: 48,622
  - Estimate (2025): 46,534 ▼
  - Density: 67.182/sq mi (25.939/km^{2})
- Time zone: UTC−5 (Eastern)
  - Summer (DST): UTC−4 (EDT)
- Congressional district: 1st
- Website: www.halifaxnc.com

Halifax County is a county located in the U.S. state of North Carolina. As of the 2020 census, the population was 48,622. Its county seat is Halifax. Halifax County is part of the Roanoke Rapids, NC Micropolitan Statistical Area, which is also included in the Rocky Mount-Wilson-Roanoke Rapids, NC Combined Statistical Area.

== History ==
Halifax County is located in North Carolina's Piedmont, Coastal Plain, and Atlantic Coast Flatwoods regions. The geography and history of the county were shaped by the Roanoke River, which forms its northern boundary. The county was formed from neighboring Edgecombe County in 1758. According to Preservation North Carolina, "Halifax County is one of the oldest counties in North Carolina with a rich history dating back to the earliest days of European settlement of North America. Over the years, Halifax County has provided North Carolina with more leaders – governors, congressmen, generals – than any other county in the state."

Originally the area was home to Tuscarora Indians and then it was settled in the 18th century by English and free Black colonists migrating south from Virginia and also from New Jersey.

The town of Halifax developed along the banks of the Roanoke River and established itself as the trading center for goods passing from settlement to settlement. The Roanoke River played a major role in the county's development, so much so that Halifax County was even considered as a potential capital of North Carolina. It remained a prosperous county until the railroads usurped the river as the major form of transportation. After Halifax County separated from Edgecombe County, the town of Halifax became the county seat (Enfield was the original county seat when Halifax was part of Edgecombe County). All territory within the boundaries of Edgecombe County north of Fishing Creek and Rainbow Banks on the Roanoke River (approximately 711 square miles) was officially designated as Halifax County on January 1, 1759. The current Halifax County towns include Enfield, Hobgood, Littleton, Roanoke Rapids, Scotland Neck, Weldon, and the County Seat, Halifax.

Besides having 40 sites on the National Register of Historic Places, Halifax County is also historically significant because of two events preceding the American Revolution. John Lord Carteret, the second Earl Granville, inherited a one-eighth share of Carolina territory originally granted to Sir George Carteret by the British Crown. The second Earl Granville administered the district (an area between the present Virginia-North Carolina border and a line about 65 miles south) from across the Atlantic, but there was little oversight and the land agents he put in charge of granting land, collecting rent and surveying for settlers – Edward Moseley, Francis Corbin and Thomas Child – were often accused of malfeasance by settlers and landowners.

On January 24, 1759, a group of men from Halifax and Edgecombe counties rode to Francis Corbin's house in Edenton and seized him during the night. The men were upset because Corbin had extorted money from them when collecting rents for Lord Granville who controlled the land on which they lived. Corbin was taken to Enfield, along with a co-conspirator Thomas Bodley – and the men were kept in jail for four days – until they agreed to acknowledge the corruption and set records straight. Enfield was the seat of the judicial district, including Northampton, Granville, and Edgecombe County, before Halifax became the county seat.

Although Corbin was eventually relieved of his duties by Lord Granville, a few months later a court accused the Halifax and Edgecombe men of kidnapping. The kidnappers were imprisoned in the Enfield jail and a second "riot" erupted on May 14, 1759, when a mob broke into the jail and freed the men who had kidnapped Corbin and Bodley. Distrust of the British Crown and the rule of royal governors continued to foment unrest in eastern North Carolina until the colony became the first of its peers to recommend American independence.

On April 12, 1776, the North Carolina Provincial Congress met in Halifax and passed a resolution known as the Halifax Resolves. The first resolution of its kind, the document instructed North Carolina's delegates to the Second Continental Congress in Philadelphia to vote for independence from Great Britain. The date of the Halifax Resolves is commemorated on the state's flag. Each year April 12 is celebrated as Halifax Day, with individuals in period costumes demonstrating colonial-era activities and craftsmanship.

== Geography ==
According to the U.S. Census Bureau, the county has a total area of 730.27 square miles (1,891.4 km^{2}), of which 723.74 square miles (1,874.5 km^{2}) is land and 6.53 square miles (16.9 km^{2}) (1.0%) is water.

Some of Halifax County's natural attractions include Medoc Mountain State Park, Lake Gaston, and Roanoke Rapids Lake. Sylvan Heights Bird Park in Scotland Neck is home to the world's largest collection of waterfowl. According to a North Carolina Deer Hunting 2016 -2017 study, Halifax County had the most number of harvested whitetail deer.

The Lakeland Arts Center, the Canal Arts Center, and the Roanoke Valley Players theater group are a few of the county's cultural institutions. With 328 seats and an 11-piece orchestra pit, Lakeland Theatre Company in Littleton marks several decades of showcasing plays and concerts. The Enfield Performing Arts Center had its first film festival in October 2017, featuring the work of local and nationally known film makers.

With 195,896 acres in farmland, Halifax County agricultural products include tobacco, peanuts, cotton, corn, soybeans. In addition, Halifax County sits in the heart of the great southern wood basket. The southern forests produce 12 percent of the world's wood product and 19 percent of its pulp and paper.

=== State and local protected areas/sites ===
- Brinkleyville Game Land
- Embro Game Land (part)
- Historic Halifax
- Lake Gaston Day Use Area (part)
- Lower Fishing Creek Game Land (part)
- Medoc Mountain State Park
- Roanoke Rapids Lake Day Use Area (part)
- Shocco Creek Game Land (part)
- Tillery Game Land
- Upper Roanoke River Wetlands Game Land (part)

=== Major water bodies ===
- Bear Swamp
- Beaverdam Swamp
- Deep Creek
- Fishing Creek
- Lake Gaston
- Little Quankey Swamp
- Marsh Swamp
- Martin Swamp
- Quankey Swamp
- Roanoke Rapids Lake
- Roanoke River
- Rocky Swamp

=== Adjacent counties ===
- Northampton County – north-northeast
- Bertie County – east
- Martin County – southeast
- Edgecombe County – south
- Nash County – south
- Franklin County – southwest
- Warren County – west

=== Major highways ===
- I-95
- US 158
- US 258
- US 301
- US 301 Bus.
- NC 4
- NC 43
- NC 48
- NC 97
- NC 122
- NC 125
- NC 481
- NC 481 Bus.
- NC 561
- NC 903

=== Major infrastructure ===
- Halifax County Motor Speedway
- Halifax-Northampton Regional Airport

== Demographics ==
Historical population
Census	Pop.	Note	%±
1790	14,310		—
1800	13,945		−2.6%
1810	15,620		12.0%
1820	17,237		10.4%
1830	17,739		2.9%
1840	16,865		−4.9%
1850	16,589		−1.6%
1860	19,442		17.2%
1870	20,408		5.0%
1880	30,300		48.5%
1890	28,908		−4.6%
1900	30,793		6.5%
1910	37,646		22.3%
1920	43,766		16.3%
1930	53,246		21.7%
1940	56,512		6.1%
1950	58,377		3.3%
1960	58,956		1.0%
1970	53,884		−8.6%
1980	55,286		2.6%
1990	55,516		0.4%
2000	57,370		3.3%
2010	54,691		−4.7%
2020	48,622		−11.1%
2025 (est.)	46,534	▼	−4.3%
U.S. Decennial Census; 1790–1960 1900–1990; 1990–2000 2010 2020

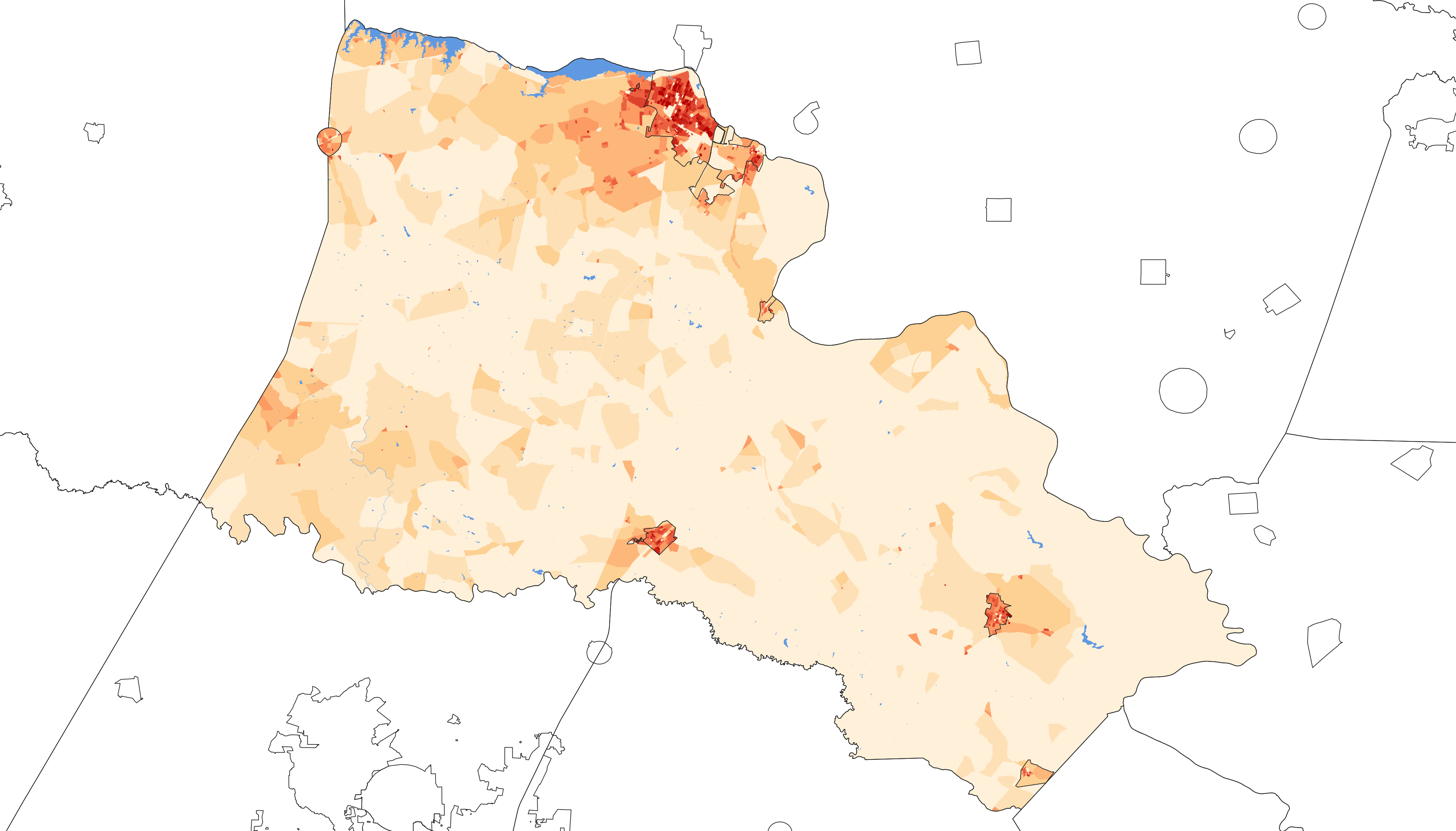
2020 population density of Halifax County NC by census block

=== 2020 census ===
Halifax County, North Carolina – Racial and ethnic composition Note: the US Census treats Hispanic/Latino as an ethnic category. This table excludes Latinos from the racial categories and assigns them to a separate category. Hispanics/Latinos may be of any race.
Race / Ethnicity (NH = Non-Hispanic)	Pop 1980	Pop 1990	Pop 2000	Pop 2010	Pop 2020	% 1980	% 1990	% 2000	% 2010	% 2020
White alone (NH)	27,446	25,915	24,269	21,569	19,070	49.64%	46.68%	42.30%	39.44%	39.22%
Black or African American alone (NH)	25,743	27,488	30,018	28,986	24,737	46.56%	49.51%	52.32%	53.00%	50.88%
Native American or Alaska Native alone (NH)	1,217	1,707	1,778	2,008	1,593	2.20%	3.07%	3.10%	3.67%	3.28%
Asian alone (NH)	86	143	310	357	281	0.16%	0.26%	0.54%	0.65%	0.58%
Native Hawaiian or Pacific Islander alone (NH)	x	x	6	8	11	x	x	0.01%	0.01%	0.02%
Other race alone (NH)	333	26	58	49	142	0.60%	0.05%	0.10%	0.09%	0.29%
Mixed race or Multiracial (NH)	x	x	352	562	1,334	x	x	0.61%	1.03%	2.74%
Hispanic or Latino (any race)	461	237	579	1,152	1,454	0.83%	0.43%	1.01%	2.11%	2.99%
Total	55,286	55,516	57,370	54,691	48,622	100.00%	100.00%	100.00%	100.00%	100.00%

As of the 2020 census, there were 48,622 people and 13,680 families residing in the county; the median age was 46.1 years. 19.8% of residents were under the age of 18 and 22.3% of residents were 65 years of age or older. For every 100 females there were 93.2 males, and for every 100 females age 18 and over there were 90.6 males age 18 and over.

The racial makeup of the county was 39.7% White, 51.1% Black or African American, 3.4% American Indian and Alaska Native, 0.6% Asian, <0.1% Native Hawaiian and Pacific Islander, 1.8% from some other race, and 3.4% from two or more races. Hispanic or Latino residents of any race comprised 3.0% of the population.

43.9% of residents lived in urban areas, while 56.1% lived in rural areas.

There were 20,707 households in the county, of which 26.5% had children under the age of 18 living in them. Of all households, 35.3% were married-couple households, 20.8% were households with a male householder and no spouse or partner present, and 37.8% were households with a female householder and no spouse or partner present. About 34.0% of all households were made up of individuals and 17.0% had someone living alone who was 65 years of age or older.

There were 24,735 housing units, of which 16.3% were vacant. Among occupied housing units, 63.6% were owner-occupied and 36.4% were renter-occupied. The homeowner vacancy rate was 1.5% and the rental vacancy rate was 7.7%.

=== 2010 census ===
At the 2010 census, there were 54,691 people living in the county. 53.2% were Black or African American, 40.0% White, 3.8% Native American, 0.7% Asian, 1.1% of some other race and 1.2% of two or more races. 2.1% were Hispanic or Latino (of any race).

=== 2000 census ===
At the 2000 census, there were 57,370 people, 22,122 households, and 15,308 families living in the county. The population density was 79 people per square mile (31 people/km^{2}). There were 25,309 housing units at an average density of 35 units per square mile (14 units/km^{2}). The racial makeup of the county was 52.56% Black or African American, 42.57% White, 3.14% Native American, 0.54% Asian, 0.02% Pacific Islander, 0.47% from other races, and 0.71% from two or more races. 1.01% of the population were Hispanic or Latino of any race.

There were 22,122 households, out of which 31.20% had children under the age of 18 living with them, 44.10% were married couples living together, 20.40% had a female householder with no husband present, and 30.80% were non-families. 27.70% of all households were made up of individuals, and 12.00% had someone living alone who was 65 years of age or older. The average household size was 2.51 and the average family size was 3.06.

In the county, the population was spread out, with 26.20% under the age of 18, 8.00% from 18 to 24, 27.70% from 25 to 44, 23.20% from 45 to 64, and 14.90% who were 65 years of age or older. The median age was 37 years. For every 100 females there were 90.70 males. For every 100 females age 18 and over, there were 86.00 males.

The median income for a household in the county was $26,459, and the median income for a family was $33,515. Males had a median income of $28,025 versus $20,524 for females. The per capita income for the county was $13,810. About 19.40% of families and 26.1% of the population were below the poverty line, including 33.00% of those under age 18 and 22.40% of those age 65 or over.

== Government and politics ==
Halifax County is a member of the regional Upper Coastal Plain Council of Governments. With its large African American population, Halifax County has long been a Democratic stronghold. The last Republican to carry the county in a presidential election was Richard Nixon in 1972.

Halifax County is part of North Carolina's 1st Congressional District in the United States House of Representatives, represented by Democrat Don Davis.

Halifax County is represented by Rodney Pierce in the 27th district in the North Carolina House of Representatives. Sen. Norman Sanderson represents the County in the NC State Senate.

The Haliwa-Saponi Indian Tribe was recognized as a Native American tribe by the state of North Carolina in 1965 and mostly comprises members in Warren and Halifax counties. The tribal government provides services to its members. It is headquartered in Hollister.

United States presidential election results for Halifax County, North Carolina
Year	Republican		Democratic		Third party(ies)	
Year	No.	%	No.	%	No.	%
1912	42	1.70%	2,300	92.85%	135	5.45%
1916	299	11.45%	2,312	88.51%	1	0.04%
1920	524	13.26%	3,429	86.74%	0	0.00%
1924	268	7.48%	3,232	90.20%	83	2.32%
1928	890	15.42%	4,882	84.58%	0	0.00%
1932	306	4.53%	6,413	94.98%	33	0.49%
1936	308	3.61%	8,230	96.39%	0	0.00%
1940	361	4.33%	7,982	95.67%	0	0.00%
1944	440	5.92%	6,989	94.08%	0	0.00%
1948	505	7.10%	6,172	86.82%	432	6.08%
1952	2,210	20.06%	8,807	79.94%	0	0.00%
1956	2,346	22.99%	7,860	77.01%	0	0.00%
1960	2,343	20.89%	8,872	79.11%	0	0.00%
1964	4,757	34.70%	8,952	65.30%	0	0.00%
1968	3,148	20.72%	4,927	32.43%	7,116	46.84%
1972	8,908	66.60%	4,241	31.71%	226	1.69%
1976	5,257	39.66%	7,892	59.54%	105	0.79%
1980	6,033	41.19%	8,364	57.10%	251	1.71%
1984	8,832	48.65%	9,278	51.11%	43	0.24%
1988	7,462	46.03%	8,726	53.83%	23	0.14%
1992	5,769	32.40%	9,960	55.94%	2,075	11.65%
1996	5,700	35.40%	9,551	59.31%	852	5.29%
2000	6,698	39.47%	10,222	60.24%	50	0.29%
2004	8,088	41.17%	11,528	58.68%	31	0.16%
2008	8,961	35.71%	16,047	63.96%	83	0.33%
2012	8,763	33.60%	17,176	65.86%	140	0.54%
2016	9,031	35.88%	15,748	62.57%	388	1.54%
2020	10,080	39.13%	15,545	60.35%	134	0.52%
2024	9,778	40.80%	14,014	58.48%	173	0.72%

== Communities ==
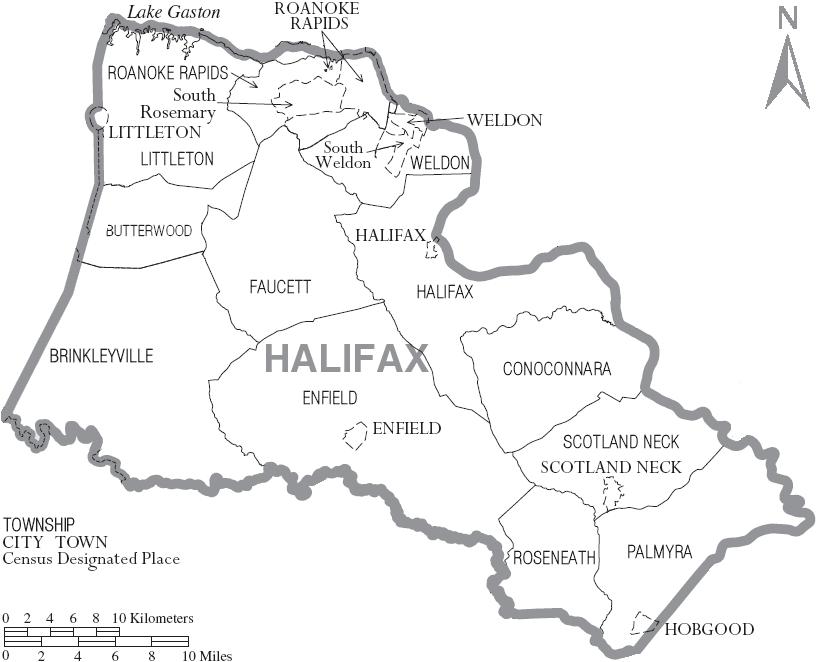
Map of Halifax County with municipal and township labels

=== City ===
- Roanoke Rapids (largest community)

=== Towns ===
- Enfield
- Halifax (county seat)
- Hobgood
- Littleton
- Scotland Neck
- Weldon

=== Townships ===
- Brinkleyville
- Butterwood
- Conoconnara
- Enfield
- Faucett
- Halifax
- Hobgood
- Littleton
- Palmyra
- Roanoke Rapids
- Roseneath
- Scotland Neck
- Weldon

=== Census-designated places ===
- Hollister
- South Rosemary
- South Weldon

=== Unincorporated communities ===
- Aurelian Springs
- Brinkleyville
- Charleston
- Essex
- Heathsville

== Notable people ==
- Willis Alston – U.S. congressman
- John R. Bryant – member of the North Carolina Senate
- Walter Clark – chief justice of the North Carolina Supreme Court
- John Crowell – politician
- Joseph J. Daniel – justice in the North Carolina Supreme Court
- John Eaton – diplomat, U.S. senator, and U.S. secretary of war
- Catherine Devereux Edmondston – diarist, essayist, and poet
- Henry Eppes – member of the North Carolina Senate
- Ricky Kej - 3-time Grammy® Award-winning musician
- W. T. J. Hayes – politician
- Isaac H. Hilliard – planter and cotton factor
- James Hogun – general in the Continental Army during the American Revolutionary War
- William H. Kitchin – U.S. congressman
- James Robert McLean – Confederate politician and soldier
- Bartholomew F. Moore – North Carolina attorney general and legislator
- William Rabun – governor of Georgia
- John Sitgreaves – U.S. district court judge
- Maurice Smith – former professional football player
- Starling Tucker – politician in South Carolina
- Mary Welch – Broadway actress
- Tom Winslow – folk singer and writer

== See also ==
- Halifax County Schools
- List of counties in North Carolina
- National Register of Historic Places listings in Halifax County, North Carolina
- Haliwa-Saponi, state-recognized tribe that resides in the county
- Vine Hill Academy
- Halifax, Canada (a similarly named port city in Canada)

== Works cited ==
- Wilson, Bev (2018). "Isha Black or Isha White? Racial Identity and Spatial Development in Warren County, NC". Planning Theory & Practice. 19 (2): 261–265. doi:10.1080/14649357.2018.1456816.
