= Interstate 95 Business =

Interstate 95 Business may refer to the following Business Interstate Highways that connect to Interstate 95:

- Interstate 95 Business (Brunswick, Georgia)
- Interstate 95 Business (Darien, Georgia)
- Interstate 95 Business (North Carolina), serving the Fayetteville area
- Interstate 95 Business (Rocky Mount, North Carolina), a former business route
- Interstate 95 Business (Walterboro, South Carolina)
