= Tillery, North Carolina =

Community in North Carolina

Coordinates: 36°15′07″N 77°29′08″W

Tillery is an unincorporated community in Halifax County, North Carolina, that was a plantation and is now home to a museum. Tillery was incorporated as a town in 1889. Franklin Roosevelt's Resettlement Administration instituted a New Deal era resettlement program in the area. In 1936 it was renamed Roanoke Farms. The ZIP Code for Tillery is 27887.

== History ==
W. H. Randolph was its first mayor.

The Tillery Chapel Rosenwald Elementary School was a Rosenwald School established for the community. Tillery Chapel Elementary school also served the community until it closed in 1981. It became a community center.

The Hermitage is a historic plantation house in Tillery.

James M. Pittman served as Tillery's postmaster.

Roanoke River Correctional Institution, formerly Caledonia Correctional, is in Tillery.
