= Essex, North Carolina =

- Unincorporated community
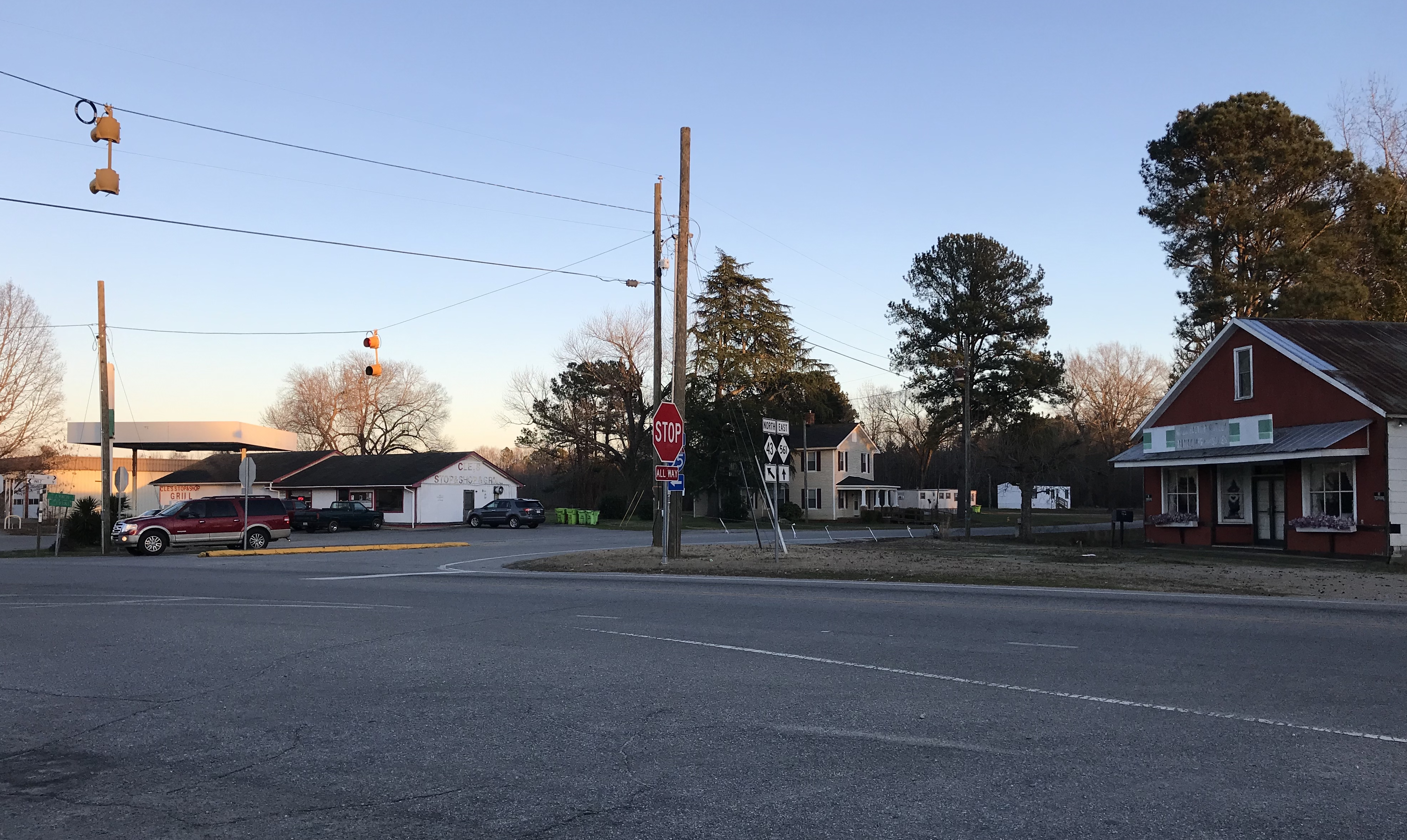

- Location within North Carolina Location within the United States
- Coordinates: 36°14′49″N 77°57′24″W
- Country: United States
- State: North Carolina
- County: Halifax
- Elevation: 272 ft (83 m)
- Time zone: UTC-5 (Eastern (EST))
  - Summer (DST): UTC-4 (EDT)
- Area code: 252
- GNIS feature ID: 984837

Essex is an unincorporated community in Halifax County, North Carolina, United States.
