= Rocky Mount–Wilson Regional Airport =

Airport serving Rocky Mount and Wilson in North Carolina, United States

- IATA: RWI; ICAO: KRWI; FAA LID: RWI

Summary
- Airport type: Public
- Owner: Rocky Mount–Wilson Airport Authority
- Serves: Rocky Mount / Wilson, North Carolina
- Elevation AMSL: 158 ft (48 m)
- Coordinates: 35°51′23″N 077°53′31″W
- Interactive map of Rocky Mount–Wilson Regional Airport

Runways
Direction	Length		Surface
Direction	ft	m	Surface
4/22	7,099	2,164	Asphalt

Statistics (2017)
- Aircraft operations (year ending 3/31/2017): 29,810
- Based aircraft: 41
- Source: Federal Aviation Administration

Rocky Mount–Wilson Regional Airport (IATA: RWI, ICAO: KRWI, FAA LID: RWI) is a public airport located seven miles (11 km) southwest of the central business district of Rocky Mount, a city located in Nash and Edgecombe Counties in the U.S. state of North Carolina. It is also north of Wilson, a city in Wilson County. The airport is owned by the Rocky Mount–Wilson Airport Authority.

== History ==
The city of Rocky Mount was first served through an airfield less than a mile north of the city, code RMT, until 1970 when commercial air service was moved to the current airfield, RWI, located in between the cities of Rocky Mount and Wilson. Piedmont Airlines served RMT from 1961 to 1970 and RWI from 1970 to 1980. CCAir, operating as US Airways Express, later provided scheduled service to RWI, but traffic fell after the arrival of Southwest Airlines at nearby Raleigh-Durham International Airport (RDU) in 1999, which made flights from RDU relatively inexpensive. The US Airways Express service was suspended in March 2001 and replaced with shuttle bus service to RDU.

== Facilities and aircraft ==
Rocky Mount–Wilson Regional Airport covers an area of 364 acres (147 ha) which contains one asphalt paved runway (4/22) measuring 7,099 ft × 150 ft (2,164 m × 46 m).

For the 12-month period ending March 31, 2017, the airport had 29,810 aircraft operations, an average of 82 per day: 94% general aviation, 4% air taxi, 2% military and <1% scheduled commercial. There was at the time 41 aircraft based at this airport: 27 single engine, 7 multi-engine, 4 jet, 2 helicopter, and 1 glider.

== See also ==
- List of airports in North Carolina
