= Medoc Mountain State Park =

State park in North Carolina, United States

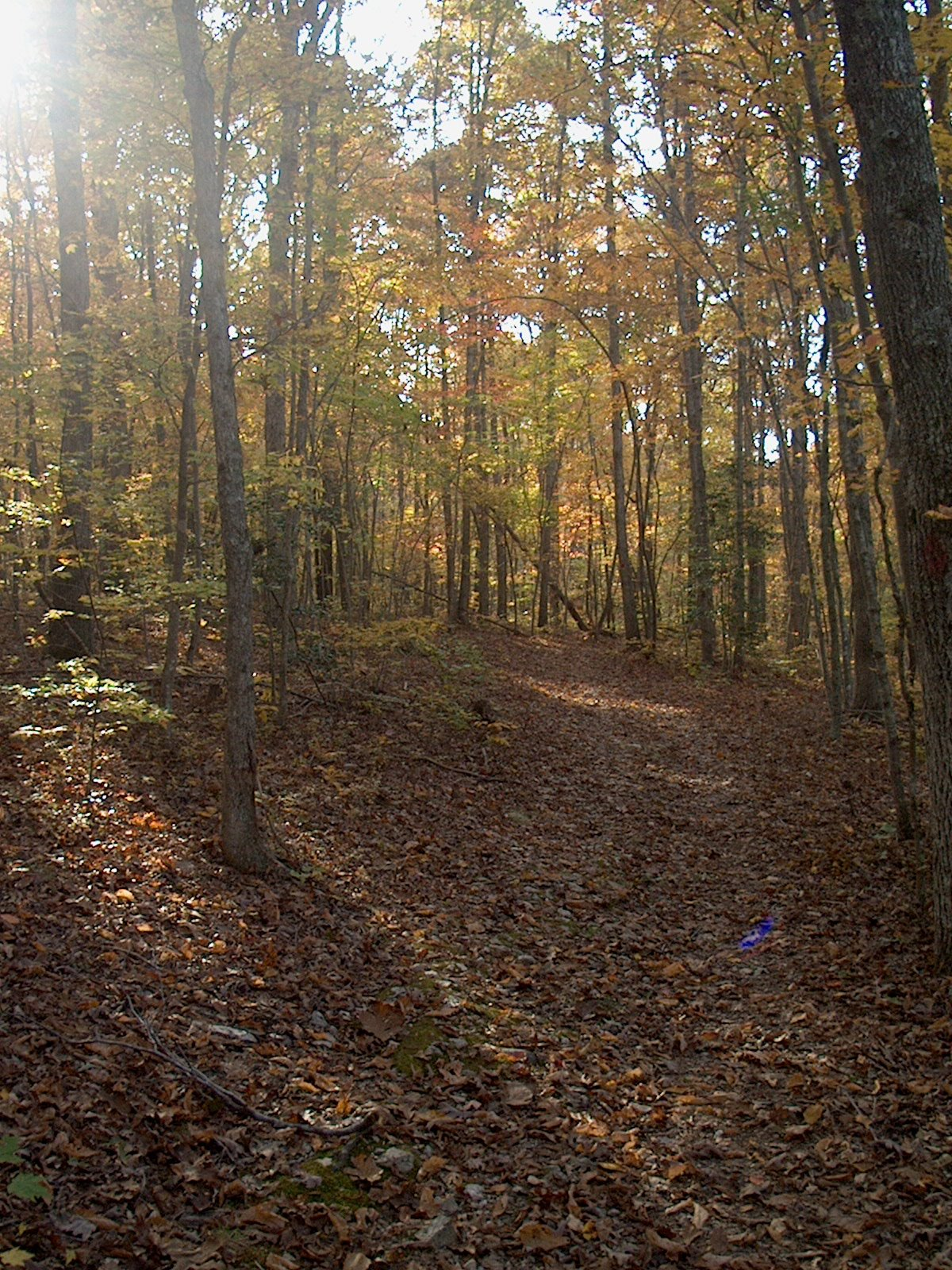

- Location within North Carolina Location within the United States
- Interactive map of Medoc Mountain State Park
- Location: Halifax County, North Carolina, United States
- Coordinates: 36°15′50″N 77°53′18″W
- Area: 3,893 acres (1,575 ha)
- Elevation: 221 ft (67 m)
- Established: 1973
- Administrator: North Carolina Division of Parks and Recreation
- Website: Official website

Medoc Mountain State Park is a 3,893-acre (1,575 ha) North Carolina state park in Halifax County, North Carolina in the United States. It is near Hollister, North Carolina in eastern North Carolina and includes the 325 foot (99 m) peak Medoc Mountain.

== History ==
Medoc Mountain is not really a mountain at all; its highest point reaches an elevation of only 325 feet (99 m) above sea level. It is, rather, the core of what was once a mighty range of mountains — Medoc Mountain is what remains after millions of years of erosion. The eroded peaks were formed by volcanic action during the Paleozoic Age, about 350 million years ago. An elongated structure of biotite granite, Medoc Mountain has effectively routed the streams of the area around itself and has resisted the erosion typical of the surrounding lowlands. The park sits near the fall line, an area where the hard, resistant rocks of the foothills give way to the softer rocks and sediments of the coastal plain. The northern and western faces of Medoc Mountain have very steep slopes, dropping 160 feet over a distance of less than a quarter mile.

The mountain and surrounding land have long been used for agriculture. Once the property of Sidney Weller, a farmer and educator, the area was used for the cultivation of grapes in the 19th century. Weller produced a highly acclaimed wine known as Weller's Halifax and is credited with developing the American system of grape culture and winemaking. It was Weller who named the mountain "Medoc," after a province in the Bordeaux region of France famous for its vineyards. Weller organized and operated an academy for area children and assisted with the development of the first North Carolina state fair in 1853.

Following Weller's death in 1854, his land was sold. The vineyards continued to produce into the early 20th century, but the land was later subdivided, sold and used for the production of other crops. The vineyards disappeared, and little trace of them remains. The high ridge and the slopes of Little Fishing and Bear Swamp creeks are the only places in the area that have not been extensively cultivated. A grist mill operated in the area until the late 19th century.

In the 1920s, a Boy Scout camp was built on the summit of the mountain and, a few years later, lumbermen cut the mountain forest for timber. In the early 1930s, a deposit of molybdenum was discovered near the summit. Exploration of the site occurred then and again in the late 1960s, scarring the land though no significant mining operations took place. For many years, local residents used the area for hunting, horseback riding and hiking.

In 1970, citizens proposed the creation of a state park in the area. In 1972, the North Carolina Division of Parks and Recreation surveyed a five-county area for a suitable site and recommended Medoc Mountain and the surrounding land. The first land purchases were made in 1973. The Halifax Development Commission obtained a one-year option to purchase timber on the mountain from Union Camp, allowing the state time to acquire 2,300 acres (9 km^{2}) of land to establish the park.

The state acquired the first parcel for the park in October 1973, and more than 2,200 acres (890 ha) had been purchased by March 1975. In 2007, The Nature Conservancy sold three additional tracts totaling 1,530 acres (620 ha) to the state for inclusion in the park.

== Recreation ==
The park has 29 miles (47 km) of hiking trails, 9 miles (14 km) of biking trails, and 10 miles (16 km) of horseback-riding trails. Its overnight facilities include tent, group, equestrian, and full-hookup campsites, as well as heated and air-conditioned cabins that accommodate six people.

== Events ==
Medoc Mountain State Park is host to the annual Medoc Trail Races, which consist of a 10-mile race and a full trail marathon. A former event, the Medoc Trail Marathon, saw its inaugural run on October 4, 2008.
