= U.S. Route 13 in North Carolina =

Highway in North Carolina

U.S. Highway 13
- US 13 highlighted in red

Route information
- Maintained by NCDOT
- Length: 189.1 mi (304.3 km)
- Existed: 1952–present
- Tourist routes: Blue-Gray Scenic Byway; Edenton-Windsor Loop; Lafayette's Tour

Major junctions
- South end: I-95 / I-295 in Eastover
- US 421 in Spivey's Corner; US 701 in Newton Grove; US 70 / US 117 in Goldsboro; I-42 near Goldsboro; US 258 in Snow Hill; US 264 in Greenville; US 64 near Bethel; US 17 in Windsor; US 158 in Winton
- North end: US 13 at the Virginia state line near Somerton, VA

Location
- Country: United States
- State: North Carolina
- Counties: Cumberland, Sampson, Wayne, Greene, Pitt, Edgecombe, Martin, Bertie, Hertford, Gates

Highway system
- United States Numbered Highway System; List; Special; Divided; North Carolina Highway System; Interstate; US; State; Scenic
← NC 12	→ NC 14

U.S. Route 13 (US 13) is a United States Numbered Highway running from Eastover, North Carolina to Morrisville, Pennsylvania. In North Carolina, it runs along a northeast–southwest alignment for 189.1 miles (304.3 km) connecting the cities of Fayetteville, Goldsboro, Greenville, Williamston, and Ahoskie. The southern terminus is located at Interstate 95 (I-95) and I-295 near Eastover. From the terminus, US 13 travels along a northeastern–southwestern alignment through Newton Grove to US 117 in Mar-Mac. US 13 runs concurrently along US 117 north to Goldsboro, where it also shares a brief concurrency with US 70. The highway continues northeastward to Greenville and then turns to the north until reaching US 64 near Bethel. US 13 and US 64 run concurrently to the east until Williamston where US 13 diverges to the north, concurrent with US 17. In Windsor, US 13 diverges from US 17 and runs northward through Ahoskie. US 13 turns to the northeast near Winton and continues in that direction until reaching the Virginia state line near Gates.

In the 1925 plan for the U.S. Numbered Highway System, US 13 was to enter North Carolina south of Norfolk, Virginia, and continue southward to Wilmington. However, the finalized 1926 plan moved the southern terminus of US 13 to Norfolk while US 17 was assigned the corridor to Wilmington. In 1952, US 13 was extended south of Norfolk to Windsor, entering North Carolina at its modern-day location. US 13 was extended south to US 70 and US 117 in Goldsboro in 1957 and to I-95 near Eastover in 1963. Since 1963, US 13 has undergone some minor realignments and widening along its route, but the corridor has remained the same.

== Route description ==
=== Interstate 95 to Newton Grove ===
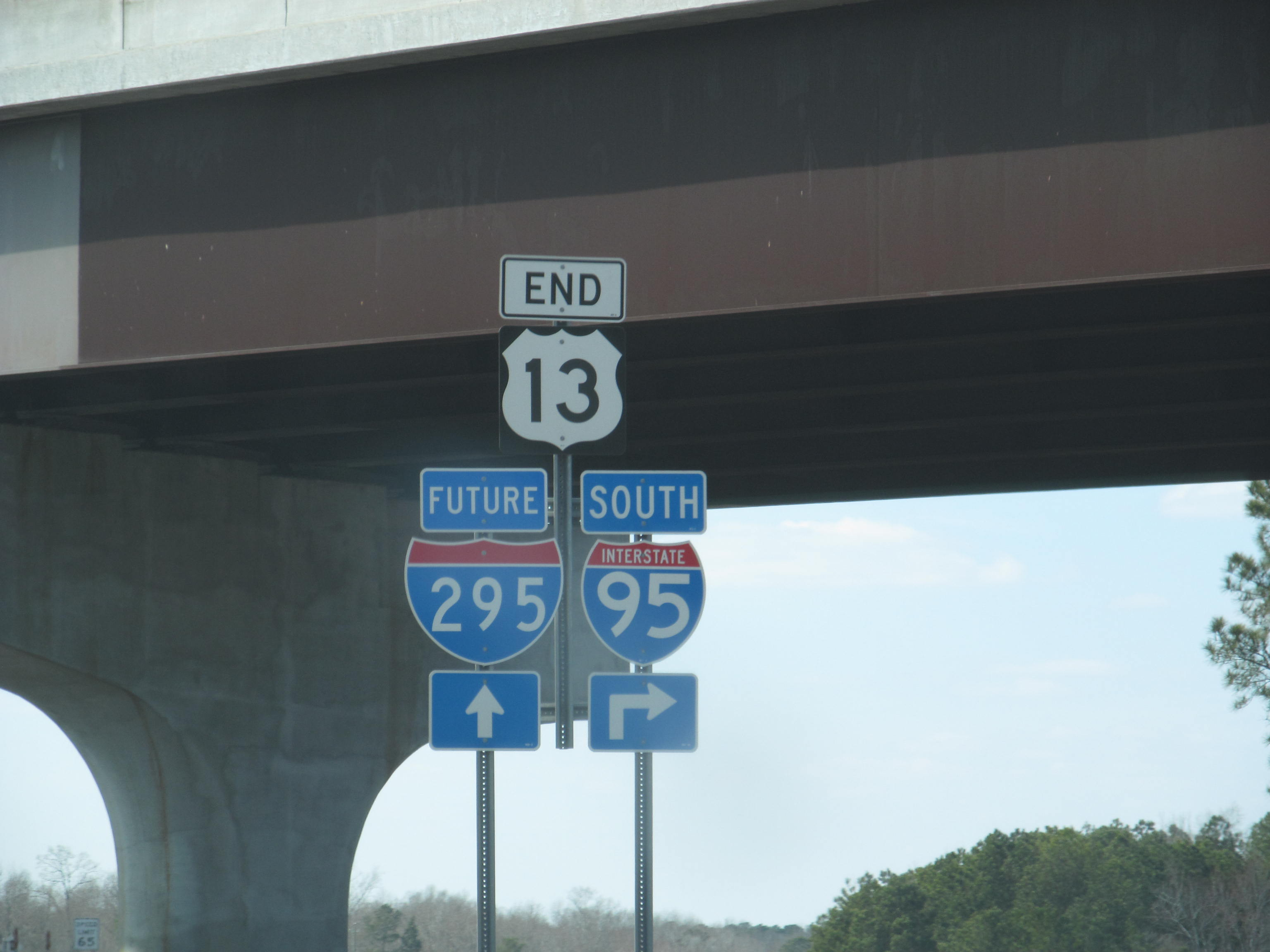
Southern terminus in Eastover, near Fayetteville

US 13 begins at a hybrid interchange incorporating elements of a cloverleaf, a directional T, and a diamond, consisting of a junction with I-95 (exit 58) and I-295 (Fayetteville Outer Loop) near Fayetteville in Cumberland County. It quickly reduces its lane count from the four of the I-295 freeway to two lanes with dirt shoulders. It bears eastward, passing through sparsely developed forest and farmlands and quickly crossing the county border and entering Sampson County. The route turns slightly northeast and passes through Spivey's Corner, where the road intersects US 421, otherwise known as Spivey's Corner Highway.

Nearing Newton Grove, US 13 passes over I-40 with no direct access. The route then enters the small town and is interrupted by a large roundabout which brings three routes—itself, North Carolina Highway 50 (NC 50) along Raleigh Street from the west and Mount Olive Drive from the east, and US 701 along Main Street from the north and Clinton Street from the south—to a central point in the city.

=== Newton Grove to Goldsboro ===
Continuing north from Newton Grove, US 13 enters Wayne County, traveling more easterly through more farmland and forests. After several miles, it curves northeast and meets US 117 at an intersection. Here, it turns north on the four-lane, divided highway and begins to travel around the west side of Goldsboro, the beginning of a partial beltway around the city. Before turning east again, US 13 leaves US 117 at an at-grade intersection, the latter of which upgrades into a freeway. US 117 travels along with US 13.

US 13 circles around the city on a four-lane, divided freeway alignment after another at-grade intersection, immediately interchanging with NC 581. Shortly after, it meets US 70 at a partial cloverleaf interchange, and US 70 joins the other two routes on its path east. The next interchange sends US 117 north at a partial trumpet interchange; US 117 continues north until it intersects US 301. US 13 and US 70 continue east, next interchanging NC 111. The road interchanges Wayne Memorial Drive and Spence Avenue before curving southward. The freeway then interchanges with Berkeley Boulevard, where US 13 leaves. US 70 continues on the freeway, while US 13 turns northeast on Berkeley Boulevard, leaving the Goldsboro area and interchanging with I-42.

=== Goldsboro to US 64 ===
US 13 continues northeast, passing through one last community of Goldsboro where it meets I-42 before entering open fields and forests once again and entering Greene County. Outside Snow Hill, NC 58 joins US 13 and becomes Kingold Boulevard. US 13 leaves Kingold Boulevard once in the center of town, continuing northeast via Contentnea Boulevard.

Contentnea Boulevard outside the city meets an intersection with US 258 and NC 903, which join US 13. The other side of the four-way intersection continues as NC 91. NC 903 leaves after two curves of the road, leaving US 13 and US 258 to continue northeast through farmland. US 13 leaves US 258 after a stretch, turning east to meet and run concurrent with US 264, Dickinson Avenue. This arrangement continues until Greenville, where US 264 leaves, and US 13 bisects the city on Memorial Drive, forming concurrencies with NC 43, NC 903, and NC 11. The concurrency eventually drops NC 43 and later picks up NC 33 and drops it, also dropping NC 903 before it heads northward. Still a four-lane divided road, it bypasses the town of Bethel before it meets a diamond interchange with the US 64 freeway in the corner of Edgecombe County. US 13 turns east onto this freeway, while NC 11 continues northward.

=== US 64 to Virginia ===
US 13 and US 64 travel eastward to Williamston. The roadway curves around the south and east sides of the city, where US 17 joins and US 64 leaves. US 13/US 17 continue north on a four lane alignment until Williamston, where it bypasses the town to the west. On the north side, though, US 13 leaves at an interchange on North King Street, traveling north on a two-lane road, while US 17 carries the freeway east towards the ocean.

The road continues through the farm and forest medium until it enters Ahoskie on city streets, forming concurrencies with NC 42 and NC 561. These leave in the city before US 13 exits, finally crossing into Gates County along with US 158. The concurrency travels for a few miles, the roads separating before the Virginia state border. Here, US 13 continues into Virginia as Whaleyville Boulevard.

=== Scenic byways ===
Blue-Gray Scenic Byway is an 82-mile (132 km) byway from Four Oaks to Trenton. US 13 overlap a short four-mile (6.4 km) section of the byway, from Bentonville Road to Grantham School Road, northeast of Newton Grove. The byway is noted for its Civil War history.

Edenton-Windsor Loop is an 87-mile (140 km) is a double loop byway connecting the cities of Edenton and Windsor. US 13 and US 13 Business (US 13 Bus.) together form a short 2.7-mile (4.3 km) section of the loop, in Windsor. The byway is noted for historical homes in Edenton, the Sans Souci Ferry, the scenic river and coastal views, and history.

Lafayette's Tour is a 173-mile (278 km) byway from Halifax to Lynch's Corner, in the Great Dismal Swamp. US 13 overlap a short four-mile (6.4 km) section of the byway; from US 258, near Winton, to NC 137. The byway is noted and named after the French General Gilbert du Motier, Marquis de Lafayette, who visited the area in 1825. It is also noted for the Parker Island Cable Ferry, swamps/bogs, and history.

== History ==
Established in 1952, US 13 came south from Virginia, replacing NC 97 from the state line to Windsor and ending at US 17 (now NC 308).

Around 1956, US 13 was extended south to Goldsboro following US 17 to Williamston, US 64 to Bethel, NC 11 to Greenville, US 264 to Farmville, US 258 to Snow Hill, and NC 102 to Goldsboro. Following west on US 70, it ended at the US 117 interchange.

In 1957, Windsor was bypassed, creating US 13 Bus. following the old downtown route. By 1960, US 13 was extended southwest again, replacing NC 102, to its current southern terminus at I-95. In 1970, US 13 moved onto cutoff road between US 258 and US 264, removing Farmville completely from the route. In 1974, Winton was bypassed, the old alignment became part of NC 45 and NC 461.

By 2000, US 13 was placed on new freeway from Bethel to Robersonville, with US 64; the old alignment became US 64 Alternate. In 2002, it was extended to Williamston. In 2004, Bethel was bypassed, creating US 13 Bus. following the old main street route.

== Junction list ==
County	Location	mi	km	Exit	Destinations	Notes
Cumberland	Eastover	0.0	0.0		I-95 / I-295 south – Fayetteville, Lumberton, Benson	I-95 Exit 58; Road continues as I-295
Cumberland	Eastover	0.2	0.32		To US 301 / Pembroke Lane	
Cumberland		7.0	11.3		NC 82 west (Herb Farm Road) – Falcon	Eastern terminus of NC 82
Sampson	Spivey's Corner	16.6	26.7		US 421 / NC 242 (Plain View Highway / Spiveys Corner Highway) – Dunn, Clinton	
Sampson	Newton Grove	25.0	40.2		US 701 / NC 50 / NC 55 (Weeks Circle) to I-40 – Clinton, Mount Olive, Smithfield, Raleigh	Roundabout
Wayne	Mar-Mac	45.0	72.4		US 117 south (R.B. Nelson Highway) – Mount Olive	South end of US 117 overlap
Wayne	Goldsboro	47.0	75.6		NC 581 south (Arlington Bridge Road)	South end of NC 581 overlap
Wayne	Goldsboro	47.9	77.1		US 117 Bus. north (George Street)	
Wayne	Goldsboro	49.4	79.5	49A	NC 581 north to I-795 north / US 70 west – Wilson, Raleigh	North end of NC 581 overlap
Wayne	Goldsboro	49.8	80.1	49B	To NC 581 / Ash Street	
Wayne	Goldsboro	50.5	81.3	50	US 70 west / US 70 Bus. east (Grantham Street) – Raleigh	West end of US 70 overlap
Wayne	Goldsboro	51.1	82.2	51A	US 117 north – Wilson	North end of US 117 overlap
Wayne	Goldsboro	51.5	82.9	51B	US 117 Bus. / NC 111 north (William Street)	North end of NC 111 overlap
Wayne	Goldsboro	52.5	84.5	52	Wayne Memorial Drive	
Wayne	Goldsboro	53.8	86.6	54	Cuyler Best Road / Spence Avenue	
Wayne	Goldsboro	54.7	88.0	55	US 70 east / NC 111 south – Kinston	East end of US 70 and south end of NC 111 overlap
Wayne		58.1	93.5		I-42 – Kinston, Raleigh	I-42 Exit 45
Greene		70.1	112.8		NC 58 north – Wilson	North end of NC 58 overlap
Greene	Snow Hill	70.1	112.8		NC 58 south / NC 903 south (Kingold Boulevard) – Kinston	South end of NC 58/903 overlap
Greene	Snow Hill	72.5	116.7		US 258 south / NC 91 north – Walstonburg	South end of US 258 overlap
Greene		72.5	116.7		NC 903 north – Maury, Ayden	North end of NC 903 overlap
Greene	Lizzie	76.9	123.8		NC 123 south (Vandiford Thomas Road) – Maury	Northern terminus of NC 123
Greene		79.0	127.1		US 258 north – Farmville	North end of US 258 overlap
Pitt		82.6	132.9		US 264 west – Farmville	West end of US 264 overlap
Pitt		87.4	140.7		US 264 east / US 264 Alt. begins / NC 11 Byp. – Greenville, Kinston	East end of US 264 and west end of US 264 Alt overlap; exit 119 of NC 11 Bypass
Pitt	Greenville	89.5	144.0		US 264 Alt. east (Greenville Boulevard) – Washington	East end of US 264 Alt overlap
Pitt	Greenville	92.1	148.2		NC 11 south / NC 43 south / NC 903 south (Memorial Drive) – Kinston	South end of NC 11/43/903 overlap
Pitt	Greenville	93.1	149.8		NC 43 north (5th Street) – Rocky Mount	North end of NC 43 overlap
Pitt	Greenville	93.5	150.5	Memorial Boulevard Bridges over the Tar River		
Pitt	Greenville	95.9	154.3		NC 33 east (Greene Street)	East end of NC 33 overlap
Pitt	Greenville	96.3	155.0		NC 33 west (Belvoir Highway) – Tarboro	West end of NC 33 overlap
Pitt	Greenville	96.7	155.6		US 264 / NC 11 Byp. south (Martin Luther King Jr Highway) – Washington, Wilson	Exit 80 of US 264
Pitt	Greenville	97.5	156.9		NC 903 north (Briley Road) – Stokes, Robersonville	North end of NC 903 overlap
Pitt		105.8	170.3		NC 30 east – Stokes, Washington	Western terminus of NC 30
Pitt		106.1	170.8		US 13 Bus. north / NC 11 Bus. north (Main Street) – Bethel	
Pitt	Bethel	107.3	172.7		US 64 Alt. – Bethel, Parmele	
Edgecombe		109.1	175.6		US 13 Bus. south / NC 11 Bus. south (Main Street) – Bethel	
Edgecombe		109.3	175.9	496	US 64 west / NC 11 north – Tarboro, Oak City	West end of US 64 and north end of NC 11 overlap
Martin	Robersonville	116.0	186.7	502	NC 903 (Main Street) – Robersonville, Hamilton	
Martin		118.8	191.2	505	Robersonville Products Road	To Martin County Airport
Martin	Everetts	120.4	193.8	507	US 64 Alt. (Main Street) – Everetts	
Martin		125.0	201.2	512	NC 125 (Prison Camp Road) – Williamston	
Martin		127.3	204.9	514	US 17 south / US 17 Bus. north – Williamston, Washington	South end of US 17 overlap
Martin	Williamston	128.9	207.4	515	US 64 east – Plymouth, Manteo	East end of US 64 overlap
Martin	Williamston	129.1	207.8		US 64 Alt. (Jamesville Road)	
Martin	Williamston	130.3	209.7		US 17 Bus. south (Main Street)	
Bertie	Windsor	141.5	227.7		US 17 north / US 13 Bus. north – Windsor	North end of US 17 and south end of US 17 Bypass overlap
Bertie	Windsor	142.9	230.0		NC 308 (Sterlingworth Street) – Lewiston Woodville	
Bertie	Windsor	143.5	230.9	215	US 17 Byp. north / US 13 Bus. south (King Street) – Edenton, Windsor	North end of US 17 Bypass overlap
Bertie		149.0	239.8		NC 305 north – Aulander	
Bertie	Powellsville	160.1	257.7		NC 42 east (Main Street) – Colerain	East end of NC 42 overlap
Hertford	Ahoskie	163.6	263.3		NC 561 east – Harrellsville	East end of NC 561 overlap
Hertford	Ahoskie	165.2	265.9		NC 42 west (Academy Street) – Aulander	West end of NC 42 overlap
Hertford	Ahoskie	165.6	266.5		NC 561 west (1st Street) – Rich Square	West end of NC 561 overlap
Hertford		169.0	272.0		To NC 11 / Short Cut Road – Murfreesboro, Greenville	
Hertford		171.1	275.4		NC 461 west – Rich Square, Halifax	West end of NC 461 overlap
Hertford		171.8	276.5		NC 461 east (Old Highway 13) – Winton	East end of NC 461 overlap
Hertford	Winton	173.7	279.5		US 158 west / NC 45 east (Mulberry Street) – Murfreesboro, Winton	West end of US 158 overlap
Gates		177.8	286.1		NC 137 east – Gatesville	Western terminus of NC 137
Gates	Tarheel	180.3	290.2		US 158 east – Elizabeth City	East end of US 158 overlap; to Merchants Millpond State Park
Gates	Drum Hill	188.1	302.7		NC 37 south – Gatesville	Northern terminus of NC 37
Gates		189.1	304.3		US 13 north – Suffolk	Continuation into Virginia
1.000 mi = 1.609 km; 1.000 km = 0.621 mi: Concurrency terminus

== See also ==
- Special routes of U.S. Route 13
- North Carolina Bicycle Route 4 - Concurrent with US 13 from Winton to Eure

U.S. Route 13
Previous state: Terminus	North Carolina	Next state: Virginia
