= U.S. Route 258 =

U.S. Highway in North Carolina and Virginia

U.S. Route 258
- US 258 highlighted in red

Route information
- Auxiliary route of US 58
- Maintained by NCDOT, VDOT, and local city jurisdictions
- Length: 220.15 mi (354.30 km)
- Existed: 1932–present

Major junctions
- South end: US 17 Bus. / NC 24 Bus. in Jacksonville, NC
- US 70 in Kinston, NC; US 13 in Snow Hill, NC; I-587 in Farmville, NC; US 64 in Tarboro, NC; US 158 in Murfreesboro, NC; US 58 near Franklin, VA; US 460 in Windsor, VA; US 60 in Newport News, VA; US 17 in Newport News, VA; I-64 in Hampton, VA
- North end: SR 143 at Fort Monroe in Hampton, VA

Location
- Country: United States
- States: North Carolina, Virginia
- Counties: NC: Onslow, Jones, Lenoir, Greene, Pitt, Edgecombe, Halifax, Northampton, Hertford; VA: Southampton, City of Suffolk, Isle of Wight, City of Newport News, City of Hampton

Highway system
- United States Numbered Highway System; List; Special; Divided
- North Carolina Highway System; Interstate; US; State; Scenic
- Virginia Routes; Interstate; US; Primary; Secondary; Byways; History; HOT lanes
← NC 251	NC	→ NC 261
← SR 257	VA	→ SR 259

U.S. Route 258 (US 258) is a spur of US 58 in the U.S. states of North Carolina and Virginia. The U.S. Highway runs 220.15 miles (354.30 km) from US 17 Business and NC 24 Business in Jacksonville, North Carolina north to Virginia State Route 143 (SR 143) at Fort Monroe in Hampton, Virginia. In North Carolina, US 258 connects Jacksonville with the Inner Banks communities of Kinston, Snow Hill, Farmville, Tarboro, and Murfreesboro. The U.S. Highway continues through the Virginia city of Franklin, where the highway intersects US 58, and the town of Smithfield on its way to the Hampton Roads metropolitan area. US 258 crosses the James River on the James River Bridge and follows Mercury Boulevard through Newport News and Hampton.

== Route description ==
=== Jacksonville to Kinston ===
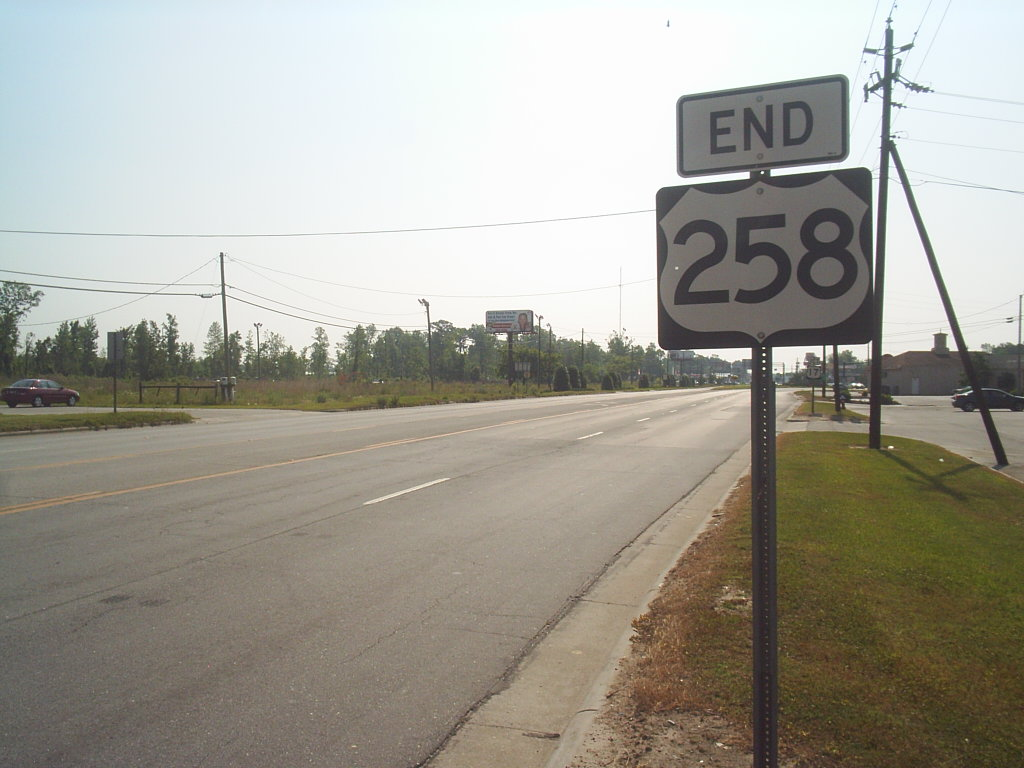
Southern terminus in Jacksonville, NC

US 258 begins at a directional intersection with US 17 Business and NC 24 Business in Jacksonville. The business routes head east together as Marine Boulevard toward downtown Jacksonville; US 17 Business heads southwest along Wilmington Highway to meet up with US 17 along the freeway bypass of Jacksonville that also carries NC 24 and leads to Marine Corps Base Camp Lejeune. US 258 and NC 24 Business run concurrently along Richlands Highway, a five-lane road with center turn lane, west to the western terminus of the freeway, a four-way intersection at which NC 24 begins to run concurrently with US 258; the west leg of the intersection is NC 53 (Burgaw Highway). The U.S. Highway and state highway parallel the New River through a junction with the southern end of NC 111 (Catherine Lake Road) to just south of Richlands, where the highways cross the river and pass through that town. The highways head west out of the town as Kinston Highway. West of Richlands NC 24 continues west as five-lane Beulaville Highway toward Beulaville while US 258 curves north along Kinston Highway, which reduces to two lanes.

US 258 briefly passes through Jones County, where the highway intersects NC 41 at Hargetts Crossroads before entering Lenoir County. The U.S. Highway crosses the Trent River and passes through Woodington prior to its junction with US 70 and NC 58 (New Bern Road) just south of the Neuse River in Kinston. The roadway continues straight as Queen Street, which carries NC 58, US 70 Business, and US 258 Business across the river into downtown Kinston. US 258 runs concurrently northwest along the US 70 four-lane divided highway; the two U.S. Highways have an intersection with NC 11 and NC 55 (Old Pink Hill Road) before crossing the river and meeting the other end of the highways' business routes, which follow Vernon Avenue. US 258 and US 70 follow Vernon Avenue a short distance west to where US 258 turns north. The U.S. Highway has an at-grade crossing with the North Carolina Railroad and meets the western end of NC 148 (C.F. Harvey Parkway), which serves Kinston Regional Jetport and the North Carolina Global TransPark.

=== Kinston to Tarboro ===
US 258 crosses Wheat Swamp into Greene County. The U.S. Highway intersects NC 58 (Kingold Boulevard) again south of Snow Hill, which the highway enters along 2nd Street. In the center of town, US 258 turns onto Greene Street and crosses Contentnea Creek, then has a four-way intersection with US 13, NC 91, and NC 903. The roadway continues north as NC 91; US 258 begins to run northeast concurrently with US 13 and NC 903. NC 903 diverges from the two U.S. Highways west of Maury; the U.S. Highways intersect NC 123 in the hamlet of Lizzie. US 258 and US 13 diverge north of Sandy Run. US 258 crosses Middle Swamp into Pitt County and intersects US 264 Alternate south of Farmville. US 258 and US 264 Alternate briefly run together east for zero point two miles (0.32 km) before US 258 heads north again. US 258 comes to a diamond interchange with I-587 and US 264 (John P. East Memorial Highway) and Wesley Chapel Road northeast of the center of Farmville. US 258 joins the I-587 and US 264 freeway west for about three miles (4.8 km) before exiting at another diamond interchange northwest of town. The former routing of the highway through Farmville is now U.S. Route 258 Business.

US 258 intersects NC 222 (Wilson Street) in Fountain before entering Edgecombe County. The U.S. Highway intersects NC 124 in Crisp and NC 42 and NC 43 east of Pinetops, then parallels the Tar River to Tarboro. South of downtown Tarboro, the U.S. Highway has a partial cloverleaf interchange with the US 64 freeway and Western Boulevard, which features US 64 Alternate, NC 111, and NC 122. US 258 and the two state highways cross the Tar River on the freeway, then exit US 64 onto Mutual Boulevard at a partial interchange on the east side of the river in Princeville. There is no access from southbound US 258 to eastbound US 64 or from westbound US 64 to northbound US 258. The missing movements are provided via NC 33, which the three highways intersect in the center of town. A short distance to the east, NC 111 diverges on Greenwood Boulevard. US 258 and NC 122 parallel the river north before the two routes diverge northeast of Tarboro.

=== Tarboro to Franklin ===
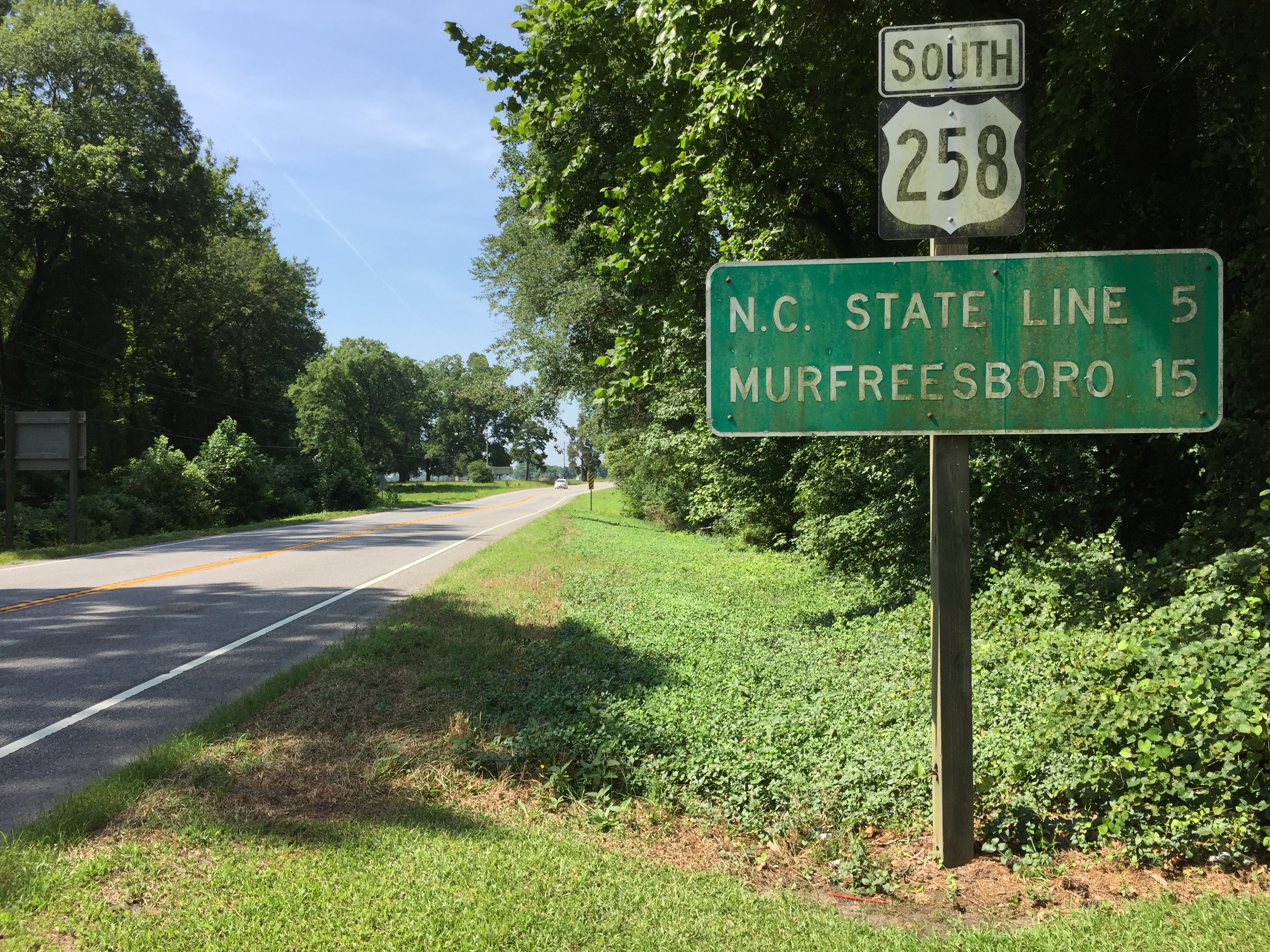
View south along US 258 at SR 189 in Southampton County, Virginia

US 258 intersects NC 97 in the hamlet of Lawrence before the highway enters Halifax County. The U.S. Highway crosses Deep Creek before becoming the Main Street of Scotland Neck. US 258 becomes concurrent with NC 125 at the south edge of the town and with NC 903, which enters from the east on 9th Street, in the center of town. NC 125 and NC 903 exit town to the west on 12th Street. US 258 has a junction with NC 561 north of Scotland Neck; the two highways cross the Roanoke River into Northampton County. The two highways meet the northern end of NC 308 just before entering Rich Square as Main Street. In the center of Rich Square, US 258 intersects NC 305 (Jackson Street), which exits town to the east with NC 561. The U.S. Highway has an at-grade crossing of the North Carolina and Virginia Railroad southwest of Woodland, where the highway, marked as Main Street, has a concurrency with NC 35 between Spruce Street and Linden Street.

North of Woodland, US 258 crosses Potecasi Creek and parallels the Northampton–Hertford county line north to Murfreesboro. The U.S. Highway joins US 158 east into Hertford County on its four-lane divided southern bypass of the town while the roadway continues straight as US 158 Business (Main Street). Southeast of the town, US 258 leaves US 158 and joins NC 11 on Beechwood Boulevard, which the two highways follow to NC 11's northern terminus at US 158 Business. US 258 leaves Murfreesboro on Virginia Boulevard, which crosses the Meherrin River and heads northeast through Como to the state line, where the highway enters Southampton County, Virginia. The U.S. Highway, now named Smiths Ferry Road, uses the General Vaughan Bridge to cross the Nottoway River a short distance north of its confluence with the Blackwater River to form the Chowan River.

US 258 meets the western end of SR 189 (Quay Road) before reaching its diamond interchange with US 58 (Southampton Parkway) south of the independent city of Franklin. US 258 joins US 58 on a four-lane freeway heading east while the roadway continues north into the city as US 258 Business (South Street). US 258 and US 58 head southeast through a widely spaced partial cloverleaf interchange with SR 714 (Pretlow Street) before crossing the Blackwater River into the city of Suffolk. East of the river, the U.S. Highways have a partial cloverleaf interchange with SR 189, which joins US 58 heading east toward Norfolk while US 258 exits the freeway and heads north, becoming Great Mill Highway on entering Isle of Wight County southeast of Franklin. When Great Mill Highway continues north toward an industrial area on the east side of Franklin, US 258 veers northeast on Camp Family Highway, crosses over Norfolk Southern Railway's Franklin District, and meets the northern end of US 258 Business at its intersection with US 58 Business (Carrsville Highway) just north of its grade crossing of CSX's Portsmouth Subdivision rail line and just south of Franklin Municipal-John Beverly Rose Airport.

=== Franklin to Hampton ===
US 258 continues northeast as Walters Highway through the hamlet of Walters to the town of Windsor, where the highway is named Prince Boulevard, has a grade crossing of Norfolk Southern's Norfolk District rail line, and intersects US 460 (Windsor Boulevard). The U.S. Highway continues north as Courthouse Highway through the county seat of Isle of Wight to the town of Smithfield. US 258 enters the town as Main Street before joining SR 10 on the town's bypass; Main Street continues as US 258 Business. The two-lane bypass has a diamond interchange with Fairway Drive, then crosses Cypress Creek and collects the northern end of US 258 Business, which runs concurrently with SR 10 Business on Church Street. US 258 and SR 10 continue southeast on four-lane divided Benns Church Boulevard to Benns Church, where US 258 leaves SR 10 and joins SR 32 on Brewers Neck Boulevard. The U.S. Highway and state highway follow that boulevard to Carrollton, where the highways join US 17 on Carrollton Boulevard. The three highways curve northeast and cross the James River on the James River Bridge.

US 258, US 17, and SR 32 enter the city of Newport News on Mercury Boulevard. The six-lane highway has a partial cloverleaf interchange with US 60 (Warwick Boulevard) and crosses CSX's Peninsula Subdivision rail line before reaching SR 143 (Jefferson Avenue), where SR 32 has its northern terminus. US 17 turns north onto Jefferson Avenue while US 258 continues east on Mercury Boulevard into the city of Hampton. At Newmarket Drive south of the former Newmarket North Mall, the U.S. Highway expands to eight lanes and passes through a heavily commercialized area. East of SR 415 (Power Plant Parkway), US 258 meets Interstate 64 at an interchange featuring a pair of flyover ramps. The U.S. Highway heads east from the Interstate concurrent with SR 134 as the highway passes between Peninsula Town Center to the north and the Hampton Coliseum to the south. At the eastern end of the heavily commercialized area, US 258 has intersections with the eastern end of SR 152 (Cunningham Drive) and Armistead Avenue, which heads south as SR 134.

US 258 crosses Newmarket Creek just west of the highway's partial cloverleaf interchange with La Salle Avenue. The U.S. Highway reduces to six lanes at its diamond interchange with SR 278 (King Street), which serves Langley Air Force Base. US 258 becomes four lanes at its northern intersection with SR 169, which heads north as Fox Hill Road. The U.S. Highway crosses the Hampton River and curves south toward its terminus. US 258 intersects SR 351 (Pembroke Avenue) and Woodland Avenue, which leads to I-64 and downtown Hampton and where the highway reduces to a four-lane undivided street. The U.S. Highway has another junction with SR 169 (Mallory Street) in the Phoebus neighborhood of Hampton. At the east edge of Phoebus, US 258 crosses the Mill Creek estuary on a causeway and reaches its northern terminus at an intersection with the southern terminus of SR 143 (Ingalls Road) at the entrance to Fort Monroe. Ingalls Road continues south onto the former military base at Old Point Comfort that was decommissioned in September 2011.

== Major intersections ==
State	County	Location	mi	km	Destinations	Notes
North Carolina	Onslow	Jacksonville	0.00	0.00	US 17 Bus. / NC 24 Bus. east (Marine Boulevard/Wilmington Highway)	Southern terminus of US 258; south end of concurrency with NC 24 Business
North Carolina	Onslow	Jacksonville	1.11	1.79	NC 24 east to US 17 / NC 53 west (Burgaw Highway) – New Bern, Camp Lejeune, Wilmington, Burgaw	North end of concurrency with NC 24 Business; south end of concurrency with NC 24
North Carolina	Onslow		6.43	10.35	NC 111 north (Catherine Lake Road) – Chinquapin	Southern terminus of NC 111
North Carolina	Onslow	Richlands	16.26	26.17	NC 24 west (Beulaville Highway) – Beulaville	North end of concurrency with NC 24
North Carolina	Jones		23.30	37.50	NC 41 – Beulaville, Trenton	
North Carolina	Lenoir	Kinston	41.72	67.14	US 70 east (New Bern Road) / US 70 Bus. west / US 258 Bus. north / NC 58 (Queen Street) – New Bern, Trenton	South end of concurrency with US 70
North Carolina	Lenoir	Kinston	42.95	69.12	NC 11 / NC 55 (Old Pink Hill Road) – Kenansville, Mount Olive	
North Carolina	Lenoir	Kinston	44.98	72.39	US 70 Bus. east / US 258 Bus. south (Vernon Avenue)	
North Carolina	Lenoir	Kinston	45.47	73.18	US 70 west (Vernon Avenue) – Goldsboro	North end of concurrency with US 70
North Carolina	Lenoir	Kinston	48.88	78.66	NC 148 east (C.F. Harvey Parkway) – Kinston Regional Jetport	
North Carolina	Greene	Snow Hill	55.04	88.58	NC 58 (Kingold Boulevard) – Kinston, Stantonsburg	
North Carolina	Greene	Snow Hill	56.77	91.36	US 13 south / NC 91 north / NC 903 south – Goldsboro, Walstonburg, La Grange	South end of concurrency with US 13
North Carolina	Greene		59.10	95.11	NC 903 north – Maury	North end of concurrency with NC 903
North Carolina	Greene	Lizzie	61.10	98.33	NC 123 south – Maury	Northern terminus of NC 123
North Carolina	Greene		63.10	101.55	US 13 north – Greenville	North end of concurrency with US 13
North Carolina	Pitt	Farmville	66.82	107.54	US 264 west (Marlboro Road) / US 258 Bus. north (Main Street) – Wilson	South end of concurrency with US 264
North Carolina	Pitt				US 264 east – Greenville	North end of concurrency with US 264
North Carolina	Pitt	Farmville			I-587 east (John P. East Memorial Highway) / Wesley Church Road – Greenville	South end I-587 overlap, exit 66 (I-587)
North Carolina	Pitt	Farmville			I-587 west (John P. East Memorial Highway) / US 258 Bus. south – Wilson	North end of I-587 overlap, exit 63 (I-587)
North Carolina	Pitt	Fountain	74.32	119.61	NC 222 (Wilson Street) – Falkland, Saratoga	
North Carolina	Edgecombe	Crisp	78.92	127.01	NC 124 – Macclesfield, Conetoe	
North Carolina	Edgecombe		81.42	131.03	NC 42 / NC 43 – Pinetops, Falkland, Conetoe	
North Carolina	Edgecombe	Tarboro	89.62	144.23	US 64 west / US 64 Alt. west / NC 111 south / NC 122 south (Western Boulevard) – Rocky Mount, Pinetops	US 64 Exit 485; south end of concurrency with US 64, NC 111, and NC 122
North Carolina	Edgecombe	Princeville	90.31	145.34	US 64 east – Williamston	US 64 Exit 486; no access from westbound US 64 to northbound US 258 or from southbound US 258 to eastbound US 64; north end of concurrency with US 64
North Carolina	Edgecombe	Princeville	90.73	146.02	NC 33 – Tarboro, Belvoir	
North Carolina	Edgecombe	Princeville	91.12	146.64	NC 111 north (Greenwood Boulevard) – Oak City	North end of concurrency with NC 111
North Carolina	Edgecombe		94.55	152.16	NC 122 north – Speed	North end of concurrency with NC 122
North Carolina	Edgecombe		101.05	162.62	NC 97 – Leggett, Hobgood	
North Carolina	Halifax	Scotland Neck	109.52	176.26	NC 125 south – Hobgood	South end of concurrency with NC 125
North Carolina	Halifax	Scotland Neck	109.98	177.00	NC 903 south (9th Street) – Hamilton	South end of concurrency with NC 903
North Carolina	Halifax	Scotland Neck	110.25	177.43	NC 125 north / NC 903 north (12th Street) – Halifax	North end of concurrency with NC 125 and NC 903
North Carolina	Halifax		114.74	184.66	NC 561 west – Halifax	South end of concurrency with NC 561
North Carolina	Northampton	Rich Square	121.86	196.11	NC 308 south – Kelford	
North Carolina	Northampton	Rich Square	123.39	198.58	NC 305 / NC 561 east (Jackson Street) – Jackson, Aulander, Ahoskie	North end of concurrency with NC 561
North Carolina	Northampton	Woodland	129.32	208.12	NC 35 south (Spruce Street) – Aulander	South end of concurrency with NC 35
North Carolina	Northampton	Woodland	129.49	208.39	NC 35 north (Linden Street) – Conway	North end of concurrency with NC 35
North Carolina	Northampton		137.94	221.99	US 158 west / US 158 Bus. east (Main Street) – Conway, Murfreesboro	South end of concurrency with US 158
North Carolina	Hertford	Murfreesboro	140.62	226.31	US 158 east / NC 11 south – Winton, Ahoskie	North end of concurrency with US 158; south end of concurrency with NC 11
North Carolina	Hertford	Murfreesboro	142.04	228.59	US 158 Bus. (Main Street) / NC 11 ends – Elizabeth City	Northern terminus of NC 11
			151.98 0.00	244.59 0.00	North Carolina – Virginia state line	
Virginia	Southampton		5.28	8.50	SR 189 north (South Quay Road) – Holland, Norfolk	
Virginia	Southampton		9.00	14.48	US 58 west / US 258 Bus. north (South Street) – Franklin, Courtland, Emporia	Diamond interchange; south end of concurrency with US 58
Virginia	Southampton				SR 714 (Pretlow Street)	Partial cloverleaf interchange; former SR 189
Virginia	City of Suffolk		13.29	21.39	US 58 east / SR 189 – Suffolk, Norfolk	Partial cloverleaf interchange; north end of concurrency with US 58
Virginia	Isle of Wight		17.07	27.47	US 58 Bus. / US 258 Bus. south (Carrsville Highway) – Franklin, Suffolk, Franklin Historic District	
Virginia	Isle of Wight	Windsor	29.90	48.12	US 460 (West Windsor Boulevard) – Petersburg, Suffolk	
Virginia	Isle of Wight	Smithfield	44.35	71.37	SR 10 west / US 258 Bus. north (Main Street) – Smithfield, Richmond, Smithfield Historic District, Isle of Wight County Museum	South end of concurrency with SR 10
Virginia	Isle of Wight	Smithfield			SR 710 south (Fairway Drive)	Diamond interchange
Virginia	Isle of Wight	Smithfield	46.65	75.08	US 258 Bus. south / SR 10 Bus. west (South Church Street) – Smithfield, Smithfield Center	
Virginia	Isle of Wight	Benns Church	48.61	78.23	SR 10 east / SR 32 south (Benns Church Boulevard) – Suffolk	North end of concurrency with SR 10; south end of concurrency with SR 32
Virginia	Isle of Wight	Bartlett	51.46	82.82	US 17 south (Carrollton Boulevard) – Portsmouth	South end of concurrency with US 17
Virginia	James River		53.63– 58.27	86.31– 93.78	James River Bridge	
Virginia	City of Newport News		58.49	94.13	US 60 (Warwick Boulevard) – Fort Eustis, Downtown Newport News	Partial cloverleaf interchange
Virginia	City of Newport News		59.05	95.03	US 17 north / SR 143 (Jefferson Avenue) – Williamsburg, Newport News Marine Terminal	North end of concurrency with US 17; northern terminus of SR 32
Virginia	City of Hampton		61.83	99.51	SR 415 east (Power Plant Parkway)	
Virginia	City of Hampton		62.17	100.05	I-64 / SR 134 north – Williamsburg, Richmond, Norfolk, Virginia Beach	I-64 exit 263; south end of concurrency with SR 134
Virginia	City of Hampton		63.00	101.39	SR 152 south (Cunningham Drive)	
Virginia	City of Hampton		63.24	101.77	SR 134 south (North Armistead Avenue) – Coliseum, Convention Center	North end of concurrency with SR 134
Virginia	City of Hampton		63.87	102.79	To I-64 / LaSalle Avenue – LAFB	Partial cloverleaf interchange; former SR 167
Virginia	City of Hampton		64.76	104.22	SR 278 north (North King Street)	Diamond interchange
Virginia	City of Hampton				SR 169 south (Fox Hill Road)	
Virginia	City of Hampton		66.43	106.91	SR 351 (East Pembroke Avenue)	
Virginia	City of Hampton				SR 143 Truck west (Woodland Road) to I-64	south end of SR 143 Truck overlap
Virginia	City of Hampton		67.37	108.42	SR 169 (North Mallory Street) to I-64 – Buckroe Beach	
Virginia	City of Hampton		68.17	109.71	SR 143 west (East Mellen Street) to I-64	north end of SR 143 Truck overlap
1.000 mi = 1.609 km; 1.000 km = 0.621 mi: Concurrency terminus; Incomplete access

== Special routes ==
- U.S. Route 258 Business (Kinston, North Carolina)
- U.S. Route 258 Truck (Snow Hill, North Carolina)
- U.S. Route 258 Business (Farmville, North Carolina)
- U.S. Route 258 Business (Franklin, Virginia)
- U.S. Route 258 Business (Smithfield, Virginia)
- U.S. Route 258 Alternate (Smithfield, Virginia)

Browse numbered routes
< SR 107	Spurs of SR 10; 1923–1928	SR 109 >
< SR 506	District 5 State Routes; 1928–1933	SR 508 >
