= Josiah Ogden Watson =

American politician (1784–2852)

Josiah Ogden Watson

Josiah Ogden Watson (24 September 1784 – 12 June 1852) was an American Plantation owner, medical doctor, and statesman from North Carolina. He was the son of John Watson, a Revolutionary War veteran, and Elizabeth (née Ogden) and born at Pineville plantation in Johnston County, NC.

== Physician ==
Josiah Watson studied medicine under Dr. Henry Haywood (d. 1812) in Tarboro, NC, from about 1800–1805. About 1807, he migrated to Georgetown County, SC, and developed a lucrative medical practice, becoming close friends with South Carolina Governor Joseph Alston's family in the area. In 1811, he matriculated at the University of Pennsylvania medical department for one year. Returning to South Carolina, he continued practicing medicine and was a parishioner at All Saints Church on Pawleys Island, representing the parish at an Episcopal convention in Charleston, SC, in 1813.

== War of 1812 service ==
Dr. Watson served as a Hospital Surgeon during the War of 1812 in Brigadier General Joseph Graham's Brigade of the North Carolina and South Carolina militia. He was on command in the Creek Nation at the defeat of the Red Stick Creeks by General Andrew Jackson at the Battle of Horseshoe Bend on 27 March 1814. It is said that he remained personal friends with Andrew Jackson after the war, and Watson was an original contributor to the equestrian statue of Andrew Jackson in Lafayette Square, Washington, D.C., designed by Clark Mills and erected in 1853.

== Plantation Owner ==
After the War of 1812, Josiah O. Watson and his brother John Brown Watson inherited their father's plantation in Johnston County on the Neuse River in 1815. He bought his brother's portion and accumulated many plantations during his life. When he died in 1852, he owned approximately 10,000 acres (40 km^{2}) of land in Johnston and Wake Counties. The main plantation was called Pineville and was located across the Neuse River from Clayton, NC, where North Carolina Highway 42 intersects Buffalo Road.

After his death, most of the plantation was inherited by his nephew J. W. B. Watson, whom he had raised after the young boy was orphaned; Dr. Watson's brother William and his wife were reportedly killed by one of his slaves while traveling to Alabama. As of 1857, J. W. B. enslaved at least 135 people on the plantation, some of whom were buried in a small cemetery just north of the current intersection of Highway 42 and Buffalo Road. In May 1861, J.W.B., a State Senator, joined a unanimous vote to have North Carolina secede from the United States. When the younger Watson died in 1897, much of the land was divided among many heirs and the main plantation and house was eventually sold to the Percy Flowers family.

Dr. Josiah Watson also owned smaller plantations below Smithfield, NC, on the Neuse River called the Islands. He bequeathed these properties and their enslaved inhabitants to his nephews William H. Watson, George W. Watson, and Henry Bulls Watson, the last of whom is recorded as having held 42 people in bondage, including a high proportion of women and children. Dr. Watson also owned land and plantations in Lawrence County, Alabama, and Courtland, AL, that were managed by his brother John Brown Watson.

Currently, much of the land is being developed into a residential community called Flowers Plantation. The Dr. Watson Inn, a bed and breakfast that is part of Flowers Plantation, sits on the original site of the manor house and has some of the original wood framework.

== Family ==
Josiah Watson married Penninah Tartt of Edgecombe County, NC, on 6 December 1818. She was the daughter of Elnathan Tartt and Obedience Thomas. Their only child was a daughter Elizabeth Obedience Watson who was born 24 September 1819 and died 3 December 1839 in Wilmington, NC, on the way to Cuba for treatment of respiratory distress. Penninah Tartt Watson died 30 January 1848 at their home Sharon near Raleigh.

== Statesman ==
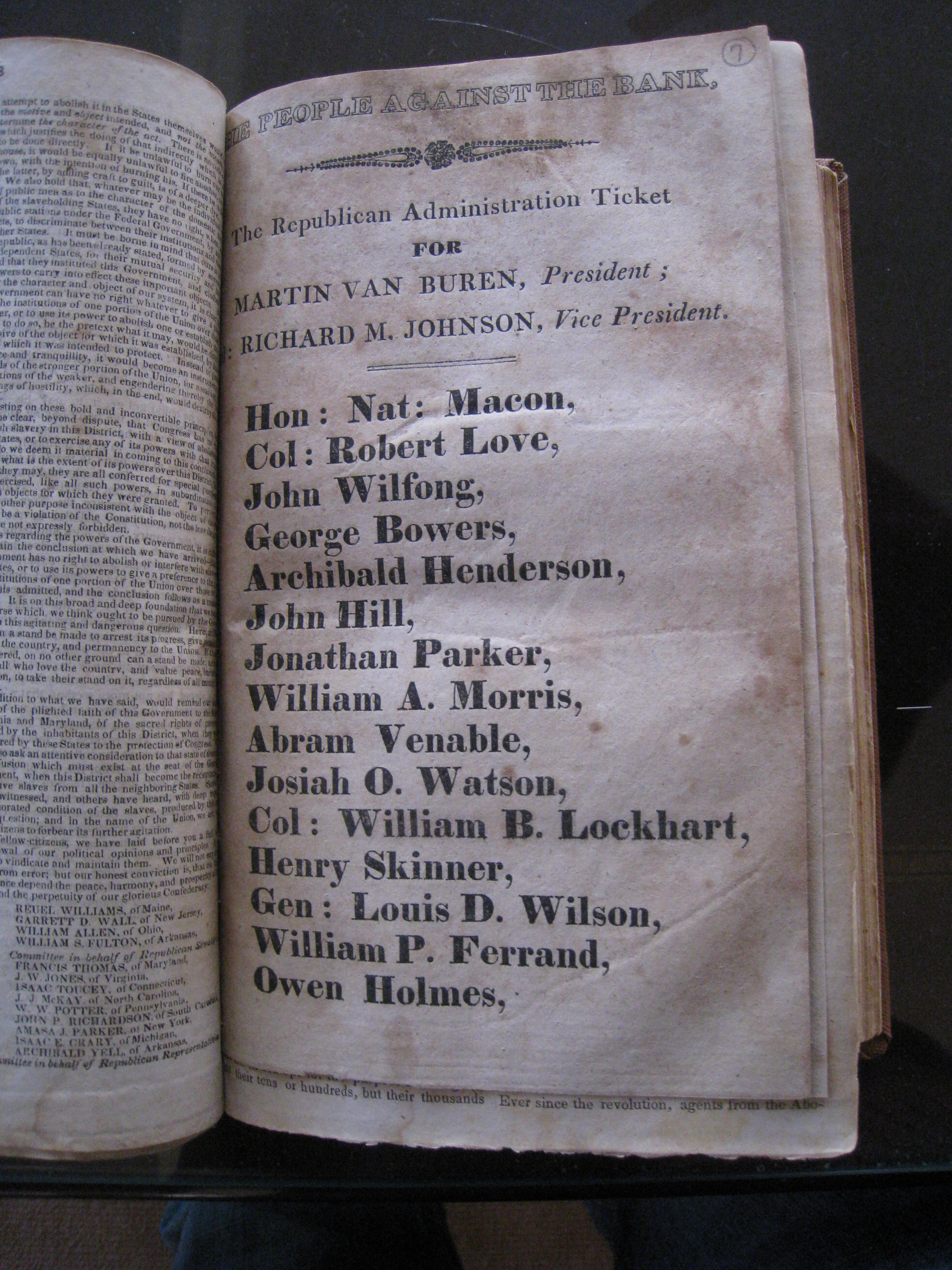
1836 Campaign Pamphlet for Van Buren

J. O. Watson served for many years on the Johnston County Court of Pleas and Quarter Sessions as a Justice of Peace. He was elected to the 1828 North Carolina House of Commons representing Johnston County and served on the Committee of Education. He was a member of the Democratic Party and was a delegate to the Democratic National Conventions in 1835, 1844, and 1848. He ran on the presidential electoral ticket in 1832, 1836, and 1840 and was a member of the Electoral College in 1832, casting his vote for President Andrew Jackson, and in 1836, casting his vote for President Martin Van Buren. Josiah O. Watson ran unsuccessfully in 1841 for the 27th Congress of the United States House of Representatives, representing the 4th District of North Carolina.

== Estate near Raleigh ==
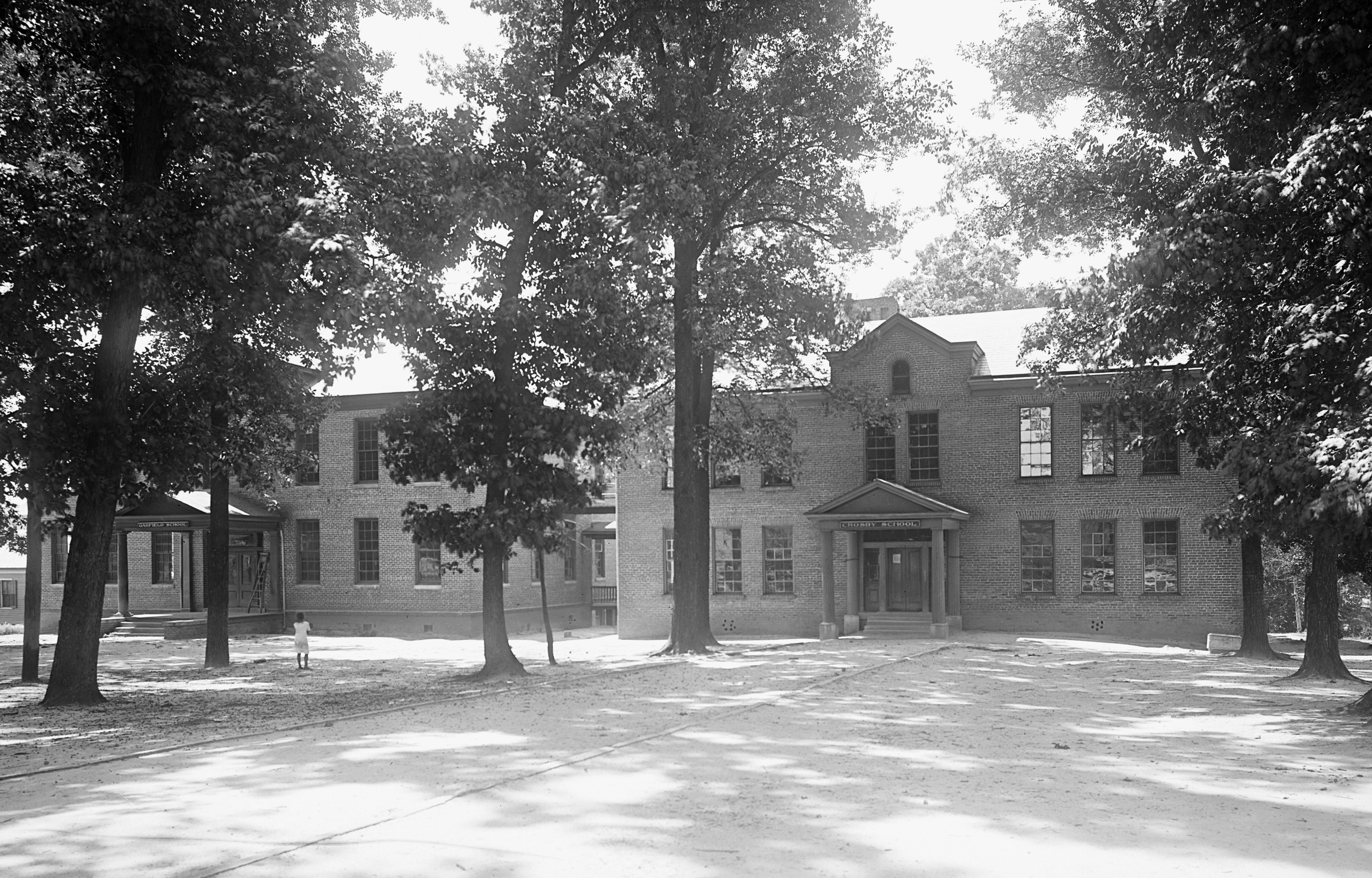
Crosby School in old Watson-Worth Mansion

In 1836, Josiah Watson purchased approximately 600 acres (2.4 km^{2}) of land just outside the city of Raleigh, NC, in Wake County from John Sugg. The mansion on the estate had been built about 1805 by Heny Potter and named Sharon before he sold the estate in 1822. The estate covered an area from the original 1792 city limit southeast of Raleigh east to the rock quarry and south across Walnut Creek. After Josiah's death, the main house on East Lenoir Street was sold to State Treasurer Jonathan Worth before he became governor and is also known as the Watson-Worth House. It was later bought by Josiah's nephew J. W. B. Watson and after his death sold to the city of Raleigh to be transformed into the Crosby School for Negroes in 1897. The house was torn down about 1936, and the Crosby-Garfield School now occupies the site. Much of the land is still used for parks, public schools and community centers. One part of the estate was developed into a residential community in the early 20th century and named "Watson Addition."

== Dorothea Dix Hospital ==
In 1849, Josiah O. Watson was appointed by the North Carolina General Assembly to a commission of six men to select a site and oversee the construction of the Insane Asylum of North Carolina, later known as the Dorothea Dix Hospital. The other men were Governor John Motley Morehead, Senator Calvin Graves, Dr. Thomas N. Cameron, George W. Mordecai, and Major Charles L. Hinton. The Insane Asylum is located on Dix Hill in Raleigh, NC, and was opened in 1856.

== North Carolina Railroad ==
In 1849, Dr. Watson was a strong proponent of the North Carolina Central Rail Road. He individually subscribed $10,000 of stock in the North Carolina Railroad and owned 40 shares of company stock at his death. Construction began in 1851 and was completed in 1856.

== Businessman ==
J. O. Watson was involved in several businesses including the Neuse Manufacturing Company, the North Carolina Mutual (Fire) Insurance Company, and the North Carolina Mutual Life Insurance Company. Josiah was also postmaster of Pineville post-office in Johnston County during the 1830s and 1840s.

== Christ Church and Ravenscroft School ==
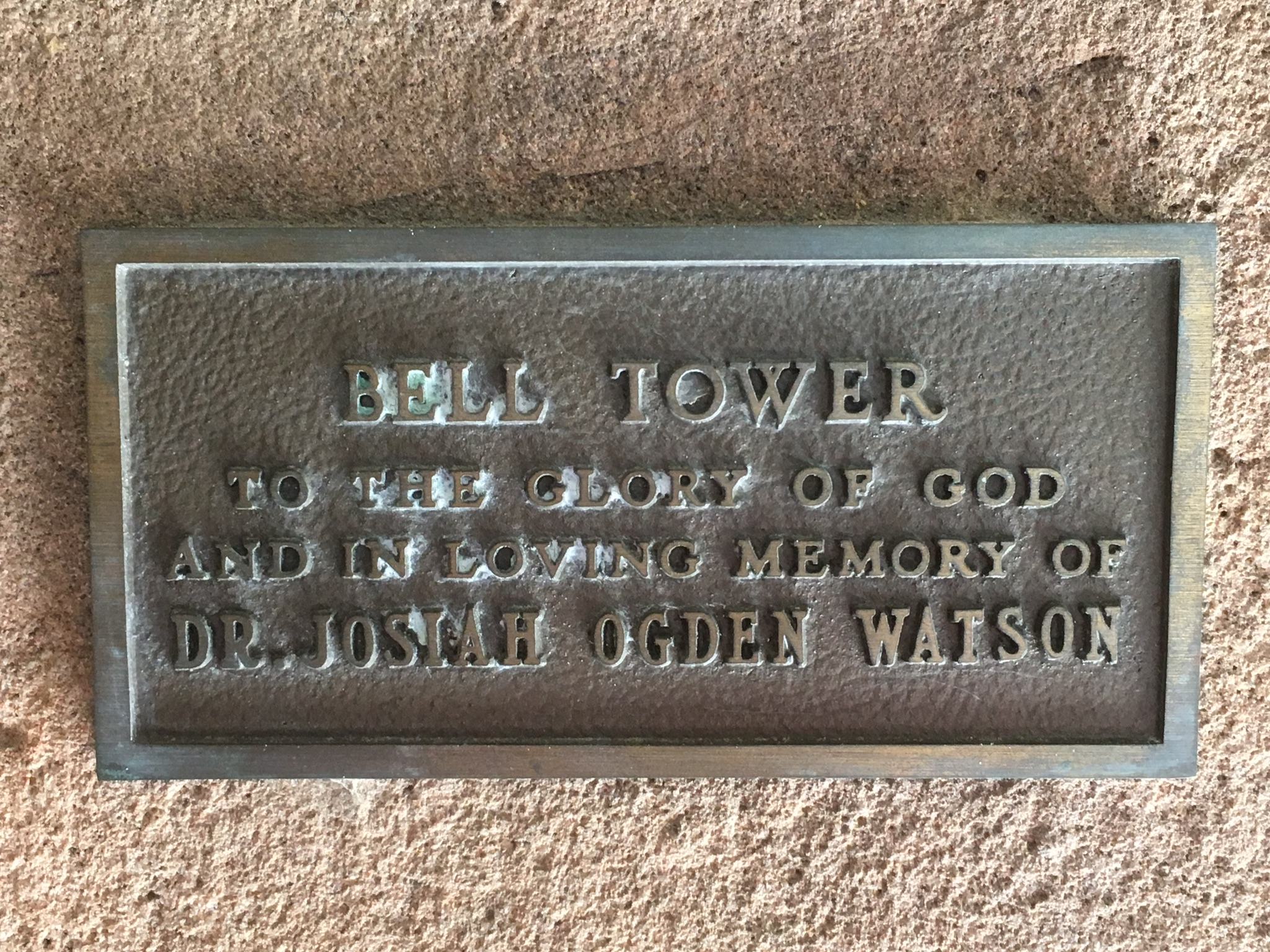
Plaque on the Bell Tower of Christ Church

Dr. Watson was a parishioner at Christ Episcopal Church, and was baptized there on 12 January 1840. He represented the church as a lay delegate at many annual conventions of the Episcopal Church of North Carolina. In 1851, he purchased 5 pews to support the completion of the interior of the new church. In his will, he bequeathed $2500 (~$68,344 in 2024) to be used to finish the tower and steeple of the church, which was completed in 1861. He also gave the church $5000 to be used to fund and employ a teacher for a parish school. A small school was established in 1868, but, in 1937, the Ravenscroft School was organized using the original funds directed by Dr. Watson.

== Death and burial ==
The Watson Mausoleum in Old City Cemetery

Josiah Ogden Watson died at his Raleigh estate Sharon on 12 June 1852. He is buried in Old City Cemetery in Raleigh in the Watson vault with his wife, daughter, and nephew J. W. B. Watson.
