= North Carolina Highway 903 =

State highway in North Carolina, US

North Carolina Highway 903

- Route of NC 903 in eastern North Carolina highlighted in red

Route information
- Maintained by NCDOT
- Length: 200 mi (320 km)
- Existed: 1934–present

Major junctions
- South end: NC 411 near Garland
- US 421 in Delway; I-40 / NC 24 near Magnolia; US 70 near La Grange; US 13 / US 258 near Snow Hill; US 264 near Greenville; US 13 / US 64 near Robersonville; US 258 / NC 125 in Scotland Neck; US 301 in Halifax; I-95 near Weldon; US 158 / NC 4 in Littleton
- North end: SR 903 at the Virginia state line near Ebony, VA

Location
- Country: United States
- State: North Carolina
- Counties: Sampson, Duplin, Lenoir, Greene, Pitt, Martin, Halifax, Warren

Highway system
- North Carolina Highway System; Interstate; US; State; Scenic
← NC 902	→ NC 904

North Carolina Highway 903 (NC 903) is a primary state highway in the U.S. state of North Carolina. It serves predominantly as a rural highway in the Inner Banks region and arterial road in and around Greenville. The road covers a total of 200 miles (320 km), in a zigzag pattern through the state. At exactly 200 miles in length, NC 903 is the fourth longest primary state highway.

== Route description ==
NC 903 begins at an intersection with NC 411 east of Garland; where it proceeds to first go north, crossing the Black River, and then east through Delway and Magnolia. Northeast of Magnolia, NC 903 connects with I-40 at its exit 373 and begin its first concurrency with NC 24 (one of many concurrences along its route). Traveling along the Kenansville Bypass, a rural expressway, it completely bypasses the city of Kenansville. Reverting to a two-lane rural highway and switching to a concurrency with NC 11 and later NC 111, it continues north, crossing the Neuse River, to US 70 in La Grange. Continuing north, it reaches Snow Hill where it overlaps briefly with NC 58 and with US 13/US 258. Breaking away from the concurrences, it goes east to Maury and then northeast to Winterville, where it meets up with NC 11 again.

As NC 903 enters Greenville, the biggest city along its route, it stays completely on Memorial Drive as various highway routes connect on then off it: NC 43, from Greenville Boulevard to Fifth Street; US 13, joins at Dickinson Avenue; and NC 33, from Greene Street to Belvoir Highway. Halfway through the city, it crosses the Tar River. After passing US 264 in the north Greenville area, NC 903 splits northeasterly from US 13/NC 11 to Stokes and then north to Robersonville which is the first original section of the route. After connecting with US 13 (third and final time) and US 64, NC 903 goes north and merges with NC 125 and travels to Hamilton. Now going in a northwesterly direction, it splits and then reconnects with NC 125 in Scotland Neck, overlapping briefly with US 258 in town. The NC 903/NC 125 concurrency continues to US 301 in Halifax where it finally splits going west towards I-95 and then to US 158, bypassing Roanoke Rapids. Sharing one last concurrency with US 158, it breaks north at Lttleton, going through the Lake Gaston area by first crossing the Roanoke River, travels through the community of Elams, then swings west over Songbird Creek and then finally north into Virginia, where it downgrades to secondary state road 903.

== History ==
NC 903 was established in 1934 as a new primary routing that connected Stokes between NC 11 and US 64; the initial route length was 15.6 miles (25.1 km). In 1938, NC 903 was extended north on new routing from US 64 to NC 125. In 1967 or 1968, NC 903 was extended north, overlapping with NC 125 to Hamilton, then on new primary routing to US 258/NC 125 in Scotland Neck.

Around 1972, NC 903 extended northwest along NC 125 to Halifax, then west on new primary routing to I-95. Between 1976 and 1978, NC 903 made its first extension south, with an overlap with NC 11 through Greenville and Winterville, then replaced NC 91 south to US 70 in La Grange.

Between 1980 and 1982, NC 903 was extended west, from I-95, on new primary routing to US 158; it then made its final north extension, between 1984 and 1990, by overlapping US 158 to Littleton and then through the Lake Gaston area to the Virginia state line, south of Ebony. Also during the late 1980s, NC 903 was extended south on new routing from La Grange to Albertson, then share concurrences with NC 111 and NC 11 to Kenansville, and again new primary routing connecting I-40 and to end at US 117 in Magnolia.

In 1994 or 1995, NC 903 was extended southwest to its current southern terminus with NC 411 east of Garland. In 2002, NC 903 was moved onto the Kenansville Bypass.

== Junction list ==
County	Location	mi	km	Destinations	Notes
Sampson		0.0	0.0	NC 411 – Garland, Harrells	Southern terminus
Sampson		7.1	11.4	US 421 – Wilmington, Clinton	
Duplin	Magnolia	18.9	30.4	US 117 (Monk Street) – Rose Hill, Warsaw	
Duplin		21.2	34.1	I-40 / NC 24 west – Wilmington, Benson	West end of NC 24 overlap
Duplin		24.0	38.6	NC 11 – Greenevers, Kenansville	To James Sprunt Community College
Duplin		26.1	42.0	NC 50 – Chinquapin, Kenansville	
Duplin		27.0	43.5	NC 24 east / NC 24 Bus. west – Beulaville, Jacksonville, Kenansville	East end of NC 24 overlap
Duplin		28.1	45.2	NC 11 south – Kenansville	South end of NC 11 overlap
Duplin	Kornegay	37.3	60.0	NC 11 north / NC 111 south – Beulaville	North end of NC 11 and south end of NC 111 overlap
Duplin	Albertson	41.5	66.8	NC 111 north – Goldsboro	North end of NC 111 overlap
Lenoir	Husseys Crossroads	48.6	78.2	NC 55 – Kinston, Seven Springs, Mount Olive	
Lenoir	La Grange	55.5	89.3	US 70 – Kinston, Goldsboro	
Greene	Snow Hill	69.4	111.7	NC 58 south (Kingold Boulevard) – Kinston	South end of NC 58 overlap
Greene	Snow Hill	69.7	112.2	US 13 south / NC 58 north (Kingold Boulevard) – Wilson, Goldsboro	South end of US 13 and north end of NC 58 overlap
Greene		70.9	114.1	US 258 south / NC 91 north (Kingold Boulevard) – Snow Hill, Walstonburg	South end of US 258 overlap
Greene		73.2	117.8	US 13 / US 258 north – Farmville	North end of US 13/US 258 overlap
Greene	Maury	76.5	123.1	NC 123 – Hookerton, Farmville	
Pitt		83.7	134.7	NC 102 east – Ayden	Western terminus of NC 102
Pitt	Winterville	90.3	145.3	NC 11 south (Winterville Parkway) – Kinston	South end of NC 11 overlap
Pitt	Greenville	93.4	150.3	US 264 Alt. / NC 43 south (Greenville Boulevard) – Washington, Wilson	South end of NC 43 overlap
Pitt	Greenville	95.4	153.5	US 13 south (Dickinson Avenue) – Washington, Wilson	South end of US 13 overlap
Pitt	Greenville	96.4	155.1	NC 43 north (Fifth Street) – Rocky Mount	North end of NC 43 overlap
Pitt	Greenville	99.2	159.6	NC 33 east (Greene Street) – Rocky Mount	East end of NC 33 overlap
Pitt	Greenville	99.6	160.3	NC 33 west (Belvoir Highway) – Tarboro	West end of NC 33 overlap
Pitt	Greenville	100.0	160.9	US 264 / NC 11 Byp. south – Washington, Wilson	
Pitt	Greenville	100.7	162.1	US 13 (Belvoir Highway) / NC 11 north – Bethel, Williamston	North end of US 13/NC 11 overlap
Pitt	Stokes	107.2	172.5	NC 30 – Washington, Bethel	
Martin	Robersonville	116.3	187.2	US 64 Alt. – Williamston, Bethel	
Martin		117.1	188.5	US 13 / US 64 – Williamston, Tarboro	
Martin		122.9	197.8	NC 125 south – Williamston	South end of NC 125 overlap
Martin		124.1	199.7	NC 142 west – Hassell	Eastern terminus of NC 142
Martin	Hamilton	126.8	204.1	NC 125 north – Oak City	North end of NC 125 overlap
Martin		130.6	210.2	NC 11 north / NC 42 east – Lewiston-Woodville	South end of NC 11/NC 42 overlap
Martin		130.7	210.3	NC 11 south / NC 42 west – Oak City	North end of NC 11/NC 42 overlap
Halifax	Scotland Neck	145.5	234.2	US 258 / NC 125 south (Main Street) – Tarboro	South end of US 258/NC 125 overlap
Halifax	Scotland Neck	145.8	234.6	US 258 north (Main Street) – Rich Square	North end of US 258 overlap
Halifax		156.0	251.1	NC 481 – Tillery, Enfield	
Halifax		160.4	258.1	US 301 south – Enfield, Rocky Mount	South end of US 301 overlap
Halifax		162.5	261.5	NC 561 east – Tillery	East end of NC 561 overlap
Halifax		162.9	262.2	NC 561 west – Brinkleyville, Louisburg	West end of NC 561 overlap
Halifax	Halifax	163.3	262.8	US 301 Bus. (King Street)	
Halifax	Halifax	164.0	263.9	US 301 north – Weldon	North end of US 301 overlap
Halifax		164.5	264.7	NC 125 north – Roanoke Rapids	North end of US 125 overlap
Halifax		169.0	272.0	I-95 – Roanoke Rapids, Rocky Mount	Exit 168 (I-95)
Halifax		174.1	280.2	NC 48 – Roanoke Rapids, Brinkleyville	
Halifax		179.6	289.0	US 158 east – Roanoke Rapids	East end of US 158 overlap
Halifax	Littleton	186.2	299.7	US 158 west / NC 4 south – Warrenton, Brinkleyville	West end of US 158 overlap
Warren		200.0	321.9	SR 903 – Ebony	Northern terminus; Virginia state line
1.000 mi = 1.609 km; 1.000 km = 0.621 mi: Concurrency terminus

== See also ==
- North Carolina Bicycle Route 4-Concurrent with NC 903 from Eaton Ferry Road to River Road near Lake Gaston
- North Carolina Bicycle Route 7-Concurrent with NC 903 from Jenny Lind Road to Rag Road near La Grange
