= North Carolina Highway 142 =

State highway in North Carolina, US

North Carolina Highway 142

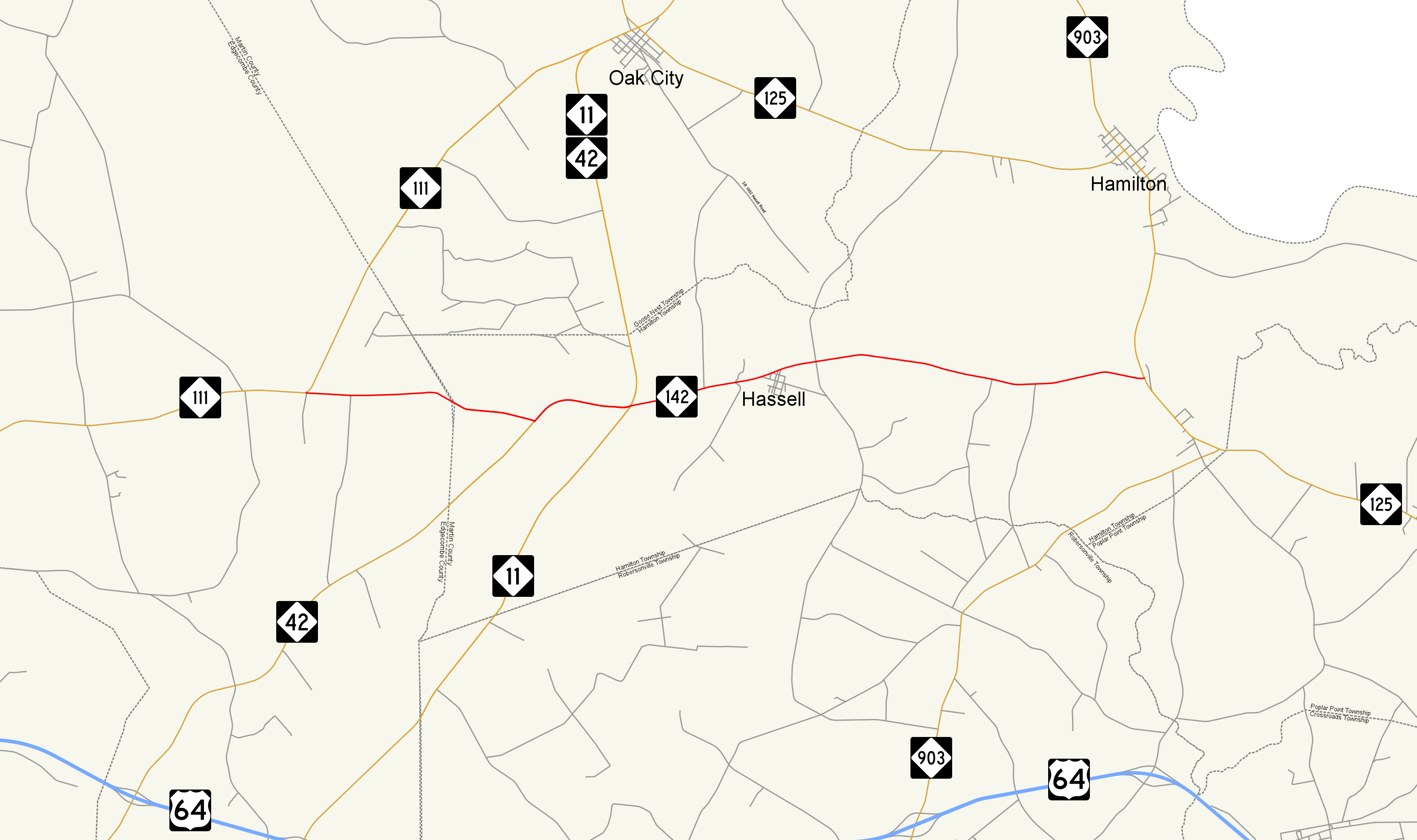

Route information
- Auxiliary route of NC 42
- Maintained by NCDOT
- Length: 9.2 mi (14.8 km)
- Existed: 1975–present
- Tourist routes: Tar Heel Trace

Major junctions
- West end: NC 111 in Fountain Fork
- NC 42 near Hassell; NC 11 near Hassell
- East end: NC 125 / NC 903 near Hamilton

Location
- Country: United States
- State: North Carolina
- Counties: Edgecombe, Martin

Highway system
- North Carolina Highway System; Interstate; US; State; Scenic
← NC 141	→ NC 143

North Carolina Highway 142 (NC 142) is a primary state highway in the U.S. state of North Carolina that goes through the town of Hassell. The entire route is two lanes wide.

== Route description ==
The western terminus of the highway is NC 111. Traveling east 2.5-mile (4.0 km), the highway beings a brief 1.1-mile (1.8 km) concurrency with NC 42 and joins the Tar Heel Trace scenic byway. NC 42 departs the route at the NC 11 intersection, NC 142 continues 1.4-mile (2.3 km) to the rural community of Hassell. Leaving Hassell to the east, NC 142 terminates after 3.7-mile (6.0 km) with the NC 125/NC 903 junction. The Tar Heel Trace continues southbound on NC 125.

== History ==
The route was created in 1975 as part of a rerouting of NC 42, which formerly ran from the current NC 11/NC 42/NC 142 junction to the NC 125/NC 903 junction. In 1980 the route was expanded west to its current profile by promoting two secondary routes in Edgecombe and Martin County.

== Junction list ==
County	Location	mi	km	Destinations	Notes
Edgecombe	Fountain Fork	0.0	0.0	NC 111 – Princeville, Oak City	Western terminus
Martin		2.5	4.0	NC 42 – Wilson, Oak City	West end of NC 42 concurrency
Martin		3.6	5.8	NC 11 / NC 42 east – Greenville, Oak City	East end of NC 42 concurrency
Martin		9.2	14.8	NC 125 / NC 903 – Hamilton, Williamston	Eastern terminus
1.000 mi = 1.609 km; 1.000 km = 0.621 mi: Concurrency terminus
