= Oak City =

Oak City is the name of several towns in the United States:

- Oak City, North Carolina
- Oak City, Utah
