= Flowers, North Carolina =

Unincorporated community in North Carolina, US

Coordinates: 35°39′14″N 78°20′42″W

Flowers is an unincorporated community in Johnston County, North Carolina, United States, west of Jordan, east of Clayton, and southeast of Archer Lodge. It lies at an elevation of 289 feet (88 m).

It is named for famed bootlegger and land owner Percy Flowers, who owned much of the property in the area. Prior to Flowers, the land was part of the Pineville plantation owned by Josiah Ogden Watson, a slaveholding physician who served in the War of 1812 and under Andrew Jackson at the defeat of Creek warriors at the Battle of Horseshoe Bend. After Watson's death, ownership of the plantation and its enslaved workers passed to his nephew J. W. B. Watson, a state senator who voted in favor of the state's secession from the Union.

While the borders of the community are not well defined, the intersection of Buffalo Road and North Carolina Highway 42, known as "Flowers Crossroads", is generally considered the center of the community. Some of the former landowners and enslaved people held on the old plantation are buried in a small cemetery just north of the crossroads. Flowers Plantation is a large housing development in the unincorporated community, that was voted 2013 and 2014 NC Community of the Year by the North Carolina Home Builders Association. The Flowers General Store is the main landmark at the center of the community.
