= North Carolina Highway 123 =

State highway in Greene County, North Carolina, US

North Carolina Highway 123

Route information
- Maintained by NCDOT
- Length: 10.2 mi (16.4 km)
- Existed: 1932–present

Major junctions
- South end: NC 58 in Glenfield Crossroads
- NC 903 in Maury
- North end: US 13 / US 258 in Lizzie

Location
- Country: United States
- State: North Carolina
- Counties: Greene

Highway system
- North Carolina Highway System; Interstate; US; State; Scenic
← NC 122	→ NC 124

North Carolina Highway 123 (NC 123) is a primary state highway in the U.S. state of North Carolina. It serves as the main road through Hookerton and an alternate bypass of Snow Hill, entirely in Greene County.

== Route description ==
NC 123 is a two-lane rural highway that begins at NC 58 in Glenfield Crossroads, and ends at US 13 and US 258 in Lizzie. 2.4 miles (3.9 km) from NC 58, it enters the town of Hookerton where it goes north along William Hooker Drive then east on Main Street. Crossing the Contentnea Creek, it continues north to Maury, where it connects with NC 903. After 10.2 miles (16.4 km) through mostly farmland country, it reaches Lizzie where it ends.

The routing makes it an optional bypass of Snow Hill, for those traveling between Kinston and Farmville; however, speed limit drops to 35 miles per hour (56 km/h) in both Hookerton and Maury, so any time save is minimal.

== History ==
NC 123 was established in 1932 as a new primary spur from US 258/NC 12 in Glenfield Crossroads, to the town of Hookerton. In 1938, it was extended north to NC 102 in Maury. In 1951, it extended northwest to its current northern terminus at US 258 in Lizzie.

== Junction list ==
The entire route is in Greene County.

Location	mi	km	Destinations	Notes
Glenfield Crossroads	0.0	0.0	NC 58 – Kinston, Snow Hill	Southern terminus
Maury	7.5	12.1	NC 903 – Snow Hill, Winterville	
Lizzie	10.2	16.4	US 13 / US 258 (R.B. Nelson Highway) – Farmville, Snow Hill	Northern terminus
1.000 mi = 1.609 km; 1.000 km = 0.621 mi
