= North Carolina Highway 125 =

State highway in North Carolina, US

North Carolina Highway 125

Route information
- Maintained by NCDOT
- Length: 66.9 mi (107.7 km)
- Existed: 1922–present
- Tourist routes: Lafayette's Tour; Tar Heel Trace

Major junctions
- South end: Martin County SR 1142 in Williamston
- US 13 / US 64 in Williamston; NC 903; NC 11 / NC 42 in Oak City; US 258 in Scotland Neck; NC 903 in Scotland Neck; US 301 near Halifax; I-95 near Roanoke Rapids; US 158 in Roanoke Rapids
- North end: NC 48 in Roanoke Rapids

Location
- Country: United States
- State: North Carolina
- Counties: Martin, Halifax

Highway system
- North Carolina Highway System; Interstate; US; State; Scenic
← NC 124	→ NC 126

North Carolina Highway 125 (NC 125) is a primary state highway in the U.S. state of North Carolina that serves the communities of Williamston, Hamilton, Oak City, Hobgood, Scotland Neck, Halifax, and Roanoke Rapids.

== Route description ==
The southern terminus of the route is Martin County SR 1142 (Prison Camp Road) in front of the Senator Bob Martin Eastern Agricultural Center. About 1/2 mile (0.80 km) north of its interchange with US 13 and US 64, the highway proceeds into the Williamston city limits. After leaving Williamston, NC 125 continues north to serve the small communities of Hamilton, Oak City, Scotland Neck, and Halifax. The highway has an interchange with I-95 shortly before entering its destination town of Roanoke Rapids. The route terminates at NC 48 in the downtown area.

== History ==
The route was created in 1922, running from Williamston to Rich Square. The section between Scotland Neck and Rich Square was rerouted in 1925; the northern terminus of NC 125 was moved near Halifax. In 1965 the route was expanded northwards, replacing several secondary routes, to end at US 158 in Roanoke Rapids. The current northern terminus was achieved in 1981, following East 10th Street to the NC 48 intersection. The 1990s saw the highway receive an interchange with I-95, and the southern terminus was extended to its current position.

In March 2025, the North Carolina Department of Transportation (NCDOT) moved NC 125 onto new alignment bypassing west of Williamston.

== Junction list ==
County	Location	mi	km	Destinations	Notes
Martin	Williamston	0.0	0.0	Martin County SR 1142 (Prison Camp Road) – Greenville	
Martin		0.4– 0.6	0.64– 0.97	US 13 / US 64 – Windsor, Plymouth, Robersonville	Exit 512 (US 64)
Martin	Williamston	2.0	3.2	US 64 Alt. (West Main Street) – Everetts, Williamston	
Martin		12.9	20.8	NC 903 south – Robersonville	South end of NC 903 concurrency
Martin		14.1	22.7	NC 142 west – Hassell	Eastern terminus of NC 142
Martin	Hamilton	16.8	27.0	NC 903 north (North Front Street) / East Liberty Street – Scotland Neck, Palmyra	North end of NC 903 concurrency
Martin	Oak City	22.6	36.4	NC 11 / NC 42 – Greenville, Lewiston Woodville	
Halifax	Hobgood	30.3	48.8	NC 122 south (Pine Street) to NC 97 – Tarboro	Northern terminus of NC 122
Halifax	Scotland Neck	37.4	60.2	US 258 south – Tarboro	South end of US 258 concurrency
Halifax	Scotland Neck	37.8	60.8	NC 903 south (9th Street) – Hamilton	South end of NC 903 concurrency
Halifax	Scotland Neck	38.1	61.3	US 258 north (Main Street) / East 12th Street – Rich Square	North end of US 258 concurrency
Halifax	Crowells Crossroads	48.3	77.7	NC 481 – Enfield, Tillery	
Halifax	Ruggles	52.7	84.8	US 301 south – Enfield	South end of US 301 concurrency
Halifax	Pender	54.9	88.4	NC 561 east – Tillery	South end of NC 561 concurrency
Halifax		55.3	89.0	NC 561 west to I-95	North end of NC 561 concurrency
Halifax	Halifax	55.7	89.6	US 301 Bus. north (King Street)	Southern terminus of US 301 Bus.
Halifax	Halifax	56.3	90.6	US 301 north / Pittsylvania Street – Weldon	North end of US 301 concurrency
Halifax		58.6	94.3	NC 903 north / J.S. Pope Road – Littleton	North end of NC 903 concurrency
Halifax	Roanoke Rapids	62.0– 62.3	99.8– 100.3	I-95 – Rocky Mount, Richmond	Exit 171 (I-95)
Halifax	Roanoke Rapids	65.1	104.8	US 158 (Littleton Road) to I-95	
Halifax	Roanoke Rapids	66.9	107.7	NC 48 (Roanoke Avenue) / West 10th Street	
1.000 mi = 1.609 km; 1.000 km = 0.621 mi: Concurrency terminus
