= Jordan, North Carolina =

Unincorporated community in North Carolina, US

Coordinates: 35°40′09″N 78°18′25″W

Jordan is an unincorporated community in Johnston County, North Carolina, United States, off North Carolina Highway 42, and North Carolina Highway 96, east of Flowers. It lies at an elevation of 266 feet (81 m).
