= North Carolina Highway 111 =

State highway in North Carolina, US

North Carolina Highway 111

- Route of NC 111 highlighted in red

Route information
- Maintained by NCDOT
- Length: 126.0 mi (202.8 km)
- Existed: 1930–present

Major junctions
- South end: US 258 / NC 24 in Catherine Lake
- US 13 / US 70 in Goldsboro; US 264 in Saratoga; I-587 near Saratoga; US 64 / US 258 in Tarboro
- North end: NC 11 / NC 42 in Oak City

Location
- Country: United States
- State: North Carolina
- Counties: Onslow, Duplin, Wayne, Wilson, Edgecombe, Martin

Highway system
- North Carolina Highway System; Interstate; US; State; Scenic
← NC 110	→ NC 112

North Carolina Highway 111 (NC 111) is a 126.0-mile-long (202.8 km) primary state highway in the U.S. state of North Carolina. Traveling north–south through Eastern North Carolina, it connects the various rural towns and communities with the cities of Jacksonville (via U.S. Route 258 (US 258) and NC 24), Goldsboro and Tarboro.

== History ==
NC 111 was established in 1930 as a new primary routing between NC 11, in Kornegay, and US 70/NC 10, in Goldsboro; the highway was mostly graded dirt, serving the Drummersville community. By 1935, NC 111 was extended through Goldsboro to Cherry Hospital, replacing NC 402. Also in 1935, NC 111 was realigned in Wayne County and was extended south on new primary routing to NC 24, four miles (6.4 km) west of Beulaville. In 1940, NC 111 was rerouted at Albertson.

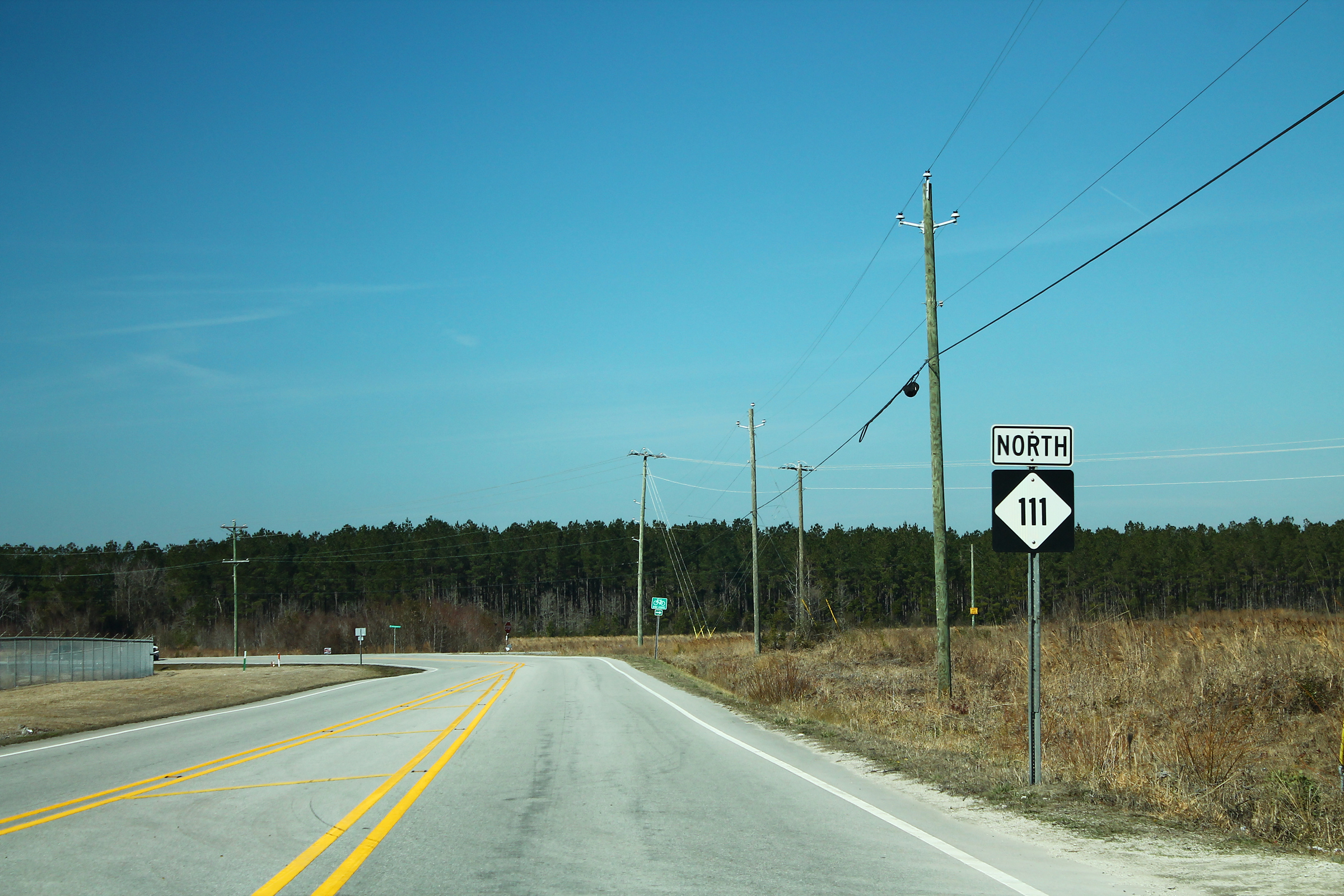
NC 111 along Catherine Lake Road

Between 1939 and 1944, NC 111 was rerouted in Goldsboro, to accommodate the United States Army Air Corps Technical Training School (later becoming Seymour Johnson Air Force Base), it was moved from Slocumb Street to Piedmont Road. By 1948, NC 111 was rerouted southeast of NC 11 to Beulaville, ending at NC 24/NC 41; its old alignment along Williams Road was downgraded to secondary road (SR 1701). By 1949, NC 111 was truncated at US 70A/US 117A/NC 581 in Goldsboro; its routing to Cherry Hospital was replaced by NC 581. In 1959, NC 111 was rerouted for Seymour Johnson Air Force Base again, to its current approach to US 70; its old alignment became secondary roads Old 111 Highway (SR 1710) and Piedmont Airline Road (SR 1755).

In August 1984, NC 111 was extended, along with NC 41, south to Chinquapin, where it split off and continued west to its current southern terminus at US 258/NC 24, in Catherine Lake. This routing was initially established as a new primary routing for NC 144 a month prior, but was subsequently replaced before any actual signage was made.

On January 1, 1985, NC 111 was rerouted onto new northern bypass routing of Goldsboro, along with US 70; it then was extended as a new primary routing north to NC 222, near Eureka. The former Goldsboro downtown alignment was replaced with US 70 Business.

In May 1994, NC 111 was extended north along NC 222 to north of Saratoga, where it continues along new primary routing to Tarboro. In Tarboro, it took Wilson Street to Main Street south, crossing the Tar River, into Princeville and then overlapping briefly with US 258 before continuing east along Greenwood Boulevard. At Fountain Fork, NC 111 turns northeast and ends at its current northern terminus at NC 11/NC 44, in Oak City. In July 1994, NC 111, and other primary routes, were rerouted out of Tarboro and onto US 64/US 258 over the Tar River to Princeville.

=== North Carolina Highway 402 ===
North Carolina Highway 402
- Location: Goldsboro, North Carolina
- Length: 1.8 mi (2.9 km)
- Existed: 1933–1935

North Carolina Highway 402 (NC 402) was established as a new primary spur highway from US 1/US 17/NC 40 in Goldsboro to Cherry Hospital, a state operated psychiatric hospital, via Ash Street. By 1935, it was renumbered as part of NC 111.

== Junction list ==
County	Location	mi	km	Destinations	Notes
Onslow	Catherine Lake	0.0	0.0	US 258 / NC 24 (Richlands Highway) – Jacksonville	Southern terminus
Duplin	Chinquapin	17.1	27.5	NC 41 west – Wallace	Southern end of NC 41 concurrency
Duplin	Beulaville	24.2	38.9	NC 24 (Main Street) / NC 241 begins	Southern end of NC 241 concurrency
Duplin	Beulaville	24.5	39.4	NC 41 east / NC 241 north – Trenton, Pine Hill	Northern end of NC 41 / NC 241 concurrencies
Duplin	Kornegay	34.7	55.8	NC 11 north – Trenton	Southern end of NC 11 concurrency
Duplin	Kornegay	35.0	56.3	NC 11 south / NC 903 south – Kenansville	Northern end of NC 11 concurrency; southern end of NC 903 concurrency
Duplin	Albertson	39.1	62.9	NC 903 north – La Grange	Northern end of NC 903 concurrency
Wayne	Hines Crossroads	47.0	75.6	NC 55 – Mount Olive, Kinston	
Wayne	Goldsboro	55.4	89.2	NC 581 north (Bill Lane Boulevard)	Southern terminus of NC 581
Wayne	Goldsboro	57.8	93.0	US 70 east / Millers Chapel Road – La Grange, Kinston	Southern end of US 70 concurrency
Wayne	Goldsboro	58.7	94.5	US 70 Bus. west (East Ash Street)	Eastern terminus of US 70 Bus.
Wayne	Goldsboro	60.1– 60.4	96.7– 97.2	US 13 north / North Berkeley Boulevard – Snow Hill, Johnson A.F.B.	Diamond interchange; southern end of US 13 concurrency
Wayne	Goldsboro	61.0– 61.4	98.2– 98.8	Cuyler Best Road / Spence Avenue	Partial cloverleaf interchange
Wayne	Goldsboro	62.2– 62.7	100.1– 100.9	Wayne Memorial Drive – Goldsboro High School, Wayne Community College	Partial cloverleaf interchange
Wayne	Goldsboro	63.3– 63.5	101.9– 102.2	US 13 south / US 70 west to I-795 / US 117 Bus. south (North William Street) – Wilson, Raleigh	Northern end of US 13 / US 70 concurrencies; southern end of US 117 Bus. Concurrency
Wayne	Goldsboro	64.1	103.2	US 117 / US 117 Bus. ends – Pikeville	Northern end of US 117 Bus. Concurrency
Wayne		75.2	121.0	NC 222 west	Western end of NC 222 concurrency
Wilson	Stantonsburg	82.8	133.3	NC 58 north – Wilson	Southern end of NC 58 concurrency
Wilson	Stantonsburg	83.1	133.7	NC 58 south / Saratoga Street – Pine Hill	Northern end of NC 58 concurrency
Wilson	Saratoga	87.3	140.5	US 264 (Main Street) – Wilson, Farmville	
Wilson		88.3– 88.5	142.1– 142.4	I-587 – Wilson, Farmville	Exit 53 (I-587)
Wilson		88.6	142.6	NC 222 east – Fountain	Eastern end of NC 222 concurrency
Edgecombe		96.0	154.5	NC 124	
Edgecombe		98.7	158.8	NC 42 – Pinetops, Wilson	
Edgecombe		100.6	161.9	NC 43	
Edgecombe		101.7	163.7	NC 122 south – Pinetops	Southern end of NC 122 concurrency
Edgecombe	Tarboro	106.5	171.4	NC 122 north (McNair Road) to US 64 / Sara Lee Road	Northern end of NC 122 concurrency
Edgecombe	Tarboro	108.8	175.1	US 64 Alt. west / NC 122 south (Western Boulevard) / Wilson Street	Southern end of US 64 Alt. / NC 122 concurrency
Edgecombe	Tarboro	109.1– 109.7	175.6– 176.5	US 64 west / US 258 south / US 64 Alt. ends – Rocky Mount, Farmville	Western end of US 64 Alt. concurrency; Eastern end of US 64 / US 258 concurrencies; exit 485 (US 64)
Edgecombe	Princeville	110.3– 110.7	177.5– 178.2	US 64 east / US 64 Alt. begins – Williamston	Western end of US 64 concurrency; eastern end of US 64 Alt. concurrency; exit 486 (US 64); access from southbound NC 111 to westbound US 64 / eastbound US 64 to northbound NC 111 only
Edgecombe	Princeville	111.0	178.6	US 64 Alt. east / NC 33	Northern end of US 64 Alt. concurrency
Edgecombe	Princeville	111.4	179.3	US 258 north / NC 122 north (Mutual Boulevard) – Scotland Neck	Northern end of US 258 / NC 122 concurrencies
Edgecombe	Fountain Fork	121.0	194.7	NC 142 east – Hassell	Western terminus of NC 142
Martin	Oak City	126.0	202.8	NC 11 / NC 42 – Lewiston Woodville, Bethel	Northern terminus
1.000 mi = 1.609 km; 1.000 km = 0.621 mi: Concurrency terminus
