= North Carolina Highway 42 =

State highway in North Carolina, US

North Carolina Highway 42
- NC 42/NC 36 highlighted in red

Route information
- Maintained by NCDOT
- Length: 222.9 mi (358.7 km)
- Existed: 1922–present
- Tourist routes: Tar Heel Trace

Major junctions
- West end: I-73 / I-74 / US 220 in Asheboro
- US 1 / US 15 / US 501 in Sanford; US 421 in Sanford; I-40 near Cleveland (as NC 36); I-42 in Clayton (as NC 36); I-95 near Wilson; I-587 / I-795 / US 264 near Wilson; US 301 in Wilson; US 258 near Pinetops; US 64 near Conetoe; US 13 in Ahoskie
- East end: NC 45 in Colerain

Location
- Country: United States
- State: North Carolina
- Counties: Randolph, Chatham, Lee, Harnett, Wake, Johnston, Wilson, Edgecombe, Martin, Bertie, Hertford

Highway system
- North Carolina Highway System; Interstate; US; State; Scenic
← I-42	→ NC 43
← NC 35	NC 36	→ NC 37

North Carolina Highway 42 (NC 42) is a primary state highway in the U.S. state of North Carolina and a semi-urban traffic artery connecting Asheboro, Sanford, Clayton, Wilson and Ahoskie as well as many small- to medium-sized towns throughout Central and Eastern North Carolina. The highway is primarily rural, avoiding larger cities such as Raleigh. NC 42 begins at I-73/I-74/US 220 on the western side of Asheboro. From there the highway runs southeast toward Sanford. Running through the heart of Sanford, NC 42 intersects several major highways such as US 1 and US 421. Leaving Sanford the highway runs along the southern side of the Triangle Area, while servicing the smaller towns of Fuquay-Varina and Clayton, the latter of which is while the route is designated as North Carolina Highway 36 (NC 36). Further east the highway intersects both I-95 and US 264, shortly before entering central Wilson. Leaving Wilson the highway continues to the northeast, and intersects US 258 near Crisp. North of intersecting US 64, NC 42 begins a concurrency with NC 11 from Hassell to western Ahoskie. Nearing Ahoskie the highway turns to the east and runs south of the center of the town. NC 42 follows concurrently with US 13 southeast to Powellsville. Nearing its eastern terminus the highway turns east along its own routing until reaching NC 45 in Colerain where the highway ends. NC 42 is the third longest state highway in the U.S. state of North Carolina.

NC 42 was established as an original state highway running from NC 133 north of Wilson to NC 12 in Pinetops. Between 1934 and 1935 NC 42 was extended twice, first to NC 23 south of Emit, and then to US 15A west of McCullers. The western terminus of the highway was moved in 1948 to US 15A (Now US 401) in Fuquay-Varina, placing NC 42 on its modern routing south of Raleigh. Four years later, NC 42's eastern terminus was extended to US 64 in Conetoe. In 1960 the highway was extended to US 421 east of Sanford. However, in 1963 NC 42 was routed concurrently with US 421 through Sanford before following its own routing to NC 22. The highway then followed NC 22 to the northwest, and replaced NC 902 between Coleridge and Asheboro. The same year, NC 42 was extended along new routing through Hassell, ending at NC 125 south of Hamilton. In 1976, NC 42 was routed along NC 11 and US 13 through Ahoskie and then replaced NC 350 to NC 45 in Colerain. The last major change to NC 42 came in 2025, when the highway was rerouted around Clayton and re-designated as NC 36 as part of the I-42 project. This created a gap in the route, but NC 36 is still considered to be a part of NC 42.

== Route description ==
=== Asheboro to Sanford ===
The western terminus of NC 42 is located at I-73, I-74, and US 220 in Western Asheboro. The ramps for the interchange are located in the median of I-73, I-74, and US 220, meaning NC 42 begins in the center of the freeway. NC 42 begins by travelling east along Salisbury Street toward downtown. At the interchange, NC 42 is a four-lane highway, yet narrows to two-lanes west of McIntyre Street. NC 42 briefly parallels, and later crosses a railroad operated by Norfolk Southern. NC 42 intersects US 220 Business (Fayetteville Street) in the central business area of Asheboro. From the intersection, NC 42 travels east through a residential area of Asheboro. At a three-way junction, NC 42 bears to the southeast towards US 64 Business. NC 42 intersects US 64 Business at Dixie Drive, in a commercialized area of Asheboro. Travelling southeast, NC 42 runs adjacent to several residential neighborhoods on the outskirts of the city. NC 42 meets US 64 Bypass at a partial cloverleaf interchange southwest of Asheboro. The highway continues to run in a southeasterly direction, passing to the north of the North Carolina Zoo.

As NC 42 travels further from Asheboro, the surrounding area becomes increasingly rural. Large forested areas and farms are mixed with sparse houses. NC 42 begins a slow turn to the east south of Hayfield Drive, which it completes before reaching Old Cox Road/Grantville Lane. The highway continues eastward until reaching Hinshaw Town Road, where NC 42 bears to the southeast. NC 42 continues southeastward for 2.1 miles (3.4 km) until making a turn to the northeast. The highway continues for 2.9 miles (4.7 km), before crossing Deep River west of Coleridge. NC 42 briefly parallels the river in Coleridge, before intersecting NC 22. At the intersection, NC 42 turns to the south to follow concurrently with NC 22 toward Sanford. NC 22/NC 42 briefly travel to the south before turning southeastward. The highway once again parallels the Deep River for 0.4-mile (0.64 km) until the river turns to the south. NC 42 continues to run concurrently with NC 22 for 9.4-mile (15.1 km) to the southeast. NC 22 and NC 42 pass to the south and west of the town of Bennett. South of Bennett, NC 22 and NC 42 intersects the western terminus of NC 902. NC 22 and NC 42 continue to run concurrently for 1.4 miles (2.3 km) southeast of NC 902. At an intersection with Charlie Garner Road, NC 42 bears to the east toward Sanford. NC 42 crosses several tributaries of the Deep River prior to intersecting Siler City-Glendon Road. East of the intersection, NC 42 makes multiple curves which temporarily adjust its orientation to the northeast and southeast. The final curve adjust the orientation of NC 42 southeastward toward Carbonton. NC 42 continues through the unincorporated community before crossing the Deep River and entering into Lee County. Beginning at the Lee County line, NC 42 is given the name "Carbonton Road". At Woolard Road, NC 42 turns to the east toward Sanford. Several curves between Woolard Road and Sanford give the highway a slightly southeastward orientation. Nearing Sanford, the highway begins to run adjacent to residential neighborhoods west of the city. The road name changes to Wicker Street at an intersection with Steel Bridge Road and Carbonton Road in western Sanford. NC 42 continues east along Wicker Street for 1.8 miles (2.9 km) before meeting US 1, US 15, and US 501 at a diamond interchange.

=== Sanford to Clayton ===
After an interchange with US 1, US 15 and US 501, NC 42 continues northeast along Wicker Street into Sanford. Until reaching Carthage Street the area is mostly residential, however as the road continues east more commercial buildings are found roadside. In downtown Sanford, NC 42 turns to the south along US 421 Business (South Horner Boulevard), exiting the downtown area. The highway passes under a railroad operated by CSX Transportation and the turns toward the southeast. The four lane highway enters into a primarily commercial area until NC 42 turns off at Main Street. After crossing a railroad operated by Atlantic and Western Railroad, the highway moves from a commercial area to a primarily residential area. After Rosser Road, the road name changes from Main Street to Broadway Road. NC 42 meets US 421 and NC 87 Bypass as it exits Sanford to the east. The highway passes by East Lee Middle School, along with several warehouses and a mobile home park all before leaving Sanford. NC 42 bears off along Avents Ferry Road to the northeast running toward Corinth. After intersecting Buck Horn Road, NC 42 begins a slow turn due north, however the highway begins a turn back to the northeast briefly before intersecting Poplar Springs Church Road. As NC 42 continues northeast, the highway crosses over the Cape Fear River. Avents Ferry Road meets with Corinth Road to the southwest of the town, and NC 42 turns right to follow Corinth Road to the northeast. As NC 42 enters into the small community of Corinth, several houses appear alongside the highway. However, as the highway makes a slow turn to the southeast, the houses give way to forests alongside Harris Lake. NC 42 passes over a railroad operated by Norfolk Southern, briefly before the highway turns directly south. The highway makes several turns toward the northeast, routing the highway toward Duncan. Entering into the area around Duncan, several small farms appear alongside the road. NC 42 also turns toward the east to run through the heart of Duncan. Leaving Duncan to the east, NC 42 once again crosses the railroad operated by Norfolk Southern, however this time at an at-grade crossing. NC 42 turns to the northeast along Academy Street, and runs adjacent to several fields along with several rural neighborhoods. By the time the highway intersects Judd Parkway, the fields disappear into a strictly residential area. Just before entering into the downtown area, the highway once again crosses the Norfolk Southern Railway. In downtown Fuquay-Varina, NC 42 turns to the north and follows US 401 (Main Street) towards Raleigh. Main Street turns to the east, paralleling the adjacent railroad. US 401 and NC 42 meets up with NC 55 (Ennis Street) in a commercial area along the northern side of town. NC 42 continues to follow concurrently with US 401 and NC 55 for 2.0-mile (3.2 km), until both NC 42 and NC 55 bear off to the south. NC 42 and NC 55 stay concurrent for 0.3-mile (0.48 km) until NC 42 bears off to the southeast. The highway continues to run toward the east, with multiple neighborhoods and farms adjacent to the highway. NC 42 meets up with NC 50 in a rural area near Cleveland, at which point the route transitions from NC 42 to NC 36. Through Cleveland, the route serves as the main commercial district through the rapidly growing suburban area of northern Johnston County. The highway turns to the northeast, before entering a commercial area near the I-40 interchange. East of that interchange, NC 36 crosses Swift Creek and meets up with I-42 at exit 4. NC 36 becomes concurrent with I-42 and both travel eastward until splitting at the next exit (exit 7). NC 36 then continues northeastward along Ranch Road.

=== Clayton to Wilson ===
Southeast of Clayton, NC 36 intersects US 70. The route transitions back to NC 42 at the intersection and continues northeastward as four lane highway. The highway bears further to the east before passing by several research and industrial buildings. As the highway continues east, it crosses the Neuse River, another elementary school along with multiple residential developments. NC 42 intersects NC 96 southwest of the unincorporated community of Jordan. 1.7 miles (2.7 km) after intersecting NC 96, NC 42 intersects NC 39 and turns toward the northeast, before making another slight turn to the east. Continuing east, NC 42 meets NC 222 and the highway's share a brief 0.2 miles (0.32 km) concurrency. From there, NC 42 and Little Creek begin to parallel each other. Several accesses to Buckhorn Reservoir are located along the northern side of NC 42. Just past the reservoir, NC 42 meets up with NC 581, and begins a turn to the northeast to parallel I-95. NC 42 makes a slight turn to the east and meets up with I-95 at exit 116. Past I-95, NC 42 becomes a four lane divided highway. The highway meets up with I-587, I-795, and US 264 at exit 40 west of Wilson where you can see the beautiful Wilson skyline. NC 42 makes a turn to the northeast before turning back to the east and entering into Wilson from the east.

=== Wilson to Ahoskie ===
NC 42 enters into Wilson along Tarboro Street. Up to Forest Hills Road, the surrounding area is a mix of farms and residential housing, however after intersecting the road, the landscape turns into commercial buildings. The road passes by Wilson Medical Center along with a shopping center before intersecting US 264 Alternative at Ward Boulevard. At the Ward Boulevard intersection, NC 42 turns left to follow along the road to the north. After intersecting Parkwood Boulevard West, most of the stores fade away to a residential section of northwest Wilson. US 264 Alternate breaks away to the west at Raleigh Road Parkway. Continuing on Ward Boulevard, NC 42 makes a turn to the northeast before intersecting NC 58 at Nash Street. The highway turns directly west, running along the northern side of the Brentwood neighborhood. After intersecting Tilghman Road, the highway takes another right turn toward the southeast, now running along the eastern side of Wilson. Passing by Tosinot Reservoir to the west, the highway turns due south. Ward Boulevard and Raleigh Road Parkway meet again, at a T-Intersection. NC 42/NC 58 and Ward Boulevard all turn to the left to head to the southeast. NC 42 turns left at Herring Avenue, where the highway runs to the east. The residential neighborhoods surrounding the road quickly fade to farms and several large factories which are situated on the outside of the town. The highway meets US 301 at an interchange on the far eastern side of Wilson, before heading east–southeast.

After passing to the north of the residential community of Larkspur, the highway begins a slow turn to the northeast towards Pinetops. Approaching the unincorporated community of Wilbanks, several houses and churches appear adjacent to the highway. The highway turns due east, immediately before reaching NC 124. At the intersection, NC 42 turns and continues to the northeast. Approaching Pinetops, the highway intersects NC 111 before entering the town to the west. NC 42 enters into a residential area of western Pinetops along Hamlet Street. After Fifth Street, NC 42 enters into more of the commercial center of the town and passes by several stores. At Third Street, NC 42 intersects NC 43, and the two highway begins running concurrently to the east.

Leaving the center of Pinetops, the highway passes by several more stores and an elementary school before reentering a residential zone on the western side of the town. After intersecting Bynum Farm Road, the highway turns to the southeast and enters into a rural area with mostly farms and small forests. Between Matts Lane and Vinesdale Road the highway makes a turn due east before intersecting US 258. Continuing east, the highway intersects the eastern terminus of NC 124, immediately before NC 43 bears off to the southeast. The highway turns to the northeast through the unincorporated community of Old Sparta. Crossing the Tar River, NC 42 continues for 0.8-mile (1.3 km) before reaching NC 33. The highway continues east–northeast passing multiple fields and crossing several creeks before reaching Conetoe.

Nearing Conetoe, the highway turns due east, before turning to the northeast entering into the town limits along Church Street. Church Street runs through a residential area of the town and crosses a railroad operated by CSX Transportation. NC 42 meets US 64 Alternate (Canal Street) on the northeastern side of town, before exiting to the east. The highway makes a general turn to the northeast after intersecting Vine Lane and also enters into a forested area as it approaches US 64. The highway crosses Conetoe Creek before meeting up with US 64 at exit 494. The highway continues northeast through a mix of small forests and farms, and makes several curves to the north and east. NC 42 meets up with NC 142 west of Hassell. NC 142 follows concurrently along NC 42, as the highway makes a turn due east and meets up with NC 11. At the intersection NC 42 turns left to follow along NC 11 to the north, while NC 142 continues east towards Hassell. The two highways follow concurrently to the north–northwest towards Oak City. Before reaching the northern terminus of NC 111 in Oak City, the highways turn to the east–northeast. Entering into Oak City, the highway runs along the northern border of the town with homes along the southern side of the road and farms along the northern side. NC 11/NC 42 meet up with NC 125 on the northwest side of town, before exiting to the northeast. Between Oak City and the NC 903 intersection, the highway makes a general turn further east, however makes a turn back to the northeast immediately before reaching the highway. After the intersection, nearly all the farms dissipate into forests, and the highway continues running northeast. The highway crosses the Roanoke River before turning nearly due north. The highway makes several small turns further northeast before reaching the town of Lewiston Woodville. The highway bypasses the main part of the town to the east, with only a few houses, and several small stores found alongside the road. NC 11/NC 42 meet up with NC 308 at Church Street however quickly exit the town to the north. Between Lewiston Woodville and Aulander, the highway is relatively straight, making only one turn to the northeast briefly before passing the Luella community. South of Aulander the highway meets up with NC 11 Business, which runs to the west of its parent route through Aulander and along old NC 350.

The highway doesn't ever enter into the town limits of Aulander, instead it bypasses the town to the east. It meets up with NC 305 at Commerce Street, where several houses are found adjacent to the intersection, however the highway continues through mostly forests and small farms. Northeast of the unincorporated community of Millennium, the highway meets up with the northern terminus of NC 11 Business. The highway then turns further to the east toward Ahoskie. Nearing the town, the highway turns north to briefly parallel Knee Branch, before NC 42 breaks off of NC 11, turning to the east. Continuing east, the highway runs adjacent to several rural residential neighborhoods west of town. The highway turns northeast and crosses Ahoskie Creek before entering the town limits.

=== Ahoskie to Colerain ===
NC 42 enters the town on the southwestern side, following along Academy Street. Southwest of the central business district of Ahoskie, the highway meets up with US 13/NC 561 (Memorial Drive). At the intersection, NC 42 turns right to follow concurrently along US 13/NC 561 to the east–southeast. Memorial Drive continues through predominately residential area, until reaching Catherine Creek Road, where many more small stores are found adjacent to the highway. After passing a shopping center, NC 561 breaks off to the east toward Harrellsville. US 13/NC 42 turn further to the south before leaving the town limits of Ahoskie. As the highway continues to the southeast, the landscape changes back to mostly forests and farmland, however multiple houses are found along the segment between Ahoskie and Powellsville. The highway turns even further to the south after intersecting Creekside Drive. Once again, the highway crosses over Ashokie Creek, before nearing Powellsville. NC 42 breaks off of US 13 to the northeast of Powellsville and runs southeast along Main Street into town. The surrounding area is mostly residential with very few stores adjacent to the highway. After intersecting Commerce Street, NC 42 passes by both the town hall and the post office in Powellsville. The highway continues southeast along Main Street and passes a school before leaving the town. Even after leaving the town limits, the area alongside the highway remains rural residential until reaching Rockpile Road where most of the homes stop. NC 42 continues to the east–southeast through a very rural area with only a few small farms alongside the road. The highway crosses over and passes by several swamps as it runs toward Colerain. Nearing the town, the highway dips further to the south and then gradually turns back to the northeast. The highway turns nearly due east as it enters town along River Street. The remaining 0.6 miles (0.97 km) is mostly residential with several stores near the highways eastern terminus. NC 42 ends at NC 45 just north of the central business district of Colerain.

== History ==
NC 42 was first dedicated in 1922 as a modest 19-mile (31 km) connector from Wilson to Pinetops. In the 1930s and 40s it was extended west to Clayton and by 1950 it reached Fuquay-Varina. In the late 50s, early 60s it was extended in both directions to Conetoe in the east and Asheboro to the west. The last extension came in 1990 to meet with the I-73/I-74/US 220 freeway in Asheboro.

A major project to widen NC 42 east of Clayton from two lanes to four lanes with a divided median began in early 2010s. The first segment was between US 70 Bus to just west of the Neuse River bridge while the second segment extended the widening further to Buffalo Road in Flowers.

=== Designation history ===
North Carolina Highway 36
- Location: Clayton, North Carolina
- Length: 10.59 mi (17.04 km)
- Existed: 2025–present

In July 2023, NCDOT proposed creating a gap-in-route by renumbering a 10-mile section of NC 42 into NC 36, in Johnston County. The rationale is that it will eliminate confusion by those in the area between it and Interstate 42. NCDOT requested public input on this proposal at an open house on October 12, 2023.

In 2025, NCDOT officially renumbered a 10.59-mile (17.04 km) section of NC 42 into NC 36 around Interstate 42. While it does break-up NC 42 into two disconnected segments, NC 36 is still treated as the same state route.

== Future ==
NCDOT is currently planning to further widen NC 42 between NC 50 to US 70 Bus in Clayton to four lanes with a raised median as well. The project is set to start in Spring 2029. A separate project to convert the NC 42/I-40 interchange from a partial cloverleaf to a diverging diamond was also started and has since been completed. This project is part of the I-40 widening project between Southeast Raleigh to Clayton.

== Major intersections ==
County	Location	mi	km	Destinations	Notes
Randolph	Asheboro	0.0	0.0	I-73 / I-74 / US 220 / Salisbury Avenue – Greensboro, Rockingham	Exit 74 (I-73/I-74)
Randolph	Asheboro	0.9	1.4	US 220 Bus. (Fayetteville Street)	
Randolph	Asheboro	2.5	4.0	US 64 Bus. / NC 49 (Dixie Drive) – Lexington, Ramseur, Siler City, Raleigh	
Randolph	Asheboro	4.5	7.2	US 64 – Lexington, Siler City	Exit 349 on US 64
Randolph	Coleridge	15.6	25.1	NC 22 north / Creekwood Road – Ramseur	Western end of NC 22 concurrency
Chatham	Bennett	23.6	38.0	NC 902 east / Jerry Frye Road – Bear Creek	Western terminus of NC 902
Chatham		25.0	40.2	NC 22 south / Charlie Garner Road – High Falls	Eastern end of NC 22 concurrency
Lee	Sanford	45.5– 45.6	73.2– 73.4	US 1 / US 15 / US 501 / US 1 Bus. – Southern Pines, Raleigh	Interchange; western end of US 1 Bus. Concurrency
Lee	Sanford	47.1	75.8	US 1 Bus. north (Carthage Street) / US 421 Bus. north / NC 87 north (Horner Boulevard)	Eastern end of US 1 Bus. Concurrency; western end of US 421 Bus./NC 87 concurrency
Lee	Sanford	49.7	80.0	US 421 Bus. south / NC 87 south (Horner Boulevard) / NC 78 west (Main Street) – Old Jonesboro	
Lee	Sanford	51.2– 51.4	82.4– 82.7	US 421 / NC 87 Byp.	Exit 144 (US 421)
Chatham	No major junctions				
Harnett	No major junctions				
Wake	Fuquay-Varina	76.4	123.0	US 401 south (Main Street) / Academy Street – Fayetteville	Western end of US 401 concurrency
Wake	Fuquay-Varina	77.1	124.1	NC 55 west (Ennis Street) – Apex, Durham	Western end of NC 55 concurrency
Wake	Fuquay-Varina	79.1	127.3	US 401 north (Main Street)	Eastern end of US 401 concurrency
Wake	Fuquay-Varina	79.2	127.5	NC 55 east – Angier	Eastern end of NC 55 concurrency
Johnston		88.5	142.4	NC 50 – Garner, Benson	
Johnston		88.5	142.4	Route transition from NC 42 to NC 36	
Johnston		90.6– 90.8	145.8– 146.1	I-40 – Benson, Raleigh	Exit 312 (I-40)
Johnston		93.9– 94.1	151.1– 151.4	I-42 west – Garner	Exit 4 (I-42); western end of I-42 concurrency
Johnston				I-42 east – Smithfield, Selma	Exit 7 (I-42); eastern end of I-42 concurrency
Johnston	Clayton			US 70 – Smithfield, Selma	
Johnston	Clayton			Route transition from NC 36 to NC 42	
Johnston	Jordan			NC 96 – Zebulon, Selma	
Johnston				NC 39 – Selma, Bunn	
Johnston	Stancils Chapel			NC 222 – Wendell, Kenly	
Wilson				NC 581 – Bailey, Goldsboro	
Wilson	Rock Ridge			I-95 – Smithfield, Rocky Mount	Exit 116 (I-95)
Wilson				I-587 / I-795 / US 264 – Greenville, Raleigh	Exit 40 (I-587/I-795/US 264)
Wilson	Wilson			US 264 Alt. east (Ward Boulevard) / Tarbor Street	Western end of US 264 Alt. concurrency
Wilson	Wilson			US 264 Alt. west (Raleigh Road Boulevard)	Eastern end of US 264 Alt. concurrency
Wilson	Wilson			NC 58 north (Nash Street) – Nashville, Castalia, RWI Airport	Western end of NC 58 concurrency
Wilson	Wilson			NC 58 south (Ward Boulevard) / Herring Street	Eastern end of NC 58 concurrency
Wilson	Wilson			US 301 – Rocky Mount	Interchange
Edgecombe				NC 124 east – Macclesfield	Western terminus of NC 124
Edgecombe				NC 111 – Tarboro	
Edgecombe	Pinetops			NC 43 north (3rd Street)	Western end of NC 43 concurrency
Edgecombe	Pinetops			NC 122 (2nd Street)	
Edgecombe				US 258 – Tarboro, Princeville, Kinston	
Edgecombe				NC 124 west – Macclesfield	Eastern terminus of NC 124
Edgecombe				NC 43 south – Greenville	
Edgecombe	Old Sparta			NC 33 – Princeville, Greenville	
Edgecombe	Conetoe			US 64 Alt. – Tarboro, Bethel	
Edgecombe				US 64 – Williamston, Tarboro	Exit 494 (US 64)
Martin				NC 142 west – Princeville	Western end of NC 142 concurrency
Martin				NC 11 south / NC 142 east – Bethel, Hassell	Eastern end of NC 142 concurrency; western end of NC 11 concurrency
Martin				NC 111 south – Tarboro	Northern terminus of NC 111
Martin	Oak City			NC 125 – Hobgood, Hamilton	
Martin				NC 903 – Scotland Neck, Hamilton	
Bertie	Lewiston Woodville			NC 308 (Church Street) – Windsor	
Bertie				NC 11 Bus. north / SR 1209 – Aulander	Southern terminus of NC 11 Bus.
Bertie				NC 305 (Commerce Street) – Aulander, Windsor	
Hertford				NC 11 Bus. south – Aulander	Northern terminus of NC 11 Bus.
Hertford	Poor Town			NC 11 north – Murfreesboro	Eastern end of NC 11 concurrency
Hertford	Ahoskie			US 13 north / NC 561 west (Academy Street) / Memorial Drive – Winton	Western end of US 13/NC 561 concurrencies
Hertford	Ahoskie			NC 561 east	Eastern end of NC 561 concurrency
Bertie				US 13 south – Windsor	Eastern end of US 13 concurrency
Bertie	Colerain			NC 45 (Main Street) / River Street – Harrellsville, Plymouth	
1.000 mi = 1.609 km; 1.000 km = 0.621 mi: Concurrency terminus; Route transition

== See also ==
- North Carolina Bicycle Route 2-Concurrent with NC 42 from Old Sparta to NC 33 in Edgecombe County
- North Carolina Bicycle Route 6-Concurrent with NC 42 from Old NC Highway 13 to Hinshaw Town Road in Randolph County
