= Ebony, Virginia =

Census-designated place in Virginia, US

Coordinates: 36°34′44″N 77°59′27″W

Ebony is an unincorporated community and census-designated place (CDP) in Brunswick County, Virginia, United States. As of the 2020 census, Ebony had a population of 150.

== Demographics ==
Historical population
Census	Pop.	Note	%±
2010	161		—
2020	150		−6.8%
U.S. Decennial Census; 2010 2020

Ebony was first listed as a census designated place in the 2010 U.S. census.

=== Racial and ethnic composition ===
Ebony CDP, Virginia – Racial and ethnic composition Note: the US Census treats Hispanic/Latino as an ethnic category. This table excludes Latinos from the racial categories and assigns them to a separate category. Hispanics/Latinos may be of any race.
Race / Ethnicity (NH = Non-Hispanic)	Pop 2010	Pop 2020	% 2010	% 2020
White alone (NH)	95	90	59.01%	60.00%
Black or African American alone (NH)	60	46	37.27%	30.67%
Native American or Alaska Native alone (NH)	0	0	0.00%	0.00%
Asian alone (NH)	0	0	0.00%	0.00%
Native Hawaiian or Pacific Islander alone (NH)	0	0	0.00%	0.00%
Other race alone (NH)	0	0	0.00%	0.00%
Mixed race or Multiracial (NH)	1	11	0.62%	7.33%
Hispanic or Latino (any race)	5	3	3.11%	2.00%
Total	161	150	100.00%	100.00%
