= Percy Flowers =

American businessman

Joshua Percy Flowers (1903–1982) was an American businessman and moonshiner. Flowers began purchasing land in the early years of the Great Depression to farm cotton and tobacco, and it produced crops until the 1970s. He was a businessman, a philanthropist, a noted fox hunter, and "North Carolina's number one" producer of illegal alcohol in the mid twentieth century.

== Career ==
Flowers purchased several pieces of land during the early portion of the Great Depression and farmed the land until the 1970s. he is reported to have been "a pillar of the White Oak Baptist Church", and to have had close ties with local politicians. He operated an illegal liquor production facility on his 5,000-acre (20 km^{2}) farm in Johnston County, North Carolina during the 1950s and 1960s. He is reputed to have earned $1million per year in untaxed revenue through this endeavor. Flowers was indicted ten times by federal grand juries, and eighteen times at the state and local level. He was variously charged with bootlegging, reckless driving, illegal purchase of a firearm, and tax evasion but "rarely spent anytime in jail." Flowers was known as "king of the moonshiners." As a result of his open disregard for the laws governing alcohol production and consumption along with his "lavish" donations to his church and those in need, he was seen by some as a Robin Hood-like folk hero.

== Personal life ==
Flowers was married with two children. His son was killed in an aviation accident in 1952. Flower's daughter began to develop his plantation in 1978.
