= Maury, North Carolina =

- Census-designated place
- Location within North Carolina Location within the United States
- Coordinates: 35°28′45″N 77°35′25″W
- Country: United States
- State: North Carolina
- County: Greene

Area
  - Total: 1.05 sq mi (2.73 km^{2})
  - Land: 1.05 sq mi (2.73 km^{2})
  - Water: 0 sq mi (0.00 km^{2})
- Elevation: 66 ft (20 m)

Population (2020)
  - Total: 1,404
  - Density: 1,333.6/sq mi (514.89/km^{2})
- Time zone: UTC-5 (Eastern (EST))
  - Summer (DST): UTC-4 (EDT)
- ZIP code: 28554
- Area code: 252
- GNIS feature ID: 2628644
- FIPS code: 37-42000

Maury is an unincorporated community and census-designated place (CDP) in Greene County, North Carolina, United States. As of the 2020 census, Maury had a population of 1,404. Maury has a post office with ZIP code 28554. North Carolina Highway 123 and North Carolina Highway 903 intersect in the community.

Maury is home to two prisons, Greene Correctional Institution and Eastern Correctional Institution, as well as a site belonging to North Carolina Department of Transportation.

== Demographics ==
Historical population
Census	Pop.	Note	%±
2020	1,404		—
U.S. Decennial Census
