= Hamilton, North Carolina =

- Town
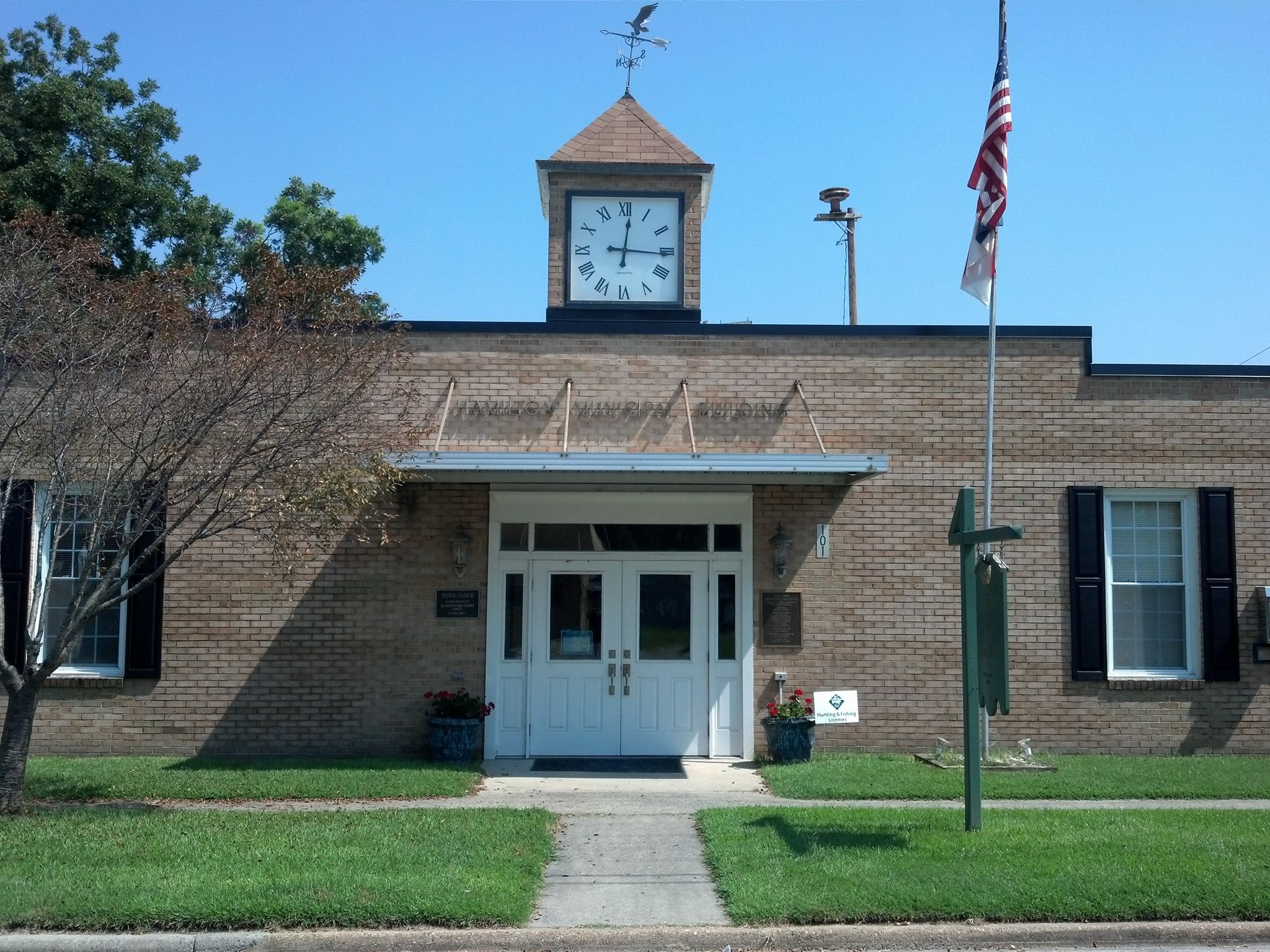
- Hamilton Town Hall

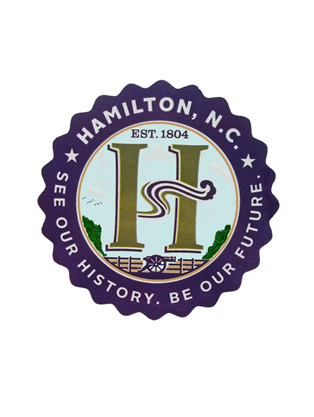
- Seal
- Motto(s): "See our History, Be our Future."
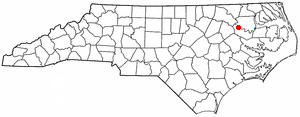
- Location within the U.S. state of North Carolina
- Coordinates: 35°56′40″N 77°12′24″W
- Country: United States
- State: North Carolina
- County: Martin
- Incorporated: 1804

Government
  - Type: Mayor-Council
  - Mayor: Ervin Williams

Area
  - Total: 0.49 sq mi (1.28 km^{2})
  - Land: 0.49 sq mi (1.28 km^{2})
  - Water: 0 sq mi (0.00 km^{2})
- Elevation: 72 ft (22 m)

Population (2020)
  - Total: 306
  - Density: 619.3/sq mi (239.11/km^{2})
- Time zone: UTC-5 (Eastern (EST))
  - Summer (DST): UTC-4 (EDT)
- ZIP Code: 27840
- Area code: 252
- FIPS code: 37-29120
- GNIS feature ID: 2406639
- Website: town-of-hamilton.org

Hamilton is a town in Martin County, North Carolina, United States. The population was 306 at the 2020 census.

== History ==
The town was founded in 1804 at the highest point of navigation on the Roanoke River.

=== American Civil War ===
According to local historians, the most significant historical event of early Hamilton was the battle and fall of Fort Branch during the American Civil War, when Union vessels and troops came upriver from Plymouth in an attempt to reach Weldon to cut off supplies to General Robert E. Lee. The fort, located 2 miles (3 km) southeast of Hamilton along the Roanoke River, protected Weldon until the day after General Lee surrendered at Appomattox Court House, whereupon the railroad line over the Weldon bridge had no more military significance. Afterwards, the fort was abandoned and the cannons were dumped into the Roanoke by departing Confederate troops.

=== Reconstruction ===
In 1887, the town saw construction of its first railroad, the Hamilton Railroad & Lumber Company, also known as Hitch's Railroad. This was a short line that served the lumber industry in the area, but later expanded operations.

=== Modern Era ===
In the 1910s, a Rosenwald school was constructed in Hamilton to serve the local black community. Alternating dates of construction are reported, with the earliest being 1914. The school was operated until 1960.

Hamilton, once a Victorian port town with many of its homes listed in the National Historic Registry, has been in decline in recent years, losing more than half its population since 1980.

== Geography ==
Hamilton is in northwestern Martin County, bordered to the east by Bertie County. The Roanoke River forms the eastern border of the town and serves as the county line.

North Carolina Highway 125 passes through the town as West Liberty Street and South Front Street, while Highway 903 passes through entirely on Front Street. Highway 125 leads southeast 12 miles (19 km) to Williamston, the Martin county seat, and west 6 miles (10 km) to Oak City, while Highway 903 leads south 10 miles (16 km) to Robersonville and northwest 18 miles (29 km) to Scotland Neck.

According to the U.S. Census Bureau, the town has a total area of 0.49 square miles (1.27 km^{2}), all land. It sits at an elevation of 79 feet (24.0 m) above sea level along the Roanoke River at its 60 Mile mark.

== Demographics ==
Historical population
Census	Pop.	Note	%±
1860	242		—
1870	200		−17.4%
1880	369		84.5%
1890	781		111.7%
1900	493		−36.9%
1910	452		−8.3%
1920	474		4.9%
1930	508		7.2%
1940	524		3.1%
1950	514		−1.9%
1960	565		9.9%
1970	579		2.5%
1980	638		10.2%
1990	544		−14.7%
2000	516		−5.1%
2010	408		−20.9%
2020	306		−25.0%
. Decennial Census

=== Racial and ethnic composition ===
Hamilton town, North Carolina – Racial and ethnic composition Note: the US Census treats Hispanic/Latino as an ethnic category. This table excludes Latinos from the racial categories and assigns them to a separate category. Hispanics/Latinos may be of any race.
Race / Ethnicity (NH = Non-Hispanic)	Pop 2000	Pop 2010	Pop 2020	% 2000	% 2010	% 2020
White alone (NH)	229	154	105	44.38%	37.75%	34.31%
Black or African American alone (NH)	268	143	175	51.94%	59.56%	57.19%
Native American or Alaska Native alone (NH)	0	1	1	0.00%	0.25%	0.33%
Asian alone (NH)	0	1	0	0.00%	0.25%	0.00%
Native Hawaiian or Pacific Islander alone (NH)	1	0	0	0.19%	0.00%	0.00%
Other Race alone (NH)	0	0	2	0.00%	0.00%	0.65%
Mixed race or Multiracial (NH)	0	5	9	0.00%	1.23%	2.94%
Hispanic or Latino (any race)	18	4	14	3.49%	0.98%	4.58%
Total	516	408	306	100.00%	100.00%	100.00%

=== 2000 census ===
As of the census of 2000, there were 516 people, 191 households, and 145 families residing in the town. The population density was 1,070.0 inhabitants per square mile (413.1/km^{2}). There were 216 housing units at an average density of 447.9 per square mile (172.9/km^{2}). The racial makeup of the town was 44.38% White, 53.29% African American, 0.19% Pacific Islander, 1.55% from other races, and 0.58% from two or more races. Hispanic or Latino of any race were 3.49% of the population.

There were 191 households, out of which 34.0% had children under the age of 18 living with them, 52.4% were married couples living together, 20.9% had a female householder with no husband present, and 23.6% were non-families. 22.5% of all households were made up of individuals, and 8.4% had someone living alone who was 65 years of age or older. The average household size was 2.57 and the average family size was 2.98.

In the town, the population was spread out, with 25.2% under the age of 18, 5.6% from 18 to 24, 23.4% from 25 to 44, 27.7% from 45 to 64, and 18.0% who were 65 years of age or older. The median age was 42 years. For every 100 females, there were 81.7 males. For every 100 females age 18 and over, there were 72.3 males.

The median income for a household in the town was $23,625, and the median income for a family was $28,977. Males had a median income of $27,500 versus $16,563 for females. The per capita income for the town was $12,832. About 18.2% of families and 24.1% of the population were below the poverty line, including 32.8% of those under age 18 and 43.4% of those age 65 or over.

== Culture & Community ==
=== Fort Branch Civil War Site ===
In July 1972, a group of men from Alabama came and began pulling cannons from the river. In an effort to keep the cannons in Martin County, the group was accused of violating North Carolina's antiquities laws. The courts officially decided that the cannons belong to the state under the North Carolina Department of Archives and History. The department decided to permanently loan the artifact to Fort Branch.

The Historic Hamilton Commission, started in 1976, is in charge of 52 other historic sites in the county, including St. Martin's Episcopal Church. The church was established as a missionary station of the Episcopal church in 1868. It was founded primarily by members of the Boyle family, including Francis Atherton Boyle and Mary A. Boyle. St. Martin's was admitted to the Episcopal convention in 1873. Building began in 1879. All of the construction materials were from local suppliers, except the bell and stained glass, which were imported from Wales. The church was consecrated on May 17, 1882. The Rev. Dr. Watson preached the sermon; Bishop Lyman celebrated Holy Communion. The church is now inactive, but is still owned by the Episcopal Diocese of East Carolina. This means it is still a consecrated church.

=== Hamilton Rosenwald School ===
Another important site in Hamilton is the Rosenwald School, a black school funded by Julius Rosenwald, president of Sears, Roebuck and Co. During segregation, white schools had approximately five times the funding of the former. The Rosenwald Fund sought to provide support for these underprivileged schools. According to the Roanoke River Partners, the Rosenwald School will be remodeled and used as their headquarters. Hamilton is at the exact middle of the course of the Roanoke River, making it a sensible location. Despite this, and years of taxpayer funding of the Roanoke River Partners, no concrete action has been taken to restore the building, which is currently dilapidated.
