= Oak City, North Carolina =

- Town
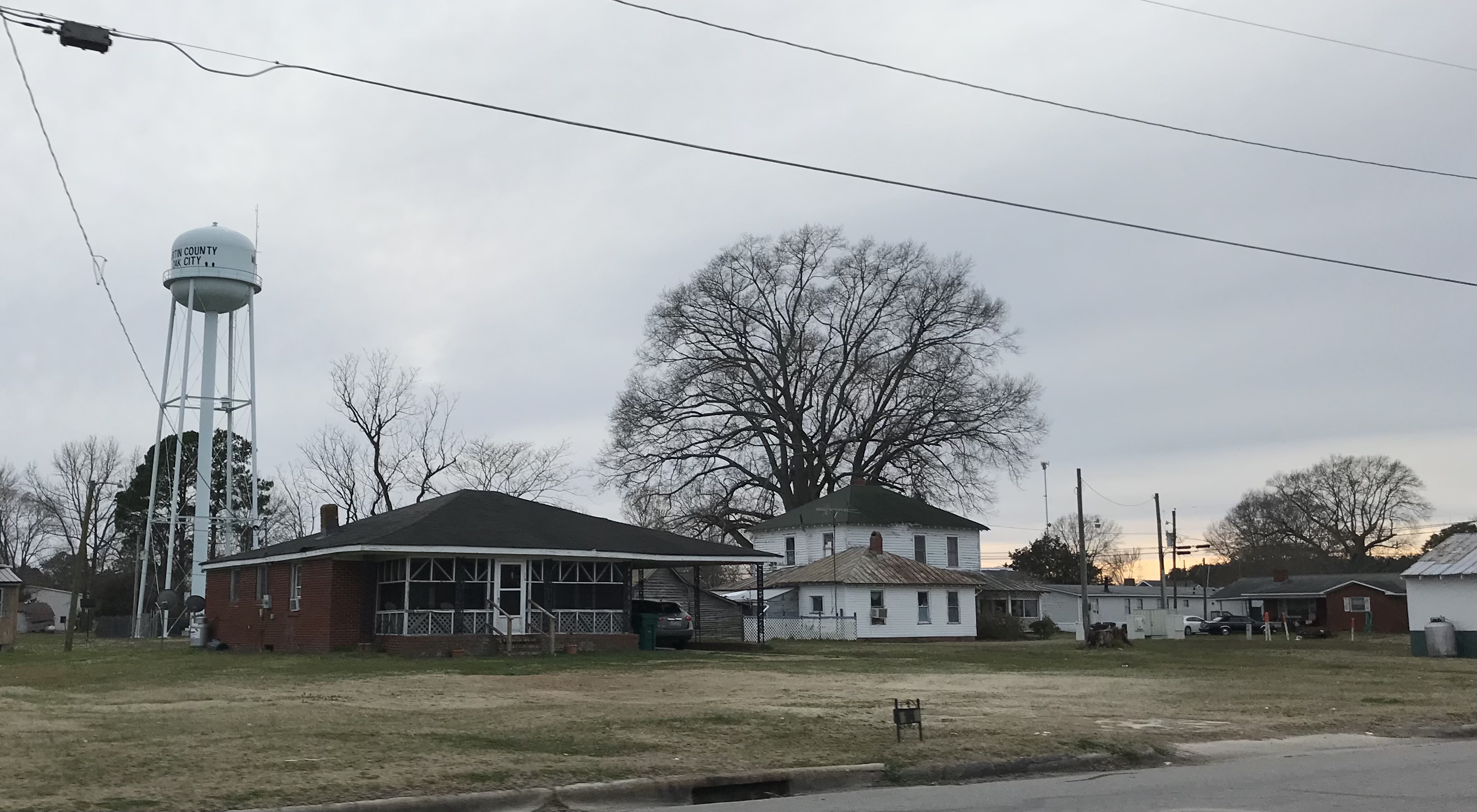

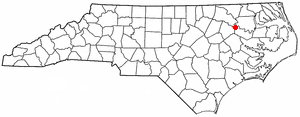
- Location in North Carolina
- Coordinates: 35°57′45″N 77°18′18″W
- Country: United States
- State: North Carolina
- County: Martin

Area
  - Total: 1.00 sq mi (2.60 km^{2})
  - Land: 1.00 sq mi (2.60 km^{2})
  - Water: 0 sq mi (0.00 km^{2})
- Elevation: 82 ft (25 m)

Population (2020)
  - Total: 266
  - Density: 265.2/sq mi (102.39/km^{2})
- Time zone: UTC-5 (Eastern (EST))
  - Summer (DST): UTC-4 (EDT)
- ZIP Code: 27857
- Area code: 252
- FIPS code: 37-48060
- GNIS feature ID: 2407014
- Website: www.townofoakcity.com

Oak City, formerly known as Goose Nest, is a town in Martin County, North Carolina, United States. The population was 266 at the 2020 census, down from 317 in 2010.

== Geography ==
Oak City is in northwestern Martin County, at the junction of state highways 125 and 11/42. Highway 125 leads southeast 18 miles (29 km) to Williamston, the county seat, and northwest 7 miles (11 km) to Hobgood, while Highways 11 and 42 lead northeast 14 miles (23 km) to Lewiston Woodville. To the southwest, Highway 11 leads 12 miles (19 km) to Bethel, while Highway 42 leads 15 miles (24 km) to Conetoe. North Carolina Highway 111 has its northern terminus at the western boundary of Oak City and leads southwest 16 miles (26 km) to Tarboro.

According to the U.S. Census Bureau, the town of Oak City has a total area of 1.0 square mile (2.6 km^{2}), all land.

== Demographics ==
Historical population
Census	Pop.	Note	%±
1900	115		—
1910	251		118.3%
1920	397		58.2%
1930	481		21.2%
1940	512		6.4%
1950	518		1.2%
1960	574		10.8%
1970	559		−2.6%
1980	475		−15.0%
1990	389		−18.1%
2000	339		−12.9%
2010	317		−6.5%
2020	266		−16.1%
U.S. Decennial Census

=== 2020 census ===
Oak City, North Carolina – Racial and ethnic composition Note: the US Census treats Hispanic/Latino as an ethnic category. This table excludes Latinos from the racial categories and assigns them to a separate category. Hispanics/Latinos may be of any race.
Race / Ethnicity (NH = Non-Hispanic)	Pop 2000	Pop 2010	Pop 2020	% 2000	% 2010	2020
White alone (NH)	178	119	97	52.51%	37.54%	36.47%
Black or African American alone (NH)	155	187	146	45.72%	58.99%	54.89%
Native American or Alaska Native alone (NH)	0	1	0	0.00%	0.32%	0.00%
Asian alone (NH)	1	0	0	0.29%	0.00%	0.00%
Native Hawaiian or Pacific Islander alone (NH)	0	0	0	0.00%	0.00%	0.00%
Other race alone (NH)	0	3	1	0.00%	0.95%	0.38%
Mixed race or Multiracial (NH)	1	1	6	0.29%	0.32%	2.26%
Hispanic or Latino (any race)	4	6	16	1.18%	1.89%	6.02%
Total	339	317	266	100.00%	100.00%	100.00%

As of the census of 2000, there were 339 people, 144 households, and 91 families residing in the town. The population density was 709.7 people per square mile (274.0 people/km^{2}). There were 162 housing units at an average density of 339.2 per square mile (131.0/km^{2}). The racial makeup of the town was 52.51% White, 45.72% African American, 0.29% Asian, 1.18% from other races, and 0.29% from two or more races. Hispanic or Latino of any race were 1.18% of the population.

There were 144 households, out of which 22.2% had children under the age of 18 living with them, 45.1% were married couples living together, 15.3% had a female householder with no husband present, and 36.8% were non-families. 36.1% of all households were made up of individuals, and 22.2% had someone living alone who was 65 years of age or older. The average household size was 2.35 and the average family size was 3.07.

In the town, the population was spread out, with 23.3% under the age of 18, 7.1% from 18 to 24, 20.1% from 25 to 44, 22.4% from 45 to 64, and 27.1% who were 65 years of age or older. The median age was 45 years. For every 100 females, there were 81.3 males. For every 100 females age 18 and over, there were 73.3 males.

The median income for a household in the town was $26,458, and the median income for a family was $33,500. Males had a median income of $23,750 versus $15,781 for females. The per capita income for the town was $15,302. About 18.2% of families and 26.5% of the population were below the poverty line, including 37.3% of those under age 18 and 32.7% of those age 65 or over.
