= National Register of Historic Places listings in Halifax County, North Carolina =

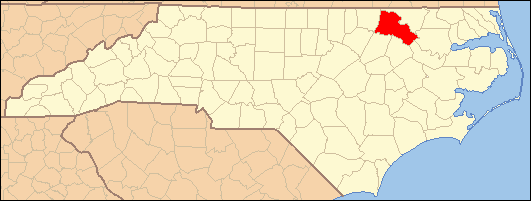

This list includes properties and districts listed on the National Register of Historic Places in Halifax County, North Carolina. Click the "Map of all coordinates" link to the right to view an online map of all properties and districts with latitude and longitude coordinates in the table below.

== Current listings ==
This National Park Service list is complete through NPS recent listings posted May 15, 2026.

	Name on the Register	Image	Date listed	Location	City or town	Description
1	Allen Grove School		May 31, 2018 (#100002518)	13763 NC 903; 36°20′45″N 77°37′13″W	Halifax	
2	Bell-Sherrod House		October 20, 1988 (#88002027)	207 SE Railroad St. 36°10′41″N 77°40′06″W	Enfield	
3	Bellamy's Mill	Bellamy's Mill	November 5, 1974 (#74001351)	Southwest of Enfield; 36°09′16″N 77°44′36″W	Enfield	
4	Bethesda Methodist Protestant Church		August 28, 2012 (#12000576)	30974 NC 561; 36°16′25″N 77°50′28″W	Brinkleyville	
5	Samuel Warren Branch House		June 8, 2021 (#100005750)	16212 NC 125; 36°13′29″N 77°33′24″W	Enfield	
6	Samuel Warren Branch House	Samuel Warren Branch House	June 14, 1982 (#82003464)	NC 481; 36°11′53″N 77°37′40″W	Enfield	
7	The Cellar	The Cellar	September 20, 1979 (#79003336)	404 Whitfield St. 36°11′04″N 77°40′21″W	Enfield	
8	Church of the Immaculate Conception and the Michael Ferrall Family Cemetery	Church of the Immaculate Conception and the Michael Ferrall Family Cemetery	June 4, 1997 (#97000533)	145 S. King St. 36°19′33″N 77°35′29″W	Halifax	
9	William R. Davie House	William R. Davie House	June 19, 1973 (#73001348)	Norman St. 36°19′52″N 77°35′31″W	Halifax	
10	Eagle Tavern	Eagle Tavern	April 24, 1973 (#73001349)	Main St. 36°19′47″N 77°35′20″W	Halifax	
11	Edmunds-Heptinstall House	Edmunds-Heptinstall House	March 12, 1979 (#79001718)	Northwest of Aurelian Springs on NC 1001; 36°22′16″N 77°50′12″W	Aurelian Springs	
12	Enfield Graded School	Enfield Graded School	January 8, 2009 (#08001290)	700 Branch St. 36°11′03″N 77°40′32″W	Enfield	
13	Enfield Historic District		August 16, 2021 (#100006809)	Roughly bounded by North Church, West Bryant, North Railroad, Liberty, North McDaniel, Whitaker, SW Railroad, Tucker and McGwigan Sts., East and West Burnette Aves. 36°10′53″N 77°40′04″W	Enfield	
14	Garner Farm	Garner Farm	June 7, 1990 (#90000826)	Junction of NC 125 and I-95; 36°23′58″N 77°38′54″W	Days Crossroads	
15	Grace Episcopal Church	Grace Episcopal Church	October 1, 1991 (#91001493)	404 Washington Ave. 36°25′31″N 77°35′57″W	Weldon	
16	Gray-Brownlow-Wilcox House		August 3, 1982 (#82003463)	South of Brinkleyville on NC 58; 36°15′34″N 77°51′46″W	Brinkleyville	
17	Halifax County Courthouse	Halifax County Courthouse	May 10, 1979 (#79001719)	Main St. 36°19′51″N 77°35′22″W	Halifax	part of the North Carolina County Courthouses Thematic Resource (TR)
18	Halifax County Home and Tubercular Hospital	Halifax County Home and Tubercular Hospital	December 10, 1985 (#85003338)	NC 903; 36°21′12″N 77°37′17″W	Halifax	
19	Halifax Historic District	Halifax Historic District	January 21, 1970 (#70000456)	Roughly bounded by St. David St., Owens House Drainage Ditch, the Roanoke River, and Magazine Spring Gut; also bounded by St. David, Montfort, Pittsylvania, Prussia, Church, Wilcox, Granville, and Ferguson Sts., and Highway 301; 36°19′56″N 77°35′16″W	Halifax	Second set of boundaries represents a boundary increase of January 14, 2011
20	The Hermitage	The Hermitage	May 29, 1975 (#75001274)	1 mile (1.6 km) west of Tillery off NC 481; 36°14′30″N 77°30′23″W	Tillery	
21	Hoffman-Bowers-Josey-Riddick House	Hoffman-Bowers-Josey-Riddick House	December 29, 1988 (#88003080)	1103 Church St. 36°07′47″N 77°25′25″W	Scotland Neck	
22	Andrew Jackson Elementary School		December 29, 2025 (#100012436)	17 St. Andrews Street; 36°19′54″N 77°35′16″W	Halifax	
23	Kehukee Primitive Baptist Church		February 4, 1994 (#94000023)	NC 1810 northeast side, just east of the junction with NC 125; 36°06′21″N 77°24′54″W	Scotland Neck	
24	Magnolia		April 17, 1980 (#80002842)	North of Scotland Neck on U.S. 258; 36°09′39″N 77°24′25″W	Scotland Neck	
25	Matthews Place		November 11, 1974 (#74001352)	Southeast of Hollister; 36°14′07″N 77°53′37″W	Hollister	
26	Myrtle Lawn		June 20, 1985 (#85001341)	SR 1003; 36°08′29″N 77°35′39″W	Enfield	
27	Oakland	Oakland	July 2, 1973 (#73001346)	At Airlie, NE corner of NC 4 and SR 1310; 36°20′14″N 77°53′05″W	Airlie	
28	James H. Parker House	James H. Parker House	June 6, 1994 (#94000545)	307 W. Franklin St. 36°11′02″N 77°40′06″W	Enfield	
29	Person's Ordinary	Person's Ordinary	April 24, 1973 (#73001379)	SR 1001; 36°25′35″N 77°54′43″W	Littleton	
30	Roanoke Canal	Roanoke Canal	October 8, 1976 (#76001328)	Roanoke Rapids Lake SE to Weldon; 36°27′01″N 77°37′54″W	Roanoke Rapids	
31	Roanoke Rapids Historic District	Roanoke Rapids Historic District	April 27, 1999 (#98001574)	Roughly bounded by Roanoke R.; Charlotte, Marshall, and Jefferson Sts.; CSX RR; and W. Thirteenth, Rapids, and Henry Sts; 36°27′38″N 77°39′23″W	Roanoke Rapids	
32	Roanoke Rapids Junior-Senior High School	Roanoke Rapids Junior-Senior High School	December 29, 1988 (#88003081)	800 Hamilton St. 36°27′32″N 77°39′15″W	Roanoke Rapids	
33	St. Alban's Episcopal Church	St. Alban's Episcopal Church	April 11, 2011 (#11000209)	300 Mosby Ave. 36°25′49″N 77°54′47″W	Littleton	
34	St. Mark's Episcopal Church	St. Mark's Episcopal Church	February 26, 1998 (#98000158)	204 S. King St. 36°19′34″N 77°35′31″W	Halifax	
35	Sally-Billy House	Sally-Billy House	February 8, 1973 (#73001350)	St. Andrews St. extended 36°19′49″N 77°35′07″W	Halifax	
36	Scotland Neck Historic District	Scotland Neck Historic District	January 31, 2003 (#02001743)	Roughly bounded by Church, Bryan, Cherry, Roanoke, and Fifth and Eighteenth Sts. 36°07′59″N 77°25′26″W	Scotland Neck	
37	Shell Castle	Shell Castle	April 11, 1973 (#73001347)	West of Enfield on NC 481; 36°11′10″N 77°42′12″W	Enfield	
38	Strawberry Hill		January 15, 1980 (#80002841)	East of Enfield on SR 1100; 36°09′28″N 77°35′51″W	Enfield	
39	Tillery-Fries House	Tillery-Fries House	July 8, 1992 (#92000830)	Southeast side of NC 481, 0.3 miles (0.48 km) north of the junction with NC 1117; 36°14′36″N 77°29′42″W	Tillery	
40	Trinity Church		November 25, 1980 (#80002843)	East side of US 258, 0.6 miles (0.97 km) south of the junction with SR 1118; 36°08′19″N 77°24′56″W	Scotland Neck	
41	Weldon Historic District	Weldon Historic District	May 23, 1996 (#96000565)	Roughly bounded by US 301, Woodlawn Ave., Cedar St., 8th and 9th Sts., and CSX RR tracks 36°25′28″N 77°35′51″W	Weldon	
42	Whitaker's Chapel	Whitaker's Chapel	December 8, 1997 (#97001522)	NC 1003; 0.4 miles (0.64 km) east of the junction of NC 1100 and NC 1003; 36°08′24″N 77°35′33″W	Enfield	
43	White Rock Plantation		February 14, 1979 (#79001720)	North of Hollister on NC 1315; 36°17′40″N 77°55′25″W	Hollister	
44	Woodstock		November 25, 1980 (#80002844)	West side of U.S. 258, 0.2 miles (0.32 km) south of the junction with SR 1118; 36°09′09″N 77°25′03″W	Scotland Neck	

== See also ==
- National Register of Historic Places listings in North Carolina
- List of National Historic Landmarks in North Carolina
