= Tillery =

Tillery may refer to:

== People with the surname ==
- Blake Tillery (born 1983), American politician
- Dale Tillery (born 1957), American judge, politician, and lawyer
- Dwight Tillery, American politician who served as mayor of Cincinnati from 1991 to 1993
- Elijah Tillery (born 1957), American boxer
- Gary Tillery (born 1947), American author
- Jerry Tillery (born 1996), American football player
- Ken Tillery (1958–2002), American murder victim
- Linda Tillery (born 1948), American singer

== Locations ==
- George W. Tillery House, historic house in Tennessee, USA
- Lake Tillery, a lake in North Carolina, USA
- Tillery, North Carolina
- Tillery-Fries House, historic house in North Carolina, USA
- Virginia Tillery Round Barn, historic house in Illinois, USA
