= Lawrence O'Bryan Branch =

American politician (1820–1862)

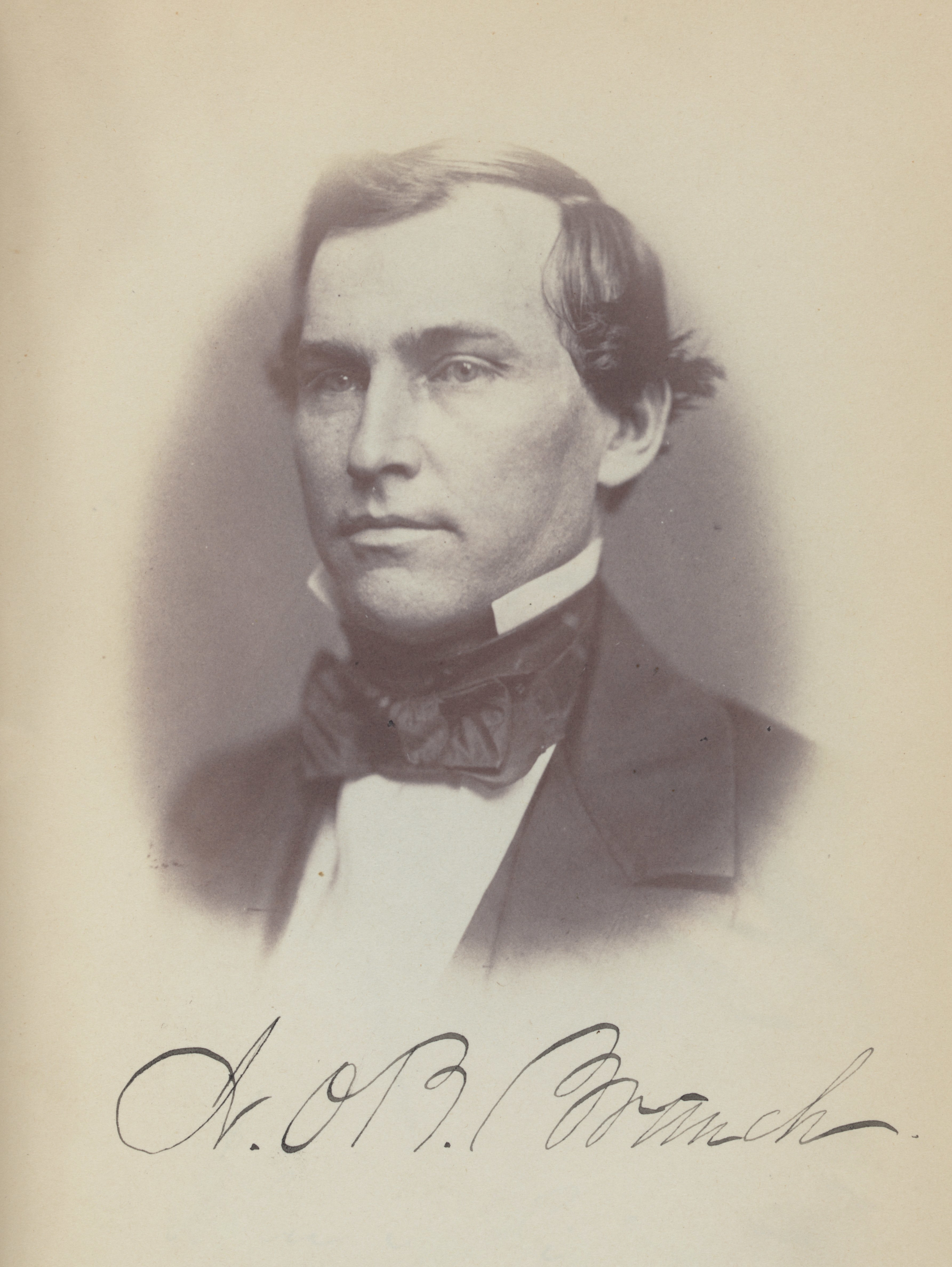
- Branch in 1859

Member of the U.S. House of Representatives from North Carolina's 4th district
- In office March 4, 1855 – March 3, 1861
- Preceded by: Sion Hart Rogers
- Succeeded by: John T. Deweese (1868)

Personal details
- Born: November 28, 1820 Enfield, North Carolina
- Died: September 17, 1862 (age 41) Sharpsburg, Maryland
- Party: Democratic
- Spouse: Nancy Haywood Blount (m. 1844)
- Children: 4
- Education: University of North Carolina at Chapel Hill; Princeton University

Military service
- Allegiance: Confederate States
- Branch/service: Confederate States Army
- Years of service: 1861–62
- Rank: Brigadier General (CSA)
- Battles/wars: Seminole Wars; American Civil War; Battle of New Bern; Peninsula Campaign; Northern Virginia Campaign; Maryland Campaign; Battle of Antietam †

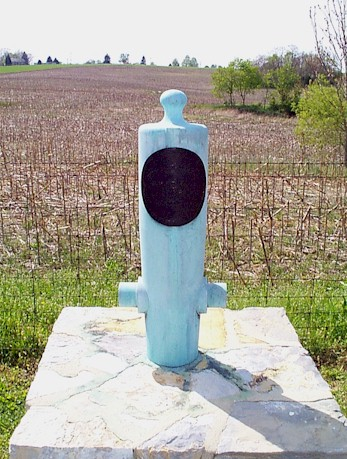
Memorial cannon placed at site of Branch's death (pictured)

Lawrence O'Bryan Branch (November 28, 1820 – September 17, 1862) was an American politician who served as a representative for North Carolina in the U.S. Congress and a Confederate brigadier general in the American Civil War. He was killed in action at the Battle of Antietam.

== Early life ==
Branch was born in Enfield, North Carolina to Major Joseph Branch and Susan Simpson O'Bryan Branch. His childhood home, The Cellar, was listed on the National Register of Historic Places in 1979. His family moved to Williamson County, Tennessee but his mother died when he was five and his father died in 1827. His uncle, Secretary of the Navy John Branch (then serving as Governor of North Carolina) assumed his guardianship and took him back to North Carolina. Branch moved to Washington City with his uncle when the latter took the position as Secretary of the Navy and he was tutored by Salmon P. Chase. He pursued a preparatory course under a private teacher in Washington, D.C., before going on to train at North Carolina's Bingham Military Academy. He also attended the University of North Carolina at Chapel Hill for a short time and, in 1838, graduated first in his class from Princeton College before going to study law in Nashville, Tennessee, where he also owned and edited a newspaper.

== Political career ==
In 1840, Branch moved to Tallahassee, Florida and was admitted to the bar to practice law by a special act of the legislature. Just one year later, he went to fight in the Seminole Wars. In 1844, he married Nancy Haywood Blount and they had four children. In 1852, he moved to Raleigh, North Carolina, where he continued to practice law and became president of the Raleigh & Gaston Railroad Co. He also served as an elector on the Franklin Pierce ticket in 1852. Branch was elected as a Democrat to the 34th, 35th, and 36th Congresses (March 4, 1855 - March 3, 1861) but was not a candidate for renomination in 1860. On December 29, 1859, he challenged Galusha Grow to a duel after the two exchanged insults on the House Floor. Both men and their seconds were arrested by District of Columbia police before the duel could take place. On December 2, 1860, he was appointed, (but declined), the position of Secretary of the Treasury by President James Buchanan.

== Civil War ==
Branch entered the Confederate Army, in May 1861, as a private in the Raleigh Rifles. Later that month he accepted the office of state quartermaster general, but resigned it for service in the field. In September he was elected colonel of the 33rd North Carolina. He was appointed brigadier general in January 1862. After the Battle of New Bern, his brigade was attached to A.P. Hill's Division of Stonewall Jackson's Corps. He was the senior brigadier general in Hill's division. Branch's brigade fought at the Battle of Hanover Courthouse, the Seven Days Battles, Cedar Mountain, Second Manassas, Chantilly, and Harper's Ferry

=== Antietam (Sharpsburg) ===
On September 17, 1862, he led his troops on a rapid march from Harpers Ferry to Sharpsburg, Maryland where the Battle of Antietam was raging. Branch arrived on the field around 2:30 PM, in time to help stop the Union advance, thus saving General Robert E. Lee's right flank from a crushing defeat. Soon after this victory, Branch stood talking with fellow brigadier generals Maxcy Gregg, Dorsey Pender, and James J. Archer, along with Hill and General Lee. A Federal sharpshooter, seeing the group, fired a shot that hit Branch in the right cheek and exited behind his left ear, killing him instantly. The bullet also wounded General Gregg in the thigh. Branch fell dead into the arms of a staff officer.

=== Dates of rank ===
- Private, May 1, 1861
- Colonel, September 1, 1861
- Brigadier General, January 16, 1862

== Legacy ==
A memorial cannon now stands at the location where Branch was killed. Five other memorial cannons are placed throughout the Antietam Battlefield marking the locations other commanders lost their lives. Branch is buried at the Old City Cemetery, Raleigh, North Carolina.

Author Armistead Maupin is Branch's great-great-grandson.

== See also ==
- List of American Civil War generals (Confederate)

== Notes ==
U.S. House of Representatives
Preceded by Sion H. Rogers	Member of the U.S. House of Representatives from North Carolina's 4th congressional district 1855–1861	Succeeded by John T. Deweese; 1868
