= Hilliard Hewlin =

State legislator in North Carolina (?–1919)

Hilliard Hewlin (?–April 1919) was a state legislator in North Carolina. He lived in Brinkleyville. He was African American. He was one of 19 African American Republicans elected to North Carolina's General Assembly in 1883, three of them state senators.

== See also ==
- African American officeholders from the end of the Civil War until before 1900
