= Frank B. Simpson =

American architect

Frank B. Simpson (1883–1966) was an American architect. A number of his works are listed on the U.S. National Register of Historic Places.

Works include (with attribution):

- One or more works in Apex Historic District, roughly bounded by N. Elm, N. Salem, Center, S. Salem, and W. Chatham Sts., Apex, North Carolina (Simpson, Frank), NRHP-listed
- Capital Club Building, built 1929, 16 W. Martin St., Raleigh, North Carolina (Simpson, Frank B.), NRHP-listed
- W. E. B. DuBois School, 536 Franklin St., Wake Forest, North Carolina (Simpson, Frank B.), NRHP-listed
- Enfield Graded School, 700 Branch St., Enfield, North Carolina (Simpson, Frank B.), NRHP-listed
- Marshall High School, Blannahassett Island. W. side Bridge St., Marshall, North Carolina (Simpson, Frank B.), NRHP-listed
