= Capital Club Building =

Historic building in North Carolina, US

- U.S. National Register of Historic Places
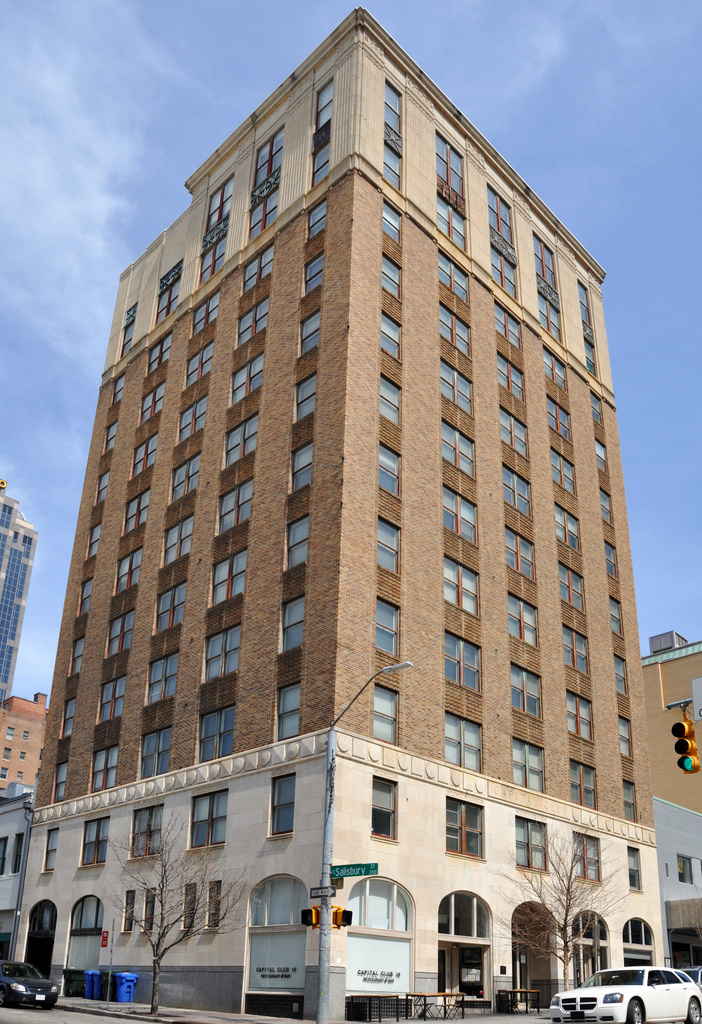

- Location within North Carolina Location within the United States
- Location: 16 W. Martin St., Raleigh, North Carolina
- Coordinates: 35°46′38″N 78°38′26″W
- Area: 0.1 acres (0.040 ha)
- Built: 1929
- Architect: Simpson, Frank B.
- Architectural style: Art Deco
- NRHP reference No.: 85003076
- Added to NRHP: December 5, 1985

The Capital Club Building is a historic office building located at 16 W. Martin St. in Raleigh, Wake County, North Carolina. It was designed by architect Frank B. Simpson and built in 1929 in the Art Deco style. It is a 12-story, steel-frame skyscraper in the classic base-shaft-capital form. It was built for the Capital Club, which was one of the oldest and most prominent organizations for men in the South.

It was listed on the National Register of Historic Places in 1985.
