= Ruth Bellamy =

American poet

- Born: Ruth Elizabeth Bellamy; November 5, 1906; Enfield, North Carolina
- Died: March 5, 1969 (aged 62); Durham, North Carolina
- Other name: Ruth Bellamy Brownwood
- Occupations: Writer, poet, dramatist, journalist, songwriter, college professor

Ruth Bellamy (November 5, 1906 – March 5, 1969), also known as Ruth Bellamy Brownwood, was an American writer, a journalist, dramatist, songwriter, actress, and poet, based in North Carolina and Japan.

== Early life and education ==
Ruth Elizabeth Bellamy was born in Enfield, North Carolina, the daughter of Phesington Sugg Bellamy and Lula Spruill Bellamy. Her father was a businessman. Her mother, known as "Mamee", was a well-known social figure in Rocky Mount in her later years.

Bellamy earned a bachelor's degree in dramatics at the University of North Carolina at Greensboro in 1928, and pursued further studies at Columbia University and the University of California.

== Career ==
Bellamy was head of the Spoken English and Expression department at High Point College, and taught dramatics; she was active in women's club activities at High Point. She worked at a travel agency in San Francisco. She taught English and wrote in Japan for five years, and in Hong Kong for two years. She edited two books by Kuni Sasaki, including Reluctant Bachelor (1962). She wrote poems, songs, plays, and articles, including a song titled "Blues Tokyo" that became popular in Japan.

Bellamy also acted through much of her life, performing in school as a girl, and active on stage and backstage with the Morningside Players in New York, the Civic Theater in Washington, D.C., and the Tokyo Amateur Dramatic Club.

== Personal life ==
Ruth Bellamy married, and had a son, David Owen Brownwood, born in Los Angeles in 1935. She married a screenwriter, William A. Golkopf, in 1946, in New York City; they divorced in 1948. She died at Duke University Hospital in Durham, North Carolina, in 1969, aged 62 years. Her papers are archived at East Carolina University.
