= Gray-Brownlow-Wilcox House =

Historic house in North Carolina, United States

- U.S. National Register of Historic Places
- Location within North Carolina Location within the United States
- Location: South of Brinkleyville on NC 58, near Brinkleyville, North Carolina
- Coordinates: 36°15′34″N 77°51′46″W
- Area: 28.2 acres (11.4 ha)
- Built: c.1820
- Architectural style: Federal
- NRHP reference No.: 82003463
- Added to NRHP: August 3, 1982

Gray-Brownlow-Wilcox House, also known as La Vallee, is a historic plantation house located at Aurelian Springs, Halifax County, North Carolina. It was built about 1820, and is a 2 1/2-story, three-bay, Federal-style frame dwelling. It has a temple-form and pedimented gable front facade. Located behind the house is a 1 1/2-story frame building that housed Brownlow's Female Academy from about 1833 to 1851.

It was listed on the National Register of Historic Places in 1982.
