= Myrtle Lawn =

Historic farm in North Carolina, United States

- U.S. National Register of Historic Places
- U.S. Historic district
- Location within North Carolina Location within the United States
- Location: SR 1003, near Enfield, North Carolina
- Coordinates: 36°08′29″N 77°35′39″W
- Area: 12 acres (4.9 ha)
- Built: c. 1816
- Architectural style: Federal
- NRHP reference No.: 85001341
- Added to NRHP: June 20, 1985

Myrtle Lawn is a historic plantation house and national historic district located near Enfield, Halifax County, North Carolina. It encompasses seven contributing buildings and one contributing site, the farm landscape. The house was built about 1816 and expanded about 1850. It is a two-story, five-bay, Federal style frame dwelling. Also on the property are the contributing carriage house (1840s), an office (1858), a slave house, a vegetable storage structure, a dairy, and other food and storage buildings.

It was listed on the National Register of Historic Places in 1985.
