= Matthews Place =

Historic house in North Carolina, United States

- U.S. National Register of Historic Places
- Location within North Carolina Location within the United States
- Location: Southeast of Hollister, near Hollister, North Carolina
- Coordinates: 36°14′07″N 77°53′37″W
- Area: 9 acres (3.6 ha)
- Built: c. 1800, c. 1847
- Architectural style: Greek Revival, Georgian
- NRHP reference No.: 74001352
- Added to NRHP: November 11, 1974

Matthews Place, also known as Ivey Hill, is a historic plantation house located near Hollister, Halifax County, North Carolina. It consists of two houses: a two-story, three-bay, Georgian-style frame dwelling dated to about 1800, attached to a two-story, three-bay, Greek Revival-style frame dwelling added about 1847. The houses are set a right angles to the other. The older house has a single-shoulder brick chimney. The Greek Revival house features a pedimented front entrance porch with simple fluted Doric order columns.

It was listed on the National Register of Historic Places in 1974.
