= Oakland (Airlie, North Carolina) =

Historic house in North Carolina, United States

- U.S. National Register of Historic Places
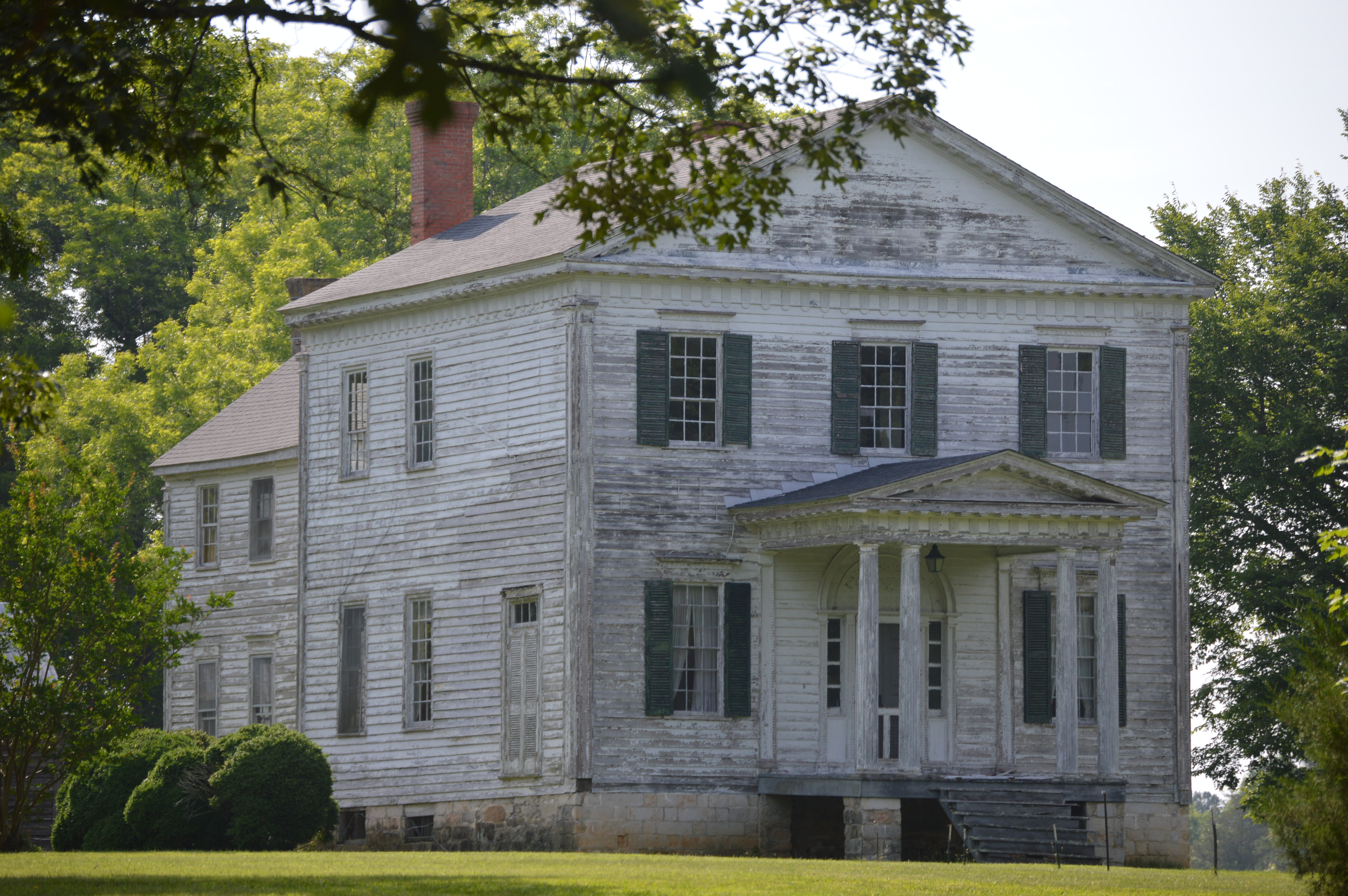
- Front and northern side

- Location within North Carolina Location within the United States
- Location: At Airlie, NE corner of NC 4 and SR 1310, Airlie, North Carolina
- Coordinates: 36°20′12″N 77°53′5″W
- Area: 9 acres (3.6 ha)
- Built: 1823
- Architectural style: Federal
- NRHP reference No.: 73001346
- Added to NRHP: July 2, 1973

Oakland is a historic plantation house located at Airlie, Halifax County, North Carolina. It was built in 1823, and is a two-story, three bay by three bay, Federal-style frame dwelling. It has a temple-form and pedimented gable front facade.

It was listed on the National Register of Historic Places in 1973.

== History ==
Despite Oakland being under Thorne Family ownership for most of its existence, the property was sold to and used by Mark Harwell Pettway for at least 16 years. Page 6 of Oakland's National Register of Historic Places "nominee form" states: "In 1836, Mrs Mary K. Williams sold to Mark Petway for $4,500 the tract: "known by the name of Oakland Plantation," save the burial ground at the end of the garden now enclosed with rock", which was retained by her as a burial ground".

Mark H. Pettway (born about 1792, per U.S. 1850 census) was a planter born in Mecklenburg County, Virginia and raised in Halifax County, NC. The 1830 census recorded M.H. Pettway in the "2nd Regiment" of Halifax County, NC with a total of 89 enslaved persons. The 1840 census recorded Pettway in Halifax County, NC with a total of 36 enslaved persons.

M.H. Pettway brought, sold and used enslaved persons who worked on Oakland Plantation, as debt collateral many times throughout his career, as a career man in the elite "planter society" of Virginia and the Carolinas. Oakland plantation is referenced in an 1848 Deed of Trust (recorded in Halifax County Register of Deeds in Book 32, Page 423), where Pettway used 54 enslaved African-Americans, as part of collateral for debts secured by John B. Williams of Warren County, NC for $1. The Deed of Trust reads: "These presents that Mark H. Pettway for and in consideration of the sum of one dollar..paid by John B. Williams of Warren County, NC at therefore the signing and sealing of these presents..is hearby acknowledged..have granted, bargained, sold..unto John B. Williams..two tracts or parcels of lands and premises lying and being in Halifax County, NC. The one tract lying on the Rail Road to Weldon..the other tract of land called Oakland where said Pettway did divide estimated at 700 acres together with..crop of corn, stock of..cattle..plantation utensils..together with the following negro slaves (which are now on the Oakland plantation) namly Hannah, Chany, John, Jim, Susan, Ally, Wyatt, Lydia, Ellen, Barbara, Suny, Sallyann, Jane, Fanny, Amanda, George, Airy, Sidney, William, Louisa, Louvenia, Robert, Daniel, Louisa, Patsey, Allen, Emiline, Mariah, Penny, Cromwell, Mary, Laing, Booker, Caroline, Antoinette, Moses, Tinnah, Isaac, David, Sally Anne, Isaiah, Austin, Zackariah, Charlotte, Pleasant, Tempey, Elizabeth (Pleasant's child), Susan, Booker, Joe, Polly, Matilda, Mary, Worley and Primus". M.H Pettway is named in over 50 legally binding agreements regarding enslaved persons, including bills of sale and deeds of trusts, recorded in Halifax county.

By 1845, Pettway moved to Gee's Bend, Alabama to take possession of a plantation he acquired from his relatives, who were $29,000 in debt to him; Pettway's move to Alabama was stoked by an 8-year legal battle, that reached Alabama's Supreme Court. He left Halifax, NC and traveled to Alabama by caravan, with about 100 enslaved persons who walked the entire way. By September 1852, Pettway placed ads in a North Carolina newspaper, for his plantation known as "Oakland". The advertisement describes Oakland plantation via the following excerpt: "..the tract of Land whereen said Pettway lately resided, called OAKLAND. It has on it a good Dwelling, with all necessary out Houses, good Garden, Orchard of Apples, Peaches, and other select Fruit trees, good spring water, and is a healthy and pleasant situation, containing 700 acres of land, 70 or 100 acres good Low Grounds on Butter Wood Creek lying in the upper part of Halifax County, near the Warren line - adjoining the land of Mrs. Throne and others.."

According to Oakland's NRHP nominee form, the property was sold back to the Throne Family in 1856: "No more deeds were found referring to the property until 1856, when W. H. Thorne (same family) purchased for $3,000 a tract of about 700 acres "commonly known as Oakland" at auction from the estate of Dr. John D. Hill. Oakland has remained in the Thorne family since that time and is kept in good condition."

== Present Day ==
As of December 2025, the Oakland house and its acreage appears to be in an absentee state. Google Earth images has captured the Oakland house; From street view, the house is visibly degraded. Local Halifax County residents have also made claims on social media, that the property is abandoned and the current owner (Throne family), lives in a city that is out-of-state. According to Halifax County's register of deeds, the owner of the Oakland property, is a resident of a city outside the State of North Carolina.
