= Enfield Graded School =

Historic school building in North Carolina, United States

- U.S. National Register of Historic Places
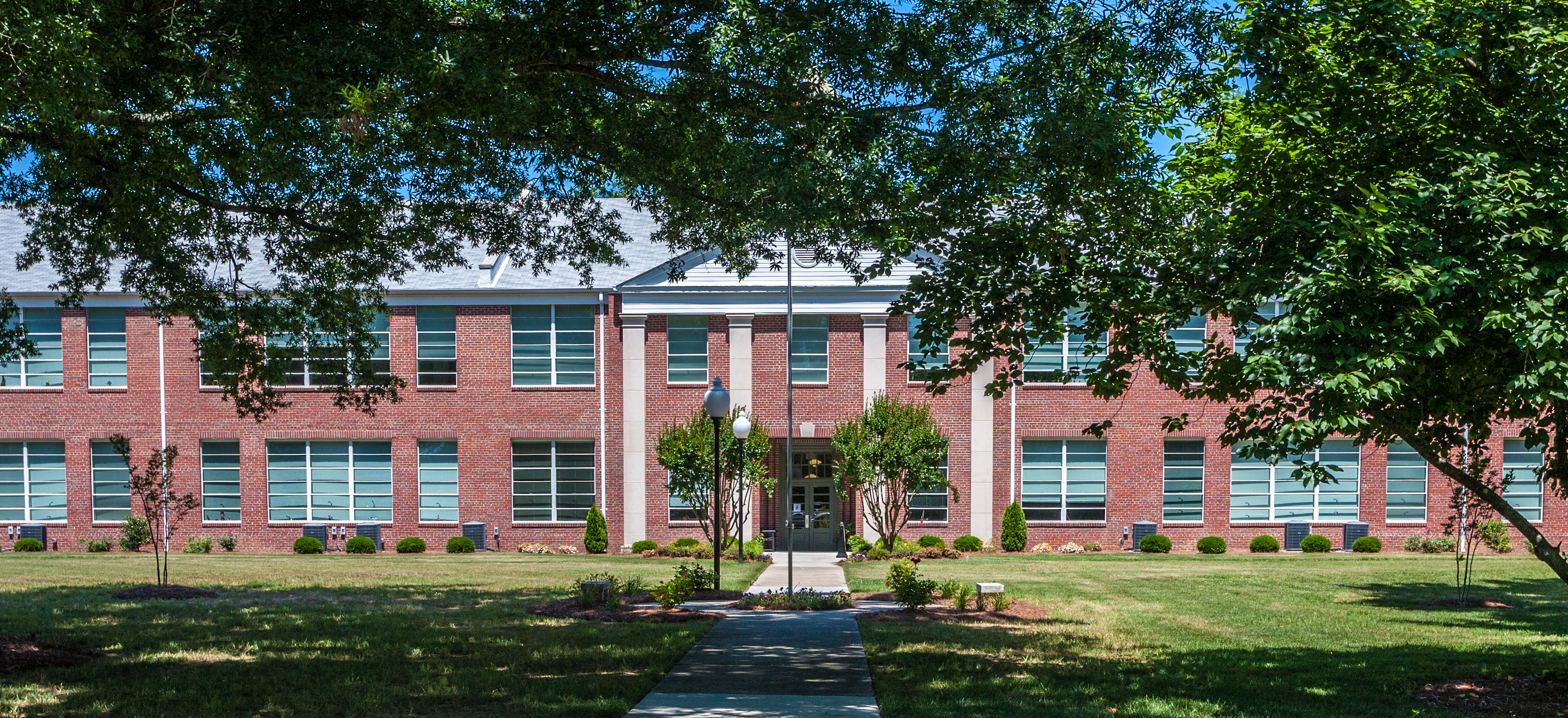
- Enfield Graded School, June 2013

- Location within North Carolina Location within the United States
- Location: 700 Branch St., Enfield, North Carolina
- Coordinates: 36°11′03″N 77°40′32″W
- Area: 15 acres (6.1 ha)
- Built: 1950
- Architect: Simpson, Frank B.; Savage, Eugene
- Architectural style: Colonial Revival
- NRHP reference No.: 08001290
- Added to NRHP: January 8, 2009

Enfield Graded School, also known as Enfield Middle School, is a historic school building located at Enfield, Halifax County, North Carolina. It was designed by architect Frank B. Simpson and built in 1950. It is a two-story, Colonial Revival-style brick building. The H-shaped building consists of a large two-story central block, projecting two-story flanking wings, a one-story auditorium, and a one-story kitchen addition. Also on the property are the contributing brick gymnasium (1951), concrete block agricultural building (1952), and adjacent athletic fields.

It was listed on the National Register of Historic Places in 2009. Currently this facility is home to 36 senior apartment units.
