= Strawberry Hill (Enfield, North Carolina) =

Historic house in North Carolina, United States

- U.S. National Register of Historic Places
- Location within North Carolina Location within the United States
- Location: East of Enfield on SR 1100, near Enfield, North Carolina
- Coordinates: 36°09′28″N 77°35′51″W
- Area: 95 acres (38 ha)
- Built: 1792, 1836
- NRHP reference No.: 80002841
- Added to NRHP: January 15, 1980

Strawberry Hill is a historic plantation house located near Enfield, Halifax County, North Carolina. It was built in 1792, and is a two-story, three-bay, vernacular frame dwelling with 19th century rear additions. It has double-shouldered brick exterior end chimneys and a gable roof.

It was listed on the National Register of Historic Places in 1980.
