= Hoffman-Bowers-Josey-Riddick House =

Historic house in North Carolina, United States

- U.S. National Register of Historic Places
- U.S. Historic district – Contributing property
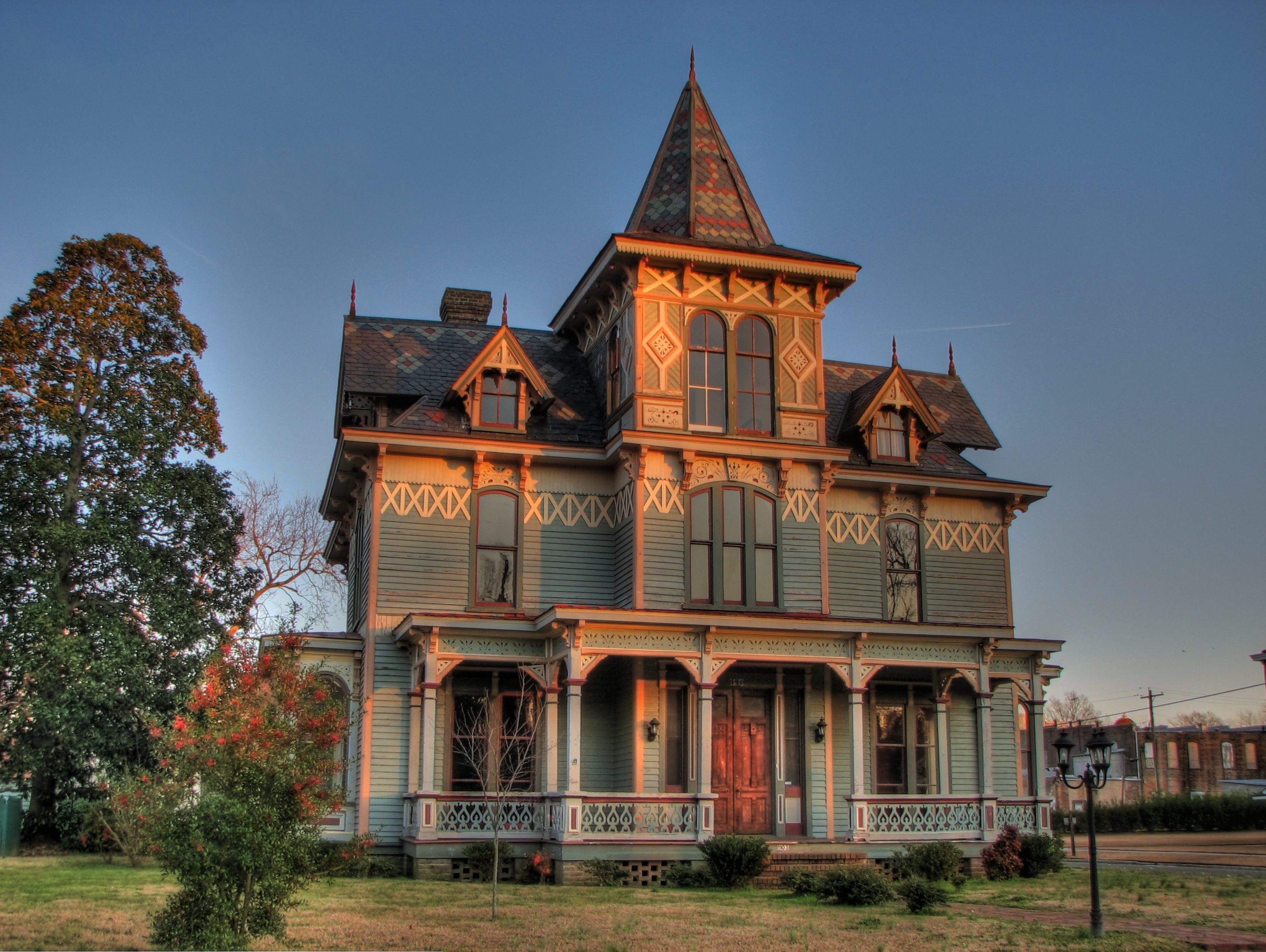

- Location within North Carolina Location within the United States
- Location: 1103 Church St., Scotland Neck, North Carolina
- Coordinates: 36°7′47″N 77°25′25″W
- Area: 0.5 acres (0.20 ha)
- Built: 1883
- Built by: H. G. Jones
- Architectural style: Stick/eastlake
- NRHP reference No.: 88003080
- Added to NRHP: December 29, 1988

Hoffman-Bowers-Josey-Riddick House is a historic home located at Scotland Neck, Halifax County, North Carolina. It was built in 1883, and is a 2 1/2-story, rectangular, frame dwelling with Stick Style / Eastlake movement design elements. It has a complex polychromed, slate roof gable roof; three-story central tower with hexagonal roof; and one-story rear ell. It features a front porch with sawn balustrade.

It was listed on the National Register of Historic Places in 1988. It is located in the Scotland Neck Historic District.
