= Murder of Ken Tillery =

2002 murder in Texas

Ken Tillery
- Born: 1958; USA
- Died: January 19, 2002 (aged 43–44); Jasper, Texas, U.S.

Ken Tillery of Jasper, Texas, was murdered on January 19, 2002. On the night of his murder, Tillery, a white man, was outside of a suspected crackhouse when he was approached by three black males, Darrell Gilbert, Blake Little, and Anthony Holmes, and offered a ride in their vehicle, an early 1980s model Oldsmobile Cutlass. Tillery accepted, but an argument later developed over the gas money he agreed to pay. Tillery expected to pay only $5, but the men demanded $50. When the car passed Tillery's home and arrived at a gas station, he jumped out and tried to flee, but was caught and beaten by the three men. Tillery's attackers ran him over.

The FBI investigated and ruled out federal hate crime charges. Jasper County Sheriff Billy Rowles concluded, "It was just about drugs and money."

Holmes pleaded guilty to aggravated assault and received a 15-year term. Little was convicted of murder and sentenced to 70 years incarceration. Both are still serving their sentences. Gilbert was sentenced to 20 years in prison. On February 14, 2005, Gilbert was murdered in the Texas Department of Criminal Justice Stiles Unit by fellow inmate Reagan Caldwell.
