= Bellamy's Mill =

- U.S. National Register of Historic Places
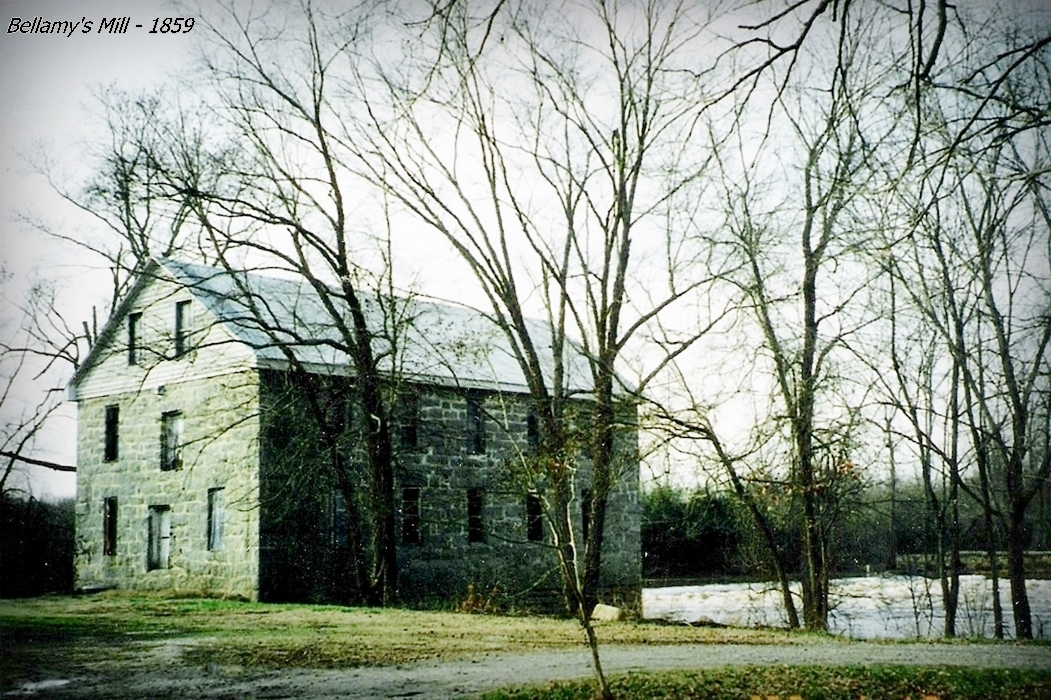

- Location within North Carolina Location within the United States
- Location: Southwest of Enfield, near Enfield, North Carolina
- Coordinates: 36°09′16″N 77°44′36″W
- Area: 5 acres (2.0 ha)
- NRHP reference No.: 74001351
- Added to NRHP: November 5, 1974

Bellamy's Mill is a historic grist mill located near Enfield, Halifax County, North Carolina and Nash County, North Carolina. It was built about 1859, and is a three-story building constructed of cut stone blocks. It is two bays wide by three bays deep and has a gable roof. Associated with the mill are a dam and support structures, also built of stone blocks.

It was listed on the National Register of Historic Places in 1974.
