= Edmunds-Heptinstall House =

Historic house in North Carolina, United States

- U.S. National Register of Historic Places
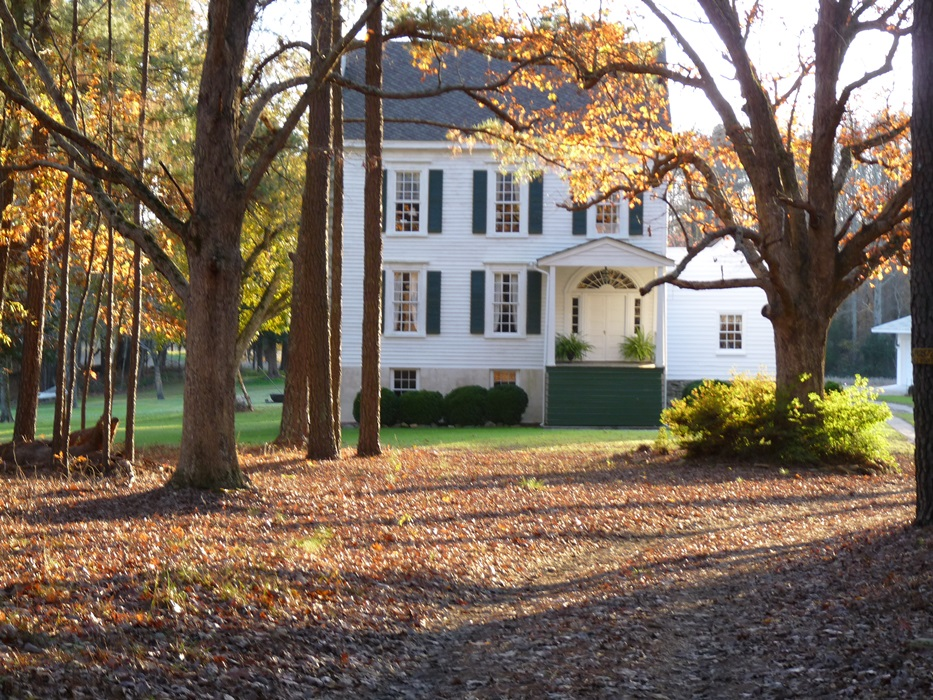

- Location within North Carolina Location within the United States
- Location: Northwest of Aurelian Springs on NC 1001, near Aurelian Springs, North Carolina
- Coordinates: 36°22′16″N 77°50′12″W
- Area: 174.1 acres (70.5 ha)
- Built: 1830s to 1840s
- Architectural style: Greek Revival, Federal
- NRHP reference No.: 79001718
- Added to NRHP: March 12, 1979

Edmunds-Heptinstall House is a historic plantation house located near Aurelian Springs, Halifax County, North Carolina. It dates to the 1830s or 1840s, and is a tall two-story, transitional Federal / Greek Revival-style frame dwelling. It measures 35 feet by 35 feet, rests on a stuccoed masonry foundation, side gable roof, two tall single-shoulder stone chimneys, and a side-hall plan.

It was listed on the National Register of Historic Places in 1979.
