= Scotland Neck Historic District =

Historic district in North Carolina, United States

- U.S. National Register of Historic Places
- U.S. Historic district
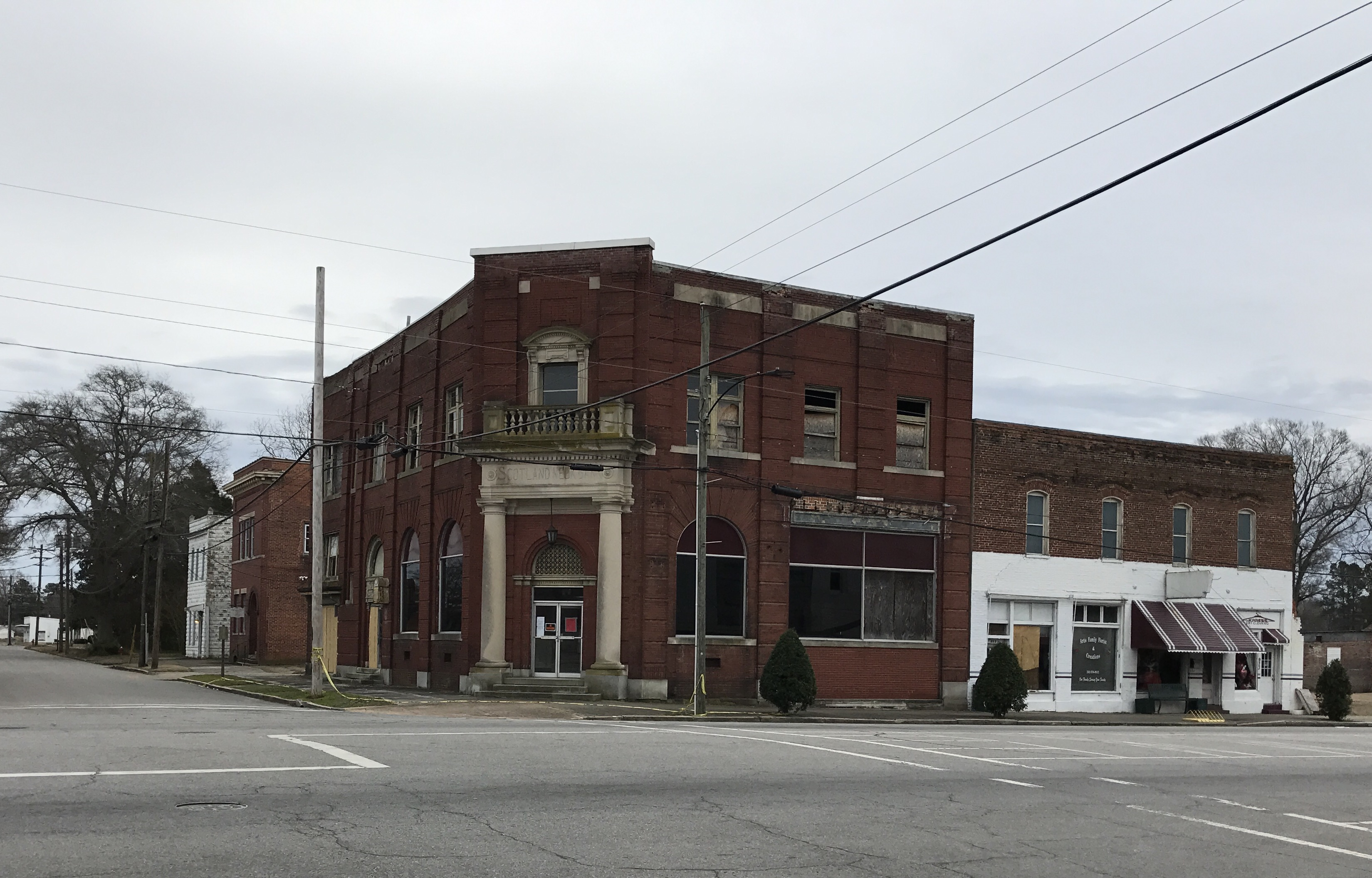
- Scotland Neck Bank, a building included in the historic district

- Location within North Carolina Location within the United States
- Location: Roughly bounded by Church, Bryan, Cherry, Roanoke, and Fifth and Eighteenth Sts., Scotland Neck, North Carolina
- Coordinates: 36°7′59″N 77°25′26″W
- Area: 155 acres (63 ha)
- Built: 1827
- Architectural style: Greek Revival, Gothic Revival
- NRHP reference No.: 02001743
- Added to NRHP: January 31, 2003

Scotland Neck Historic District is a national historic district located at Scotland Neck, Halifax County, North Carolina. It encompasses 249 contributing buildings and 1 contributing object in the central business district and surrounding residential sections of the town of Scotland Neck. The district includes notable examples of Greek Revival and Gothic Revival style architecture. Located in the district is the separately listed Hoffman-Bowers-Josey-Riddick House. Other notable buildings include the Fenner-Shields-Lamb House (1827); D. Edmondson Building (c. 1882), E. T. Whitehead drug store (c. 1901); Scotland Neck Bank (1914); Baptist Church (1917); Trinity Episcopal Church (1924); and town hall and fire station (1939), brick gymnasium and vocational building (1940), and one-story, elongated brick multiple housing unit (1943) built by the Works Progress Administration. The latter building was utilized as a prisoner-of-war camp during World War II.

It was listed on the National Register of Historic Places in 2003.
