= James H. Parker House =

Historic house in North Carolina, United States

- U.S. National Register of Historic Places
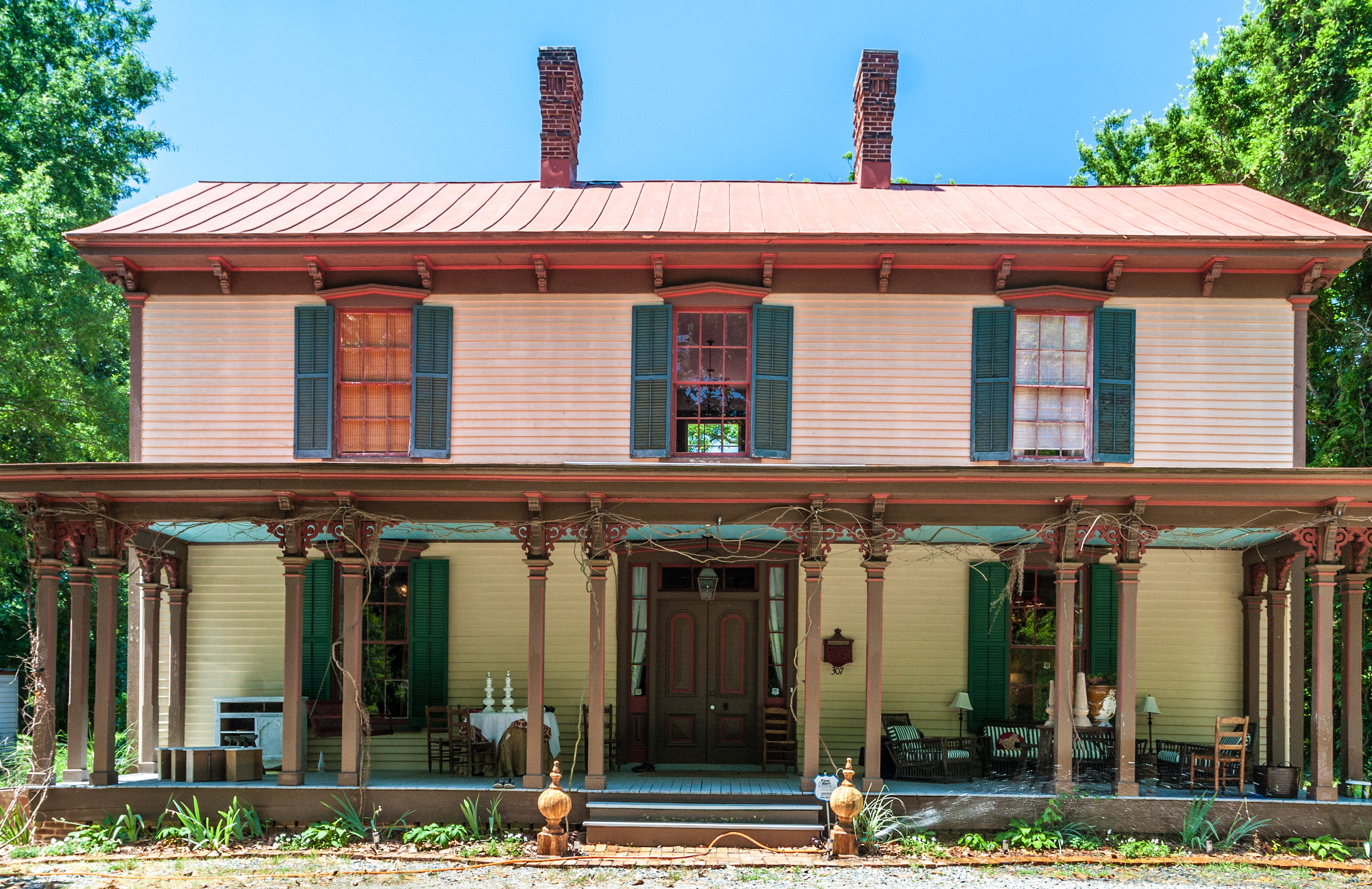
- James H. Parker House, June 2013

- Location within North Carolina Location within the United States
- Location: 307 W. Franklin St., Enfield, North Carolina
- Coordinates: 36°11′2″N 77°40′6″W
- Area: less than one acre
- Built: 1882
- Architectural style: Italianate
- NRHP reference No.: 94000545
- Added to NRHP: June 6, 1994

James H. Parker House is a historic home located at Enfield, Halifax County, North Carolina. It was built in 1882, and is a two-story, three-bay, Italianate-style frame dwelling. It has a side-gable roof with overhanging eaves and features a one-story porch with a low-hipped roof supported by paired (tripled at the corners) chamfered columns topped by built-up and scroll-sawn brackets. Also on the property is a contributing smokehouse (c. 1855, 1882).

It was listed on the National Register of Historic Places in 1994.
