= Scotland Neck, North Carolina =

- Town
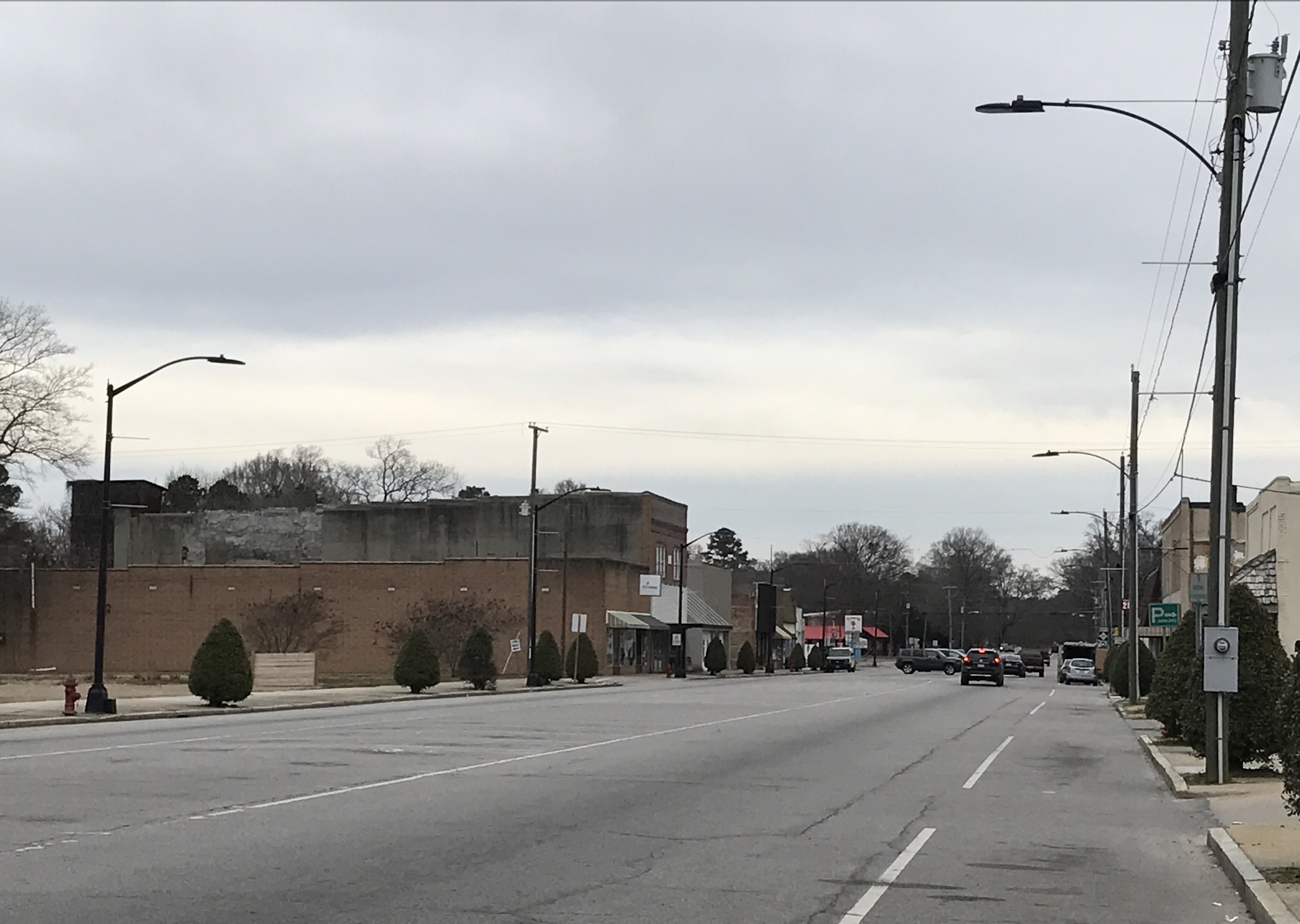
- US 258-NC 903 run through Downtown Scotland Neck.

- Seal

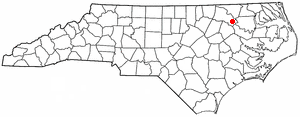
- Location of Scotland Neck, North Carolina
- Coordinates: 36°07′51″N 77°25′17″W
- Country: United States
- State: North Carolina
- County: Halifax
- Established: 1867

Area
  - Total: 1.19 sq mi (3.08 km^{2})
  - Land: 1.19 sq mi (3.08 km^{2})
  - Water: 0 sq mi (0.00 km^{2})
- Elevation: 102 ft (31 m)

Population (2020)
  - Total: 1,640
  - Density: 1,380.6/sq mi (533.06/km^{2})
- Time zone: UTC-5 (Eastern (EST))
  - Summer (DST): UTC-4 (EDT)
- ZIP code: 27874
- Area code: 252
- FIPS code: 37-59780
- GNIS feature ID: 2407299
- Website: www.townofscotlandneck.com

Scotland Neck is a town in Halifax County, North Carolina, United States. As of the 2020 census, Scotland Neck had a population of 1,640. It is part of the Roanoke Rapids, North Carolina Micropolitan Statistical Area.

== History ==
The Hoffman-Bowers-Josey-Riddick House, Kehukee Primitive Baptist Church, Magnolia, Scotland Neck Historic District, Trinity Church, and Woodstock are listed on the National Register of Historic Places. Vine Hill Academy located in Scotland Neck, was a private school attended by many prominent historical figures.

Scotland Neck recruited and self supplied an independent volunteer company, 'the Scotland Neck Mounted Riflemen' in 1859. At the opening of the Civil War in 1861, the company was mustered into the Army of the Confederate States, as Company G, 3rd North Carolina Cavalry, 41st Regiment. A brief pamphlet of the unit's experience during the war was written by the son of one of the officers serving in the company.

== Geography ==
According to the United States Census Bureau, the town has a total area of 1.2 square miles (3.1 km^{2}), all land.

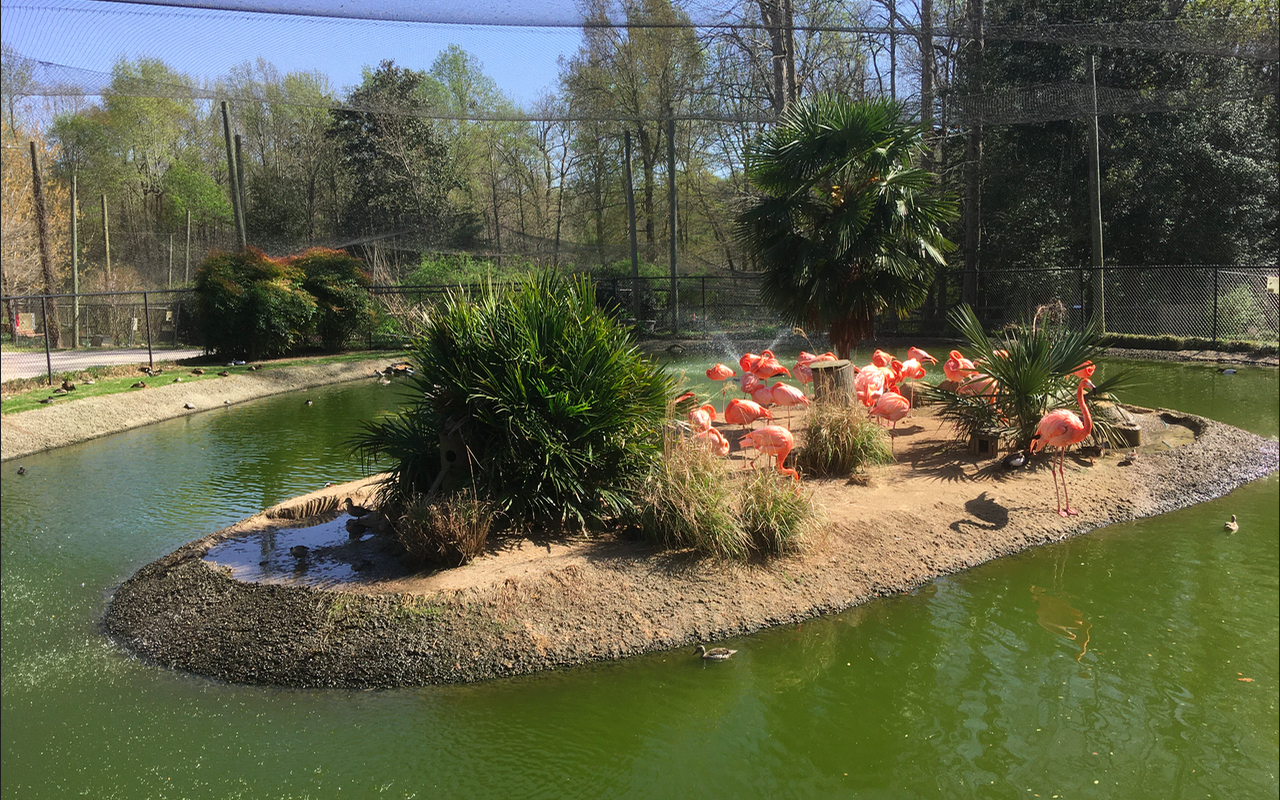
Sylvan Heights Bird Park

== Demographics ==
Historical population
Census	Pop.	Note	%±
1880	482		—
1890	778		61.4%
1900	1,348		73.3%
1910	1,726		28.0%
1920	2,061		19.4%
1930	2,339		13.5%
1940	2,559		9.4%
1950	2,730		6.7%
1960	2,974		8.9%
1970	2,869		−3.5%
1980	2,834		−1.2%
1990	2,575		−9.1%
2000	2,362		−8.3%
2010	2,059		−12.8%
2020	1,640		−20.3%
U.S. Decennial Census

=== Racial and ethnic composition ===
Scotland Neck town, North Carolina – Racial and ethnic composition Note: the US Census treats Hispanic/Latino as an ethnic category. This table excludes Latinos from the racial categories and assigns them to a separate category. Hispanics/Latinos may be of any race.
Race / Ethnicity (NH = Non-Hispanic)	Pop 2000	Pop 2010	Pop 2020	% 2000	% 2010	% 2020
White alone (NH)	697	620	445	29.51%	30.11%	27.13%
Black or African American alone (NH)	1,596	1,399	1,108	67.57%	67.95%	67.56%
Native American or Alaska Native alone (NH)	3	0	2	0.13%	0.00%	0.12%
Asian alone (NH)	0	3	6	0.00%	0.15%	0.37%
Native Hawaiian or Pacific Islander alone (NH)	0	0	0	0.00%	0.00%	0.00%
Other race alone (NH)	4	1	9	0.17%	0.05%	0.55%
Mixed race or Multiracial (NH)	13	4	24	0.55%	0.19%	1.46%
Hispanic or Latino (any race)	49	32	46	2.07%	1.55%	2.80%
Total	2,362	2,059	1,640	100.00%	100.00%	100.00%

=== 2020 census ===
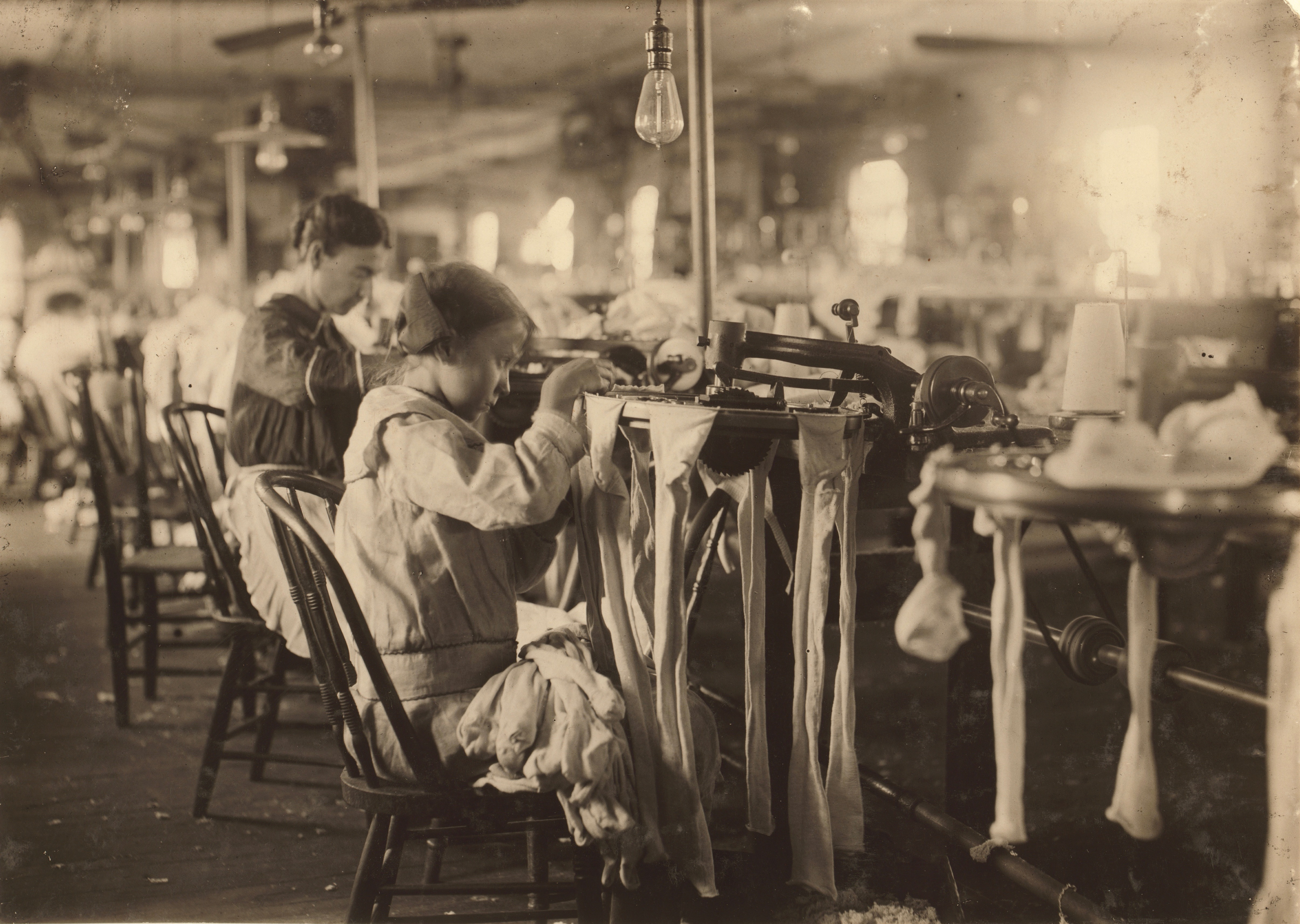
Child labor in Scotland Neck, 1914. Photo by Lewis Hine.

As of the 2020 United States census, there were 1,640 people, 611 households, and 327 families residing in the town.

=== 2000 census ===
According to the census of 2000, there were 2,362 people, 987 households, and 611 families residing in the town. The population density was 1,935.1 people per square mile (747.1 people/km^{2}). There were 1,097 housing units at an average density of 898.7 per square mile (347.0/km^{2}). The racial makeup of the town was 29.85% White, 68.04% African American, 0.17% Native American, 1.10% from other races, and 0.85% from two or more races. Hispanic or Latino of any race were 2.07% of the population.

There were 987 households, out of which 24.7% had children under the age of 18 living with them, 31.4% were married couples living together, 24.4% had a female householder with no husband present, and 38.0% were non-families. 35.9% of all households were made up of individuals, and 17.9% had someone living alone who was 65 years of age or older. The average household size was 2.39 and the average family size was 3.11.

In the town, the population was spread out, with 27.1% under the age of 18, 8.1% from 18 to 24, 23.3% from 25 to 44, 21.7% from 45 to 64, and 19.8% who were 65 years of age or older. The median age was 39 years. For every 100 females, there were 81.1 males. For every 100 females age 18 and over, there were 71.6 males.

The median income for a household in the town was $21,094, and the median income for a family was $27,115. Males had a median income of $24,519 versus $17,328 for females. The per capita income for the town was $12,982. About 24.4% of families and 31.9% of the population were below the poverty line, including 42.8% of those under age 18 and 28.2% of those age 65 or over.

== Notable people ==
- John Eaton, politician and diplomat
- John D. Hall, politician and radio station owner
- Claude Kitchin, politician
- Alice McGill, children's writer and storyteller
- Tom Umphlett, MLB outfielder
