= Whitaker's Chapel =

Historic chapel in Enfield, North Carolina, US

- U.S. National Register of Historic Places
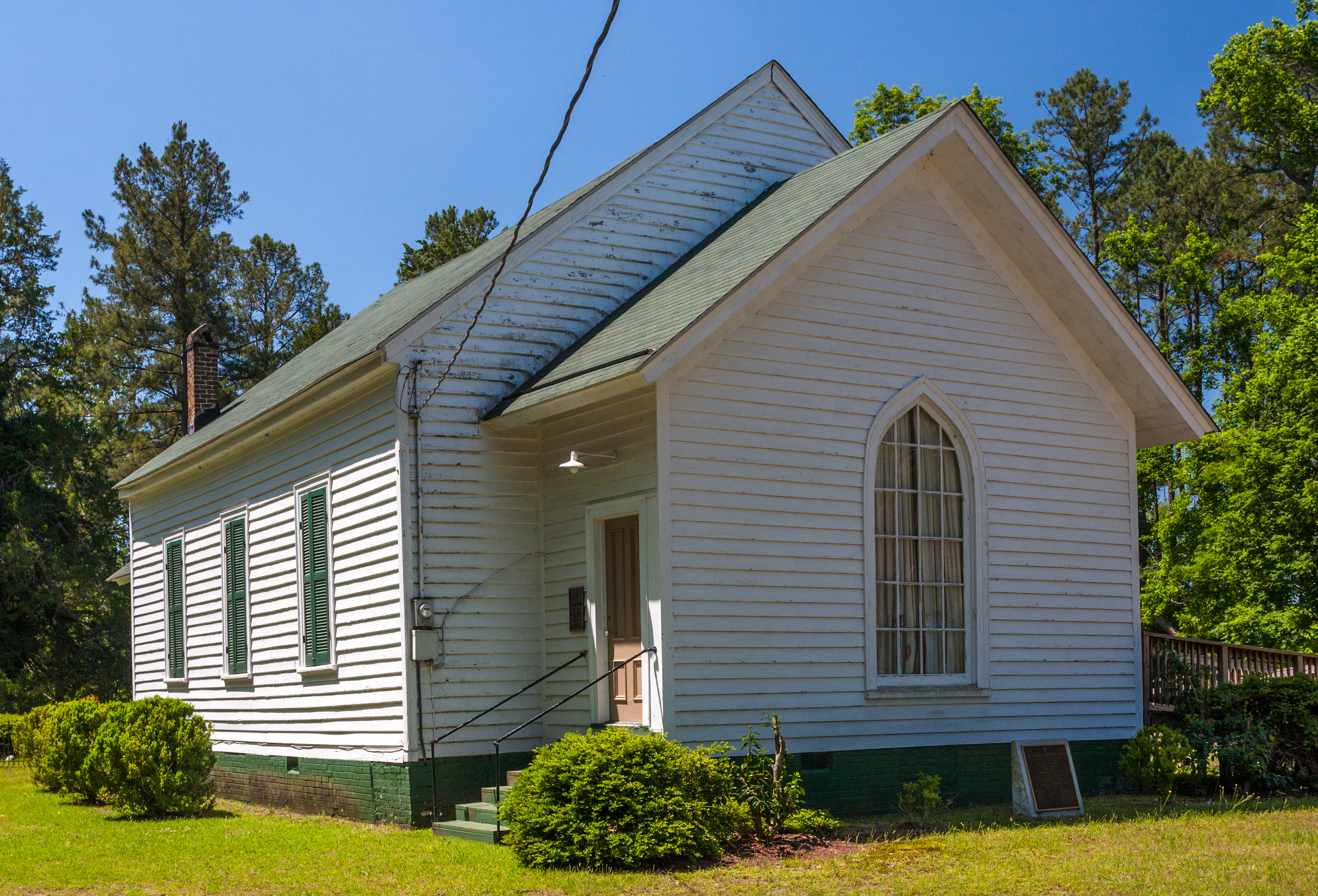
- Historical marker for Whitaker's Chapel, Enfield, NC

- Location within North Carolina Location within the United States
- Location: NC 1003; 0.4 miles (0.64 km) east of the junction of NC 1100 and NC 1003, Enfield, North Carolina
- Coordinates: 36°8′24″N 77°35′33″W
- Area: 4 acres (1.6 ha)
- Built: 1828
- Architectural style: Late Gothic Revival, Greek Revival, Federal
- NRHP reference No.: 97001522
- Added to NRHP: December 08, 1997

Whitaker's Chapel is a historic chapel in Enfield, Halifax County, North Carolina. The chapel was originally an Anglican chapel, but was later used by Methodists. It was built about 1828, and is a transitional Federal / Greek Revival style frame building. The original section measures 26 feet by 36 feet. It was moved to its present site in 1880–1881, and a vestibule and chancel extension were added sometime after. The chapel was restored in 1965. The adjacent church cemetery was established in the 1850s.

It was listed on the National Register of Historic Places in 1997.

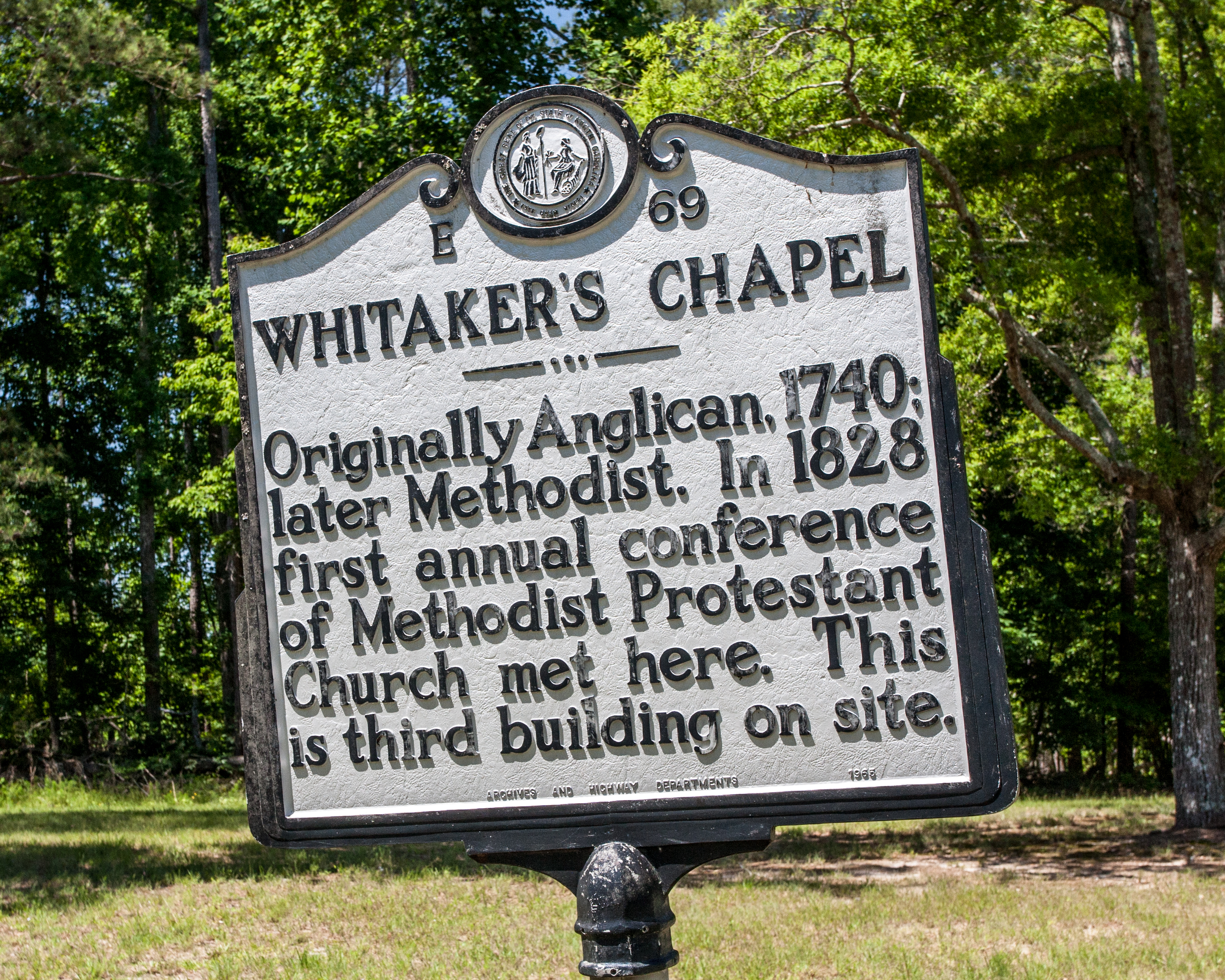
Historical marker
