= Dale Tillery =

American judge, politician, and lawyer

Judge of the 134th Texas District Court for Dallas County
- Incumbent
- Assumed office 2011

Member of the Texas House of Representatives from the 105th district
- In office 1995–2003
- Preceded by: Al Granoff
- Succeeded by: Linda Harper-Brown

Personal details
- Born: February 17, 1957 (age 69) Dallas County, Texas
- Party: Democratic
- Spouse: Melanie
- Education: University of North Texas (B.A.); Texas Tech University (J.D.)
- Profession: Attorney

Dale B. Tillery (born February 17, 1957) is an American judge, politician, and lawyer and currently serves as the judge of the 134th Judicial District Court in Dallas County. He was first elected to the bench in 2010.

== Political career ==
Tillery was elected to the Texas House of Representatives in 1994 to replace the retiring Al Granoff. During his freshman term, his interests were focused on juvenile crime and public education; he passed legislation to help police departments crack down on gang activity. His interests also included pensions and investments; during his final term, he served as chairman on the House Committee on Pensions and Investments. As chairman, he sponsored legislation to tap a then-$6.5 billion surplus in the state teachers’ pension fund to increase pensions for retired teachers by up to 10 percent. The legislation increased the retirement multiplier to achieve the increases. Supporters of the legislation noted that it was necessary to increase the retirement “maintain[] a rough parity” between older and newer retirees because “older retirees … worked for extremely low wages in the 1960s or 1970s[.]” Teacher pensions have not been adjusted for inflation since 2001.

Tillery authored the 2001 amendment to the Texas Constitution to "require the governor to call a special legislative session to appoint presidential electors if the governor thought that a final determination of the Texas vote wouldn't be made before the federal deadline for certifying electors.” The amendment was authored in response to the uncertainty over the counting of Florida's electoral votes in the 2000 Presidential election, including whether the state legislature was authorized to appoint a slate of electors if the counting was not completed before the deadline for the electors to meet. Tillery said his measure resolved that legal uncertainty and “ensure[d] that Texans will appoint Texas presidential electors, not the United States Congress." The amendment was adopted by 62 percent of Texas voters voting in the constitutional amendments election.

He did not seek re-election in 2002; the GOP-led Legislative Redistricting Board paired him with fellow Democrat Terri Hodge.

== Judicial career ==
After serving in the Legislature, Tillery practice law privately in Dallas. In 2010, he won the Democratic nomination for judge of the 134th District Court for Dallas County in a runoff over former judge David Kelton. He won the general election that fall and took office Jan. 1, 2011.

As a judge, Tillery has presided over several high-profile cases in Dallas County. He was the judge presiding in the lawsuit filed by former exotic dancer Jana Weckerly against Dallas Cowboys owner Jerry Jones that ended in a sealed settlement. He also presided over the multi-million dollar litigation between a Dallas hedge fund and Credit Suisse over the bankrupt Lake Las Vegas development; after a jury found Credit Suisse fraudulently inflated property appraisals in the development and awarded the hedge fund $40 million, Tillery ordered the financial services company to pay an $211.9 million in damages and restitution and $75.6 million in prejudgment damages and interest as penalty for the fraud. Tillery's order was upheld on appeal.

Tillery is certified as a specialist in Civil Trial Law and Personal Injury Trial Law by the Texas Board of Legal Specialization.
