= White Rock Plantation =

Historic house in North Carolina, United States

- U.S. National Register of Historic Places
- Location within North Carolina Location within the United States
- Location: Approx. 1734 Williams Rd Hollister, North Carolina
- Coordinates: 36°17′40″N 77°55′25″W
- Area: 60 acres (24 ha)
- Built: 1750-1799, 1800-1824
- Architectural style: Georgian, Federal
- NRHP reference No.: 79001720
- Added to NRHP: February 14, 1979

White Rock Plantation is a historic plantation house located near Hollister, Halifax County, North Carolina. It dates to the late-18th century, and is a two-story, five-bay, transitional Georgian / Federal-style frame dwelling. It has a gable roof and pairs of exterior chimneys at each end. The front facade features a tall "Mount Vernon" porch added in the mid-20th century.

White Rock was the home of the Williams family and as many as 75 workers who were enslaved.

It was listed on the National Register of Historic Places in 1979.
