= Woodstock (Scotland Neck, North Carolina) =

Historic house in North Carolina, United States

- U.S. National Register of Historic Places
- Location within North Carolina Location within the United States
- Location: West side of U.S. 258, 0.2 miles (0.32 km) south of the junction with SR 1118, near Scotland Neck, North Carolina
- Coordinates: 36°9′9″N 77°25′03″W
- Area: 125 acres (51 ha)
- Built: c. 1783
- Built by: Cheshire, Joseph B.
- NRHP reference No.: 80002844
- Added to NRHP: November 25, 1980

Woodstock is a historic plantation house located near Scotland Neck, Halifax County, North Carolina. The earliest section dates to about 1783, and is a two-story, vernacular frame dwelling with later rear additions. It was expanded in the mid-19th century to a romantic villa house three bays wide and two large bays deep with a shallow gable roof and one-story full-width front porch. The house is set in a formal landscape designed by Joseph B. Cheshire.

It was listed on the National Register of Historic Places in 1980.
