= Bethesda Methodist Protestant Church =

Historic church in North Carolina, United States

- U.S. National Register of Historic Places
- Location within North Carolina Location within the United States
- Location: 30974 NC 561, Brinkleyville, North Carolina
- Coordinates: 36°16′25″N 77°50′28″W
- Area: 1 acre (0.40 ha)
- Built: 1853
- Architectural style: Greek Revival
- NRHP reference No.: 12000576
- Added to NRHP: August 28, 2012

Bethesda Methodist Protestant Church is a historic Methodist Protestant church located at Brinkleyville, Halifax County, North Carolina. It was built in 1853, and is a one-story, vernacular Greek Revival-style heavy timber-frame building. It is sheathed in weatherboard. has a pedimented gable front, paired entrances, and rests on a stuccoed stone pier foundation. Adjacent to the church is the contributing church cemetery.

It was listed on the National Register of Historic Places in 2012.
