= Hollister, North Carolina =

- Census-designated place
- Location within North Carolina Location within the United States
- Coordinates: 36°15′33″N 77°56′11″W
- Country: United States
- State: North Carolina
- County: Halifax

Area
  - Total: 3.95 sq mi (10.22 km^{2})
  - Land: 3.94 sq mi (10.20 km^{2})
  - Water: 0.0077 sq mi (0.02 km^{2})
- Elevation: 230 ft (70 m)

Population (2020)
  - Total: 618
  - Density: 156.9/sq mi (60.58/km^{2})
- Time zone: UTC-5 (Eastern (EST))
  - Summer (DST): UTC-4 (EDT)
- ZIP code: 27844
- Area code: 252
- FIPS code: 37-32100
- GNIS feature ID: 2628637
- Website: www.epodunk.com/cgi-bin/genInfo.php?locIndex=19379

Hollister is a census-designated place and unincorporated community in Halifax County in northeastern North Carolina, United States. As of the 2020 census, Hollister had a population of 618. Hollister's ZIP code is 27844.

== History ==
Matthews Place and White Rock Plantation are listed on the National Register of Historic Places.

== Geography ==
Hollister is located in southwestern Halifax County in the Roanoke Rapids micropolitan area. Its elevation is 246 feet (75 m). North Carolina Highway 561 passes through the community, leading east 13 miles (21 km) to Interstate 95 and southwest 24 miles (39 km) to Louisburg.

== Demographics ==
Historical population
Census	Pop.	Note	%±
2020	618		—
U.S. Decennial Census

=== 2020 census ===
Hollister racial composition
Race	Number	Percentage
White (non-Hispanic)	25	4.05%
Black or African American (non-Hispanic)	181	29.29%
Native American	344	55.66%
Other/Mixed	54	8.74%
Hispanic or Latino	14	2.27%

As of the 2020 United States census, there were 618 people, 275 households, and 165 families residing in the CDP. Many of the American Indians in the CDP come from the Haliwa-Saponi tribe.

== Schools ==
Haliwa-Saponi Tribal School, a public charter school serving grades K–12, is located in Hollister. Hollister Elementary Leadership Academy closed in 2026 when it and Pittman Elementary School were replaced by Eastman Leadership Academy, a pre-K–8 school.
