= Magnolia (Scotland Neck, North Carolina) =

Historic house in North Carolina, United States

- U.S. National Register of Historic Places
- Location within North Carolina Location within the United States
- Location: North of Scotland Neck on U.S. 258, near Scotland Neck, North Carolina
- Coordinates: 36°9′39″N 77°24′25″W
- Area: 130 acres (53 ha)
- Built: c. 1840
- Built by: James Norfleet Smith
- Architectural style: Greek Revival
- NRHP reference No.: 80002842
- Added to NRHP: April 17, 1980

Magnolia is a historic plantation house located near Scotland Neck, Halifax County, North Carolina. It was built about 1840, and is a two-story, five-bay, Greek Revival-style frame dwelling with rear additions. It is sheathed in weatherboard, a hipped roof with interior chimneys, and full-width front porch. The house was originally set in a formal landscape designed by Joseph B. Cheshire.

It was listed on the National Register of Historic Places in 1980.
