= Samuel Warren Branch House =

Historic house in North Carolina, United States

- U.S. National Register of Historic Places
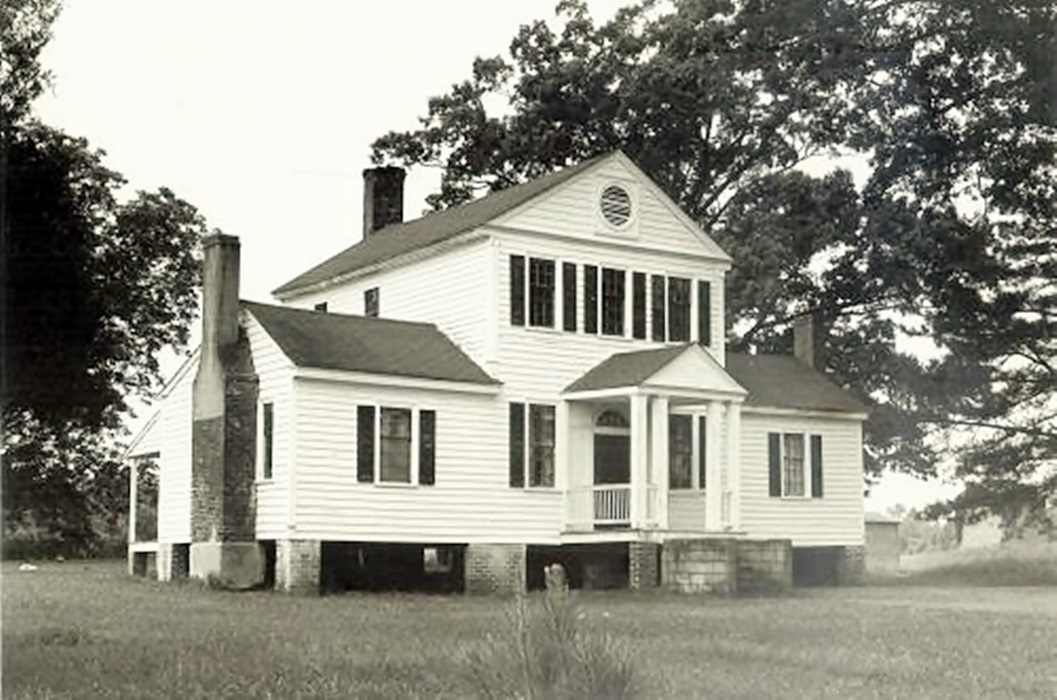

- Location within North Carolina Location within the United States
- Location: NC 481, near Enfield, North Carolina
- Coordinates: 36°11′53″N 77°37′40″W
- Area: 27 acres (11 ha)
- Architectural style: Georgian, Federal
- NRHP reference No.: 82003464
- Added to NRHP: June 14, 1982

Samuel Warren Branch House, also known as Branch Grove, is a historic plantation house located near Enfield, Halifax County, North Carolina. It dates to the late-1840s, and is a tripartite Federal-style frame dwelling with an attached Georgian-style cottage.

It was listed on the National Register of Historic Places in 1982.
