= Shell Castle =

Historic house in North Carolina, United States

- U.S. National Register of Historic Places
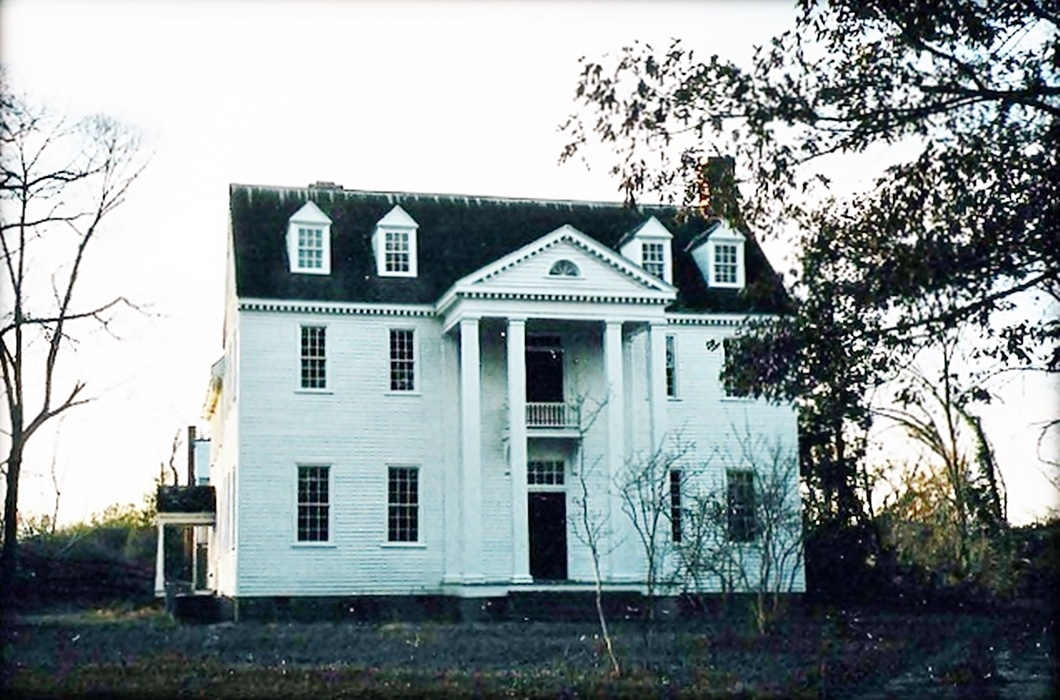

- Location within North Carolina Location within the United States
- Location: West of Enfield on NC 481, near Enfield, North Carolina
- Coordinates: 36°11′10″N 77°42′12″W
- Area: 160 acres (65 ha)
- Built: c. 1790-1802
- Architectural style: Georgian
- NRHP reference No.: 73001347
- Added to NRHP: April 11, 1973

Shell Castle is a historic plantation house located near Enfield, Halifax County, North Carolina. It was built between 1790 and 1802, and is a 2 1/2-story, five-bay, Georgian-style frame dwelling with a two-story rear ell. It is sheathed in beaded siding and has a gable roof.

It was listed on the National Register of Historic Places in 1973.
