= Bell-Sherrod House =

Historic house in North Carolina, United States

- U.S. National Register of Historic Places
- Location within North Carolina Location within the United States
- Location: 207 SE Railroad St., Enfield, North Carolina
- Coordinates: 36°10′41″N 77°40′6″W
- Area: 1 acre (0.40 ha)
- Built: c. 1859
- Architectural style: Greek Revival, Italianate
- NRHP reference No.: 88002027
- Added to NRHP: October 20, 1988

Bell-Sherrod House is a historic home located at Enfield, Halifax County, North Carolina. It was built about 1859, and is a two-story, rectangular, Italianate-style frame dwelling, with a Greek Revival-style front porch. It has a shingled hip roof pierced by two interior chimneys and is sheathed in weatherboard. A conservatory was added about 1915. The house was restored about 1987.

It was listed on the National Register of Historic Places in 1988.
