= The Cellar (Enfield, North Carolina) =

Historic house in North Carolina, United States

- U.S. National Register of Historic Places
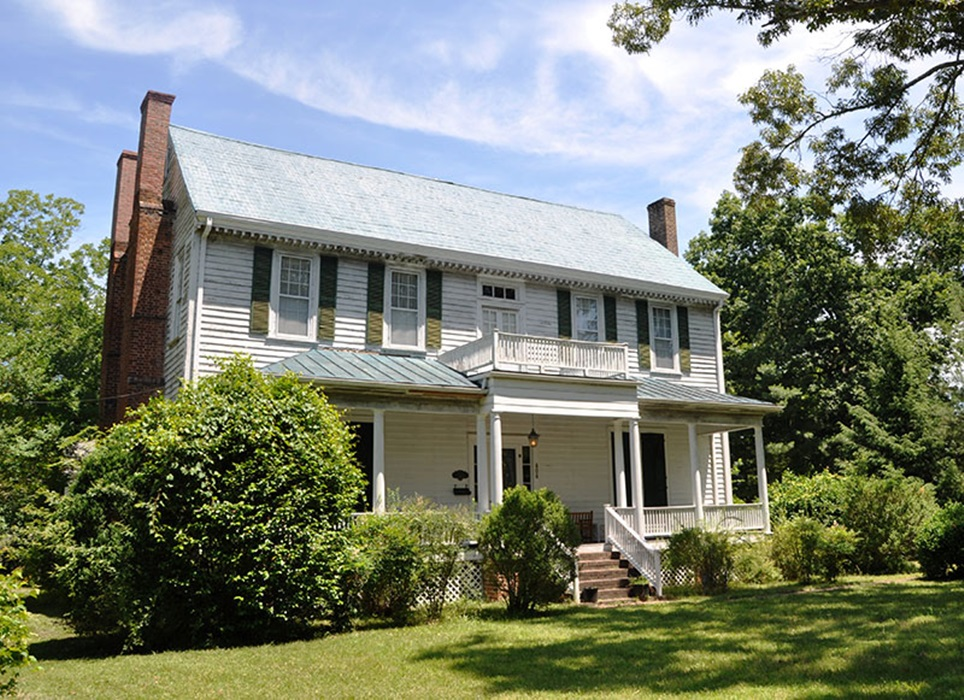

- Location within North Carolina Location within the United States
- Location: 404 Whitfield St., Enfield, North Carolina
- Coordinates: 36°11′04″N 77°40′21″W
- Area: 0 acres (0 ha)
- Built: early-19th century
- NRHP reference No.: 79003336
- Added to NRHP: September 20, 1979

The Cellar is a historic home located at Enfield, Halifax County, North Carolina. It dates to the early-19th century, and is a large two-story, five-bay, frame dwelling with an attached one-story kitchen. It has exterior brick end chimneys and is covered with a rather steep gable roof. It was the childhood home of Congressman and Confederate General Lawrence O'Bryan Branch (1820–1862). The house was visited by the Marquis de Lafayette during his grand tour.

It was listed on the National Register of Historic Places in 1979.
