= Garner Farm =

Historic farm in North Carolina, United States

- U.S. National Register of Historic Places
- U.S. Historic district
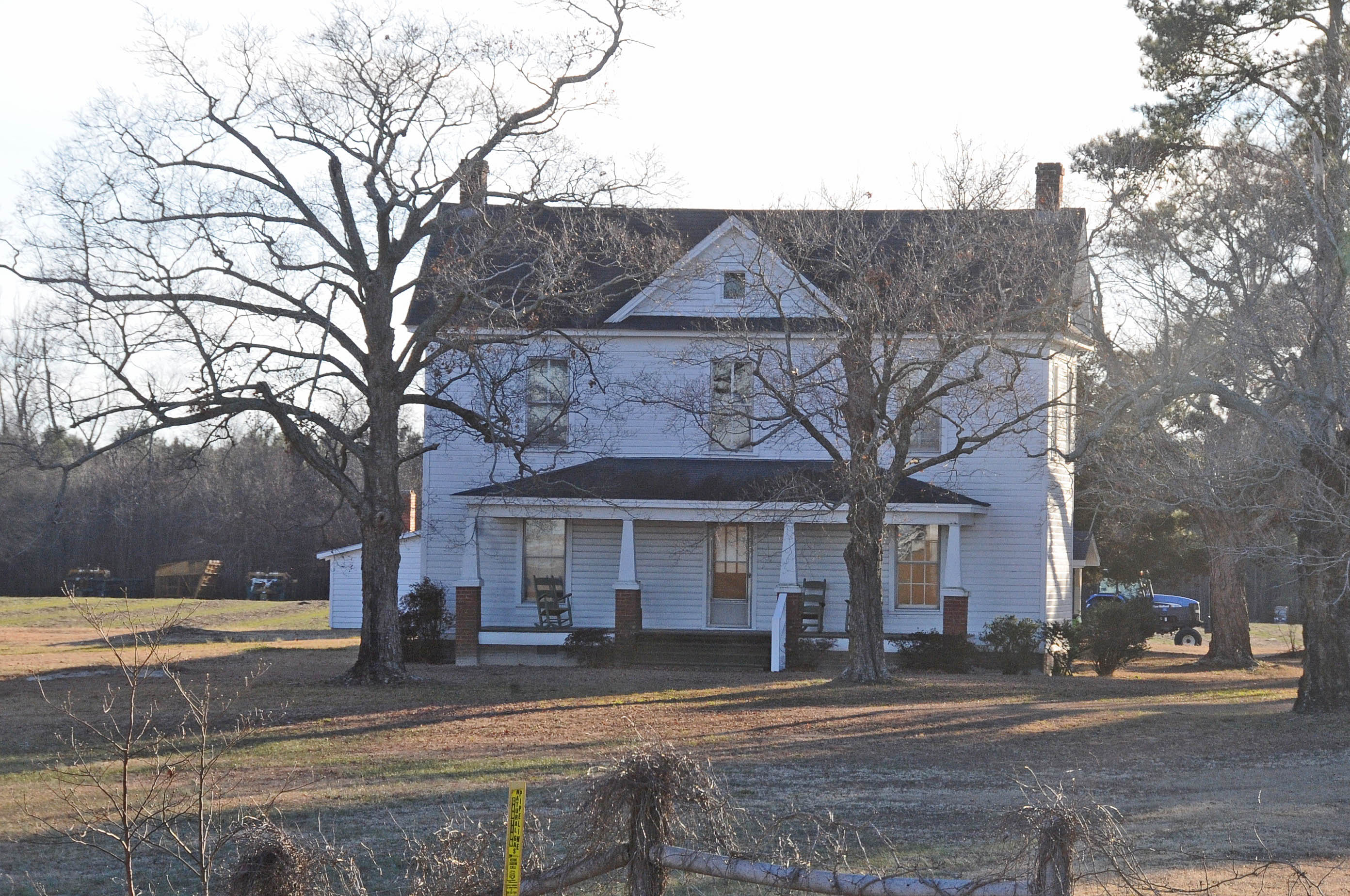

- Location within North Carolina Location within the United States
- Location: Junction of NC 125 and I-95, near Days Crossroads, North Carolina
- Coordinates: 36°23′58″N 77°38′54″W
- Area: 110 acres (45 ha)
- Built: 1902
- Built by: Johnson, Jim
- Architectural style: I-house
- NRHP reference No.: 90000826
- Added to NRHP: June 7, 1990

Garner Farm is a historic farm and national historic district located near Days Crossroads, Halifax County, North Carolina. It encompasses three contributing buildings and one contributing site, the farm landscape. The farmhouse, commonly known as “The Big House” to the family, was built between 1900 and 1902, and is a "triple-A" I-house, three bays wide, with an original one-story rear ell. It has a gable roof with interior end chimneys and pedimented gable ends. The house was modernized in the 1940s. Also on the property is a contributing kitchen (c. 1900–1902, moved 1942) and packhouse (c. 1920).

It was listed on the National Register of Historic Places in 1990.
