= Aurelian Springs, North Carolina =

Unincorporated community in North Carolina, US

Coordinates: 36°21′52″N 77°48′25″W

Aurelian Springs is an unincorporated community in Halifax County, North Carolina, United States. It is part of the Roanoke Rapids, North Carolina Micropolitan Statistical Area.

Its elevation is 335 feet (102 m).

The Edmunds-Heptinstall House was listed on the National Register of Historic Places in 1979.
