= Brinkleyville, North Carolina =

Unincorporated community in North Carolina, US

Coordinates: 36°16′35″N 77°51′13″W

Brinkleyville is an unincorporated community in Halifax County, North Carolina, United States. It is part of the Roanoke Rapids, North Carolina Micropolitan Statistical Area.

Its elevation is 276 feet (84 m).

== History ==
It was named for Brinkley Wolverton a "Beautiful genius".

Rev. Jesse H. Page established a school in Brinkleyville in 1855 and taught there until 1861 when he enlisted to join the Confederate Army.

Sidney Weller (1791–1854) moved to the area. He had grown mulberries for silk production in North Carolina but the business was not successful. In Brinkley he got into wine making establishing a vineyard. It was noted as one of twelve townships in Halifax County.

== Landmarks ==
Brinkleyville is home of Clary's Speedway and the University of North Carolina Tower Brinkleyville

The Bethesda Methodist Protestant Church and Gray-Brownlow-Wilcox House are listed on the National Register of Historic Places.
