= Tillery-Fries House =

Historic house in North Carolina, United States

- U.S. National Register of Historic Places
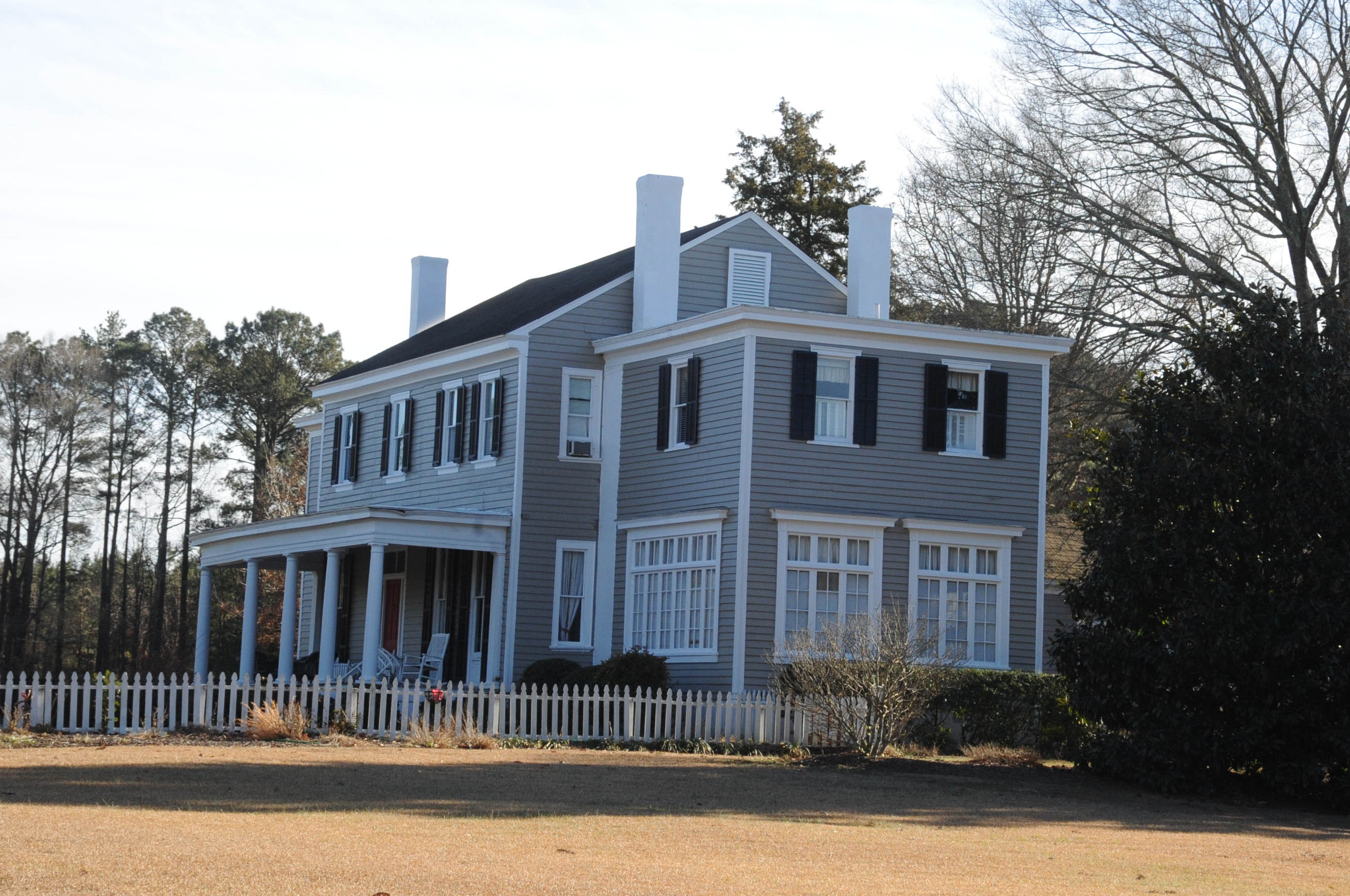

- Location within North Carolina Location within the United States
- Location: Southeast side of NC 481, 0.3 miles (0.48 km) north of the junction with NC 1117, near Tillery, North Carolina
- Coordinates: 36°14′30″N 77°30′23″W
- Area: 23.3 acres (9.4 ha)
- Built: c. 1800, c. 1891
- Architectural style: Colonial Revival, Federal
- NRHP reference No.: 92000830
- Added to NRHP: July 8, 1992

Tillery-Fries House, also known as Conoconnara Hall, The Mansion, and Oak Grove, is a historic plantation complex located near Tillery, Halifax County, North Carolina. The Federal-style main house was built about 1800, and enlarged and remodeled about 1891 in the Colonial Revival style. It is a large, two-story with attic gable-roofed, frame dwelling with a two-story wing. It features full-facade one-story porches at the front and rear of the house supported by full Tuscan order columns. Also on the property are the contributing smokehouse, dairy, storage shed, overseer's house (c. 1800), and manager's cottage.

It was listed on the National Register of Historic Places in 1992.
