= Enfield, North Carolina =

- Town
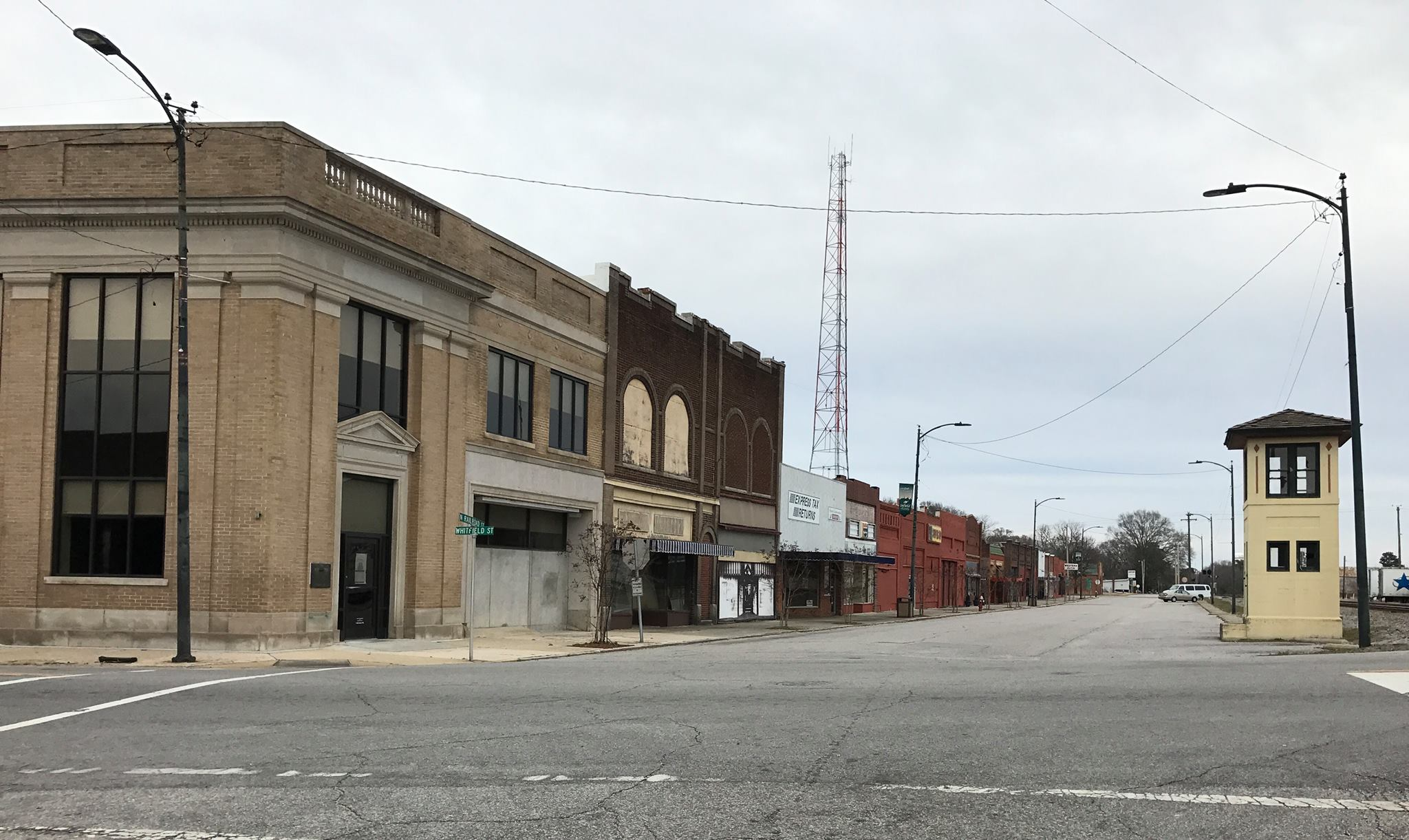
- Buildings along Railroad Street

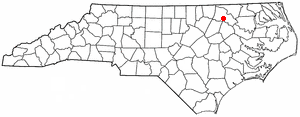
- Location of Enfield, North Carolina
- Coordinates: 36°10′48″N 77°40′08″W
- Country: United States
- State: North Carolina
- County: Halifax

Area
  - Total: 1.30 sq mi (3.37 km^{2})
  - Land: 1.30 sq mi (3.37 km^{2})
  - Water: 0 sq mi (0.00 km^{2})
- Elevation: 105 ft (32 m)

Population (2020)
  - Total: 1,865
  - Density: 1,433.6/sq mi (553.52/km^{2})
- Time zone: UTC-5 (Eastern (EST))
  - Summer (DST): UTC-4 (EDT)
- ZIP code: 27823
- Area code: 252
- FIPS code: 37-21360
- GNIS feature ID: 2406450
- Website: www.enfieldnc.org

Enfield is a town in Halifax County, North Carolina, United States, and was founded in 1740. As of the 2020 census, the town's population was 1,864, which reflected a decrease of almost 27% from the population of 2,538 in 2010. It is the oldest town in Halifax County, and was once the world's largest raw peanut market. Enfield is part of the Roanoke Rapids micropolitan area.

== History ==
The small rural town was site of the Enfield Riots, which helped spark American independence. The Crown governed the area, and Robert Earl Granville, heir of John Lord Carteret, possessed land rights in the district. The riots were set off by a controversy over corrupt agents, land grants, titles, and the collection of quit rents (which often ended up in Granville’s pocket). A group of Colonists — many of them land owners and office holders from Halifax, Edgecombe, and Granville counties — went to Edenton on the night of January 25, 1759, and kidnapped Francis Corbin and a co-agent, Joshua Bodley. Corbin and Bodley were brought to Enfield, where they were thrown in jail for four days and forced to open all land records for public inspection. Corbin returned illegal fees he had collected, but he filed a lawsuit against his abductors after his release.

The suit was eventually dropped, but the Colonial Assembly jailed some of the men who had kidnapped Corbin and Bodley. A group of citizens in Enfield expressed outrage against British tyranny and on May 14, 1759, broke into jail and freed the men.

== National Register of Historic Places ==
- Enfield Historic District
- U.S. National Register of Historic Places
- U.S. Historic district
- Location within North Carolina Location within the United States
- Location: Roughly bounded by North Church, West Bryant, North Railroad, Liberty, North McDaniel, Whitaker, SW Railroad, Tucker and McGwigan Sts., East and West Burnette Aves.
- Coordinates: 36.1814°N 77.6679°W
- NRHP reference No.: 100006809
- Added to NRHP: August 16, 2021

Bell-Sherrod House, Bellamy's Mill, Samuel Warren Branch House, The Cellar, Enfield Graded School, Gray Hall, Myrtle Lawn, James H. Parker House, Shell Castle, Strawberry Hill, and Whitaker's Chapel are listed on the National Register of Historic Places.

The Enfield Historic District was added to the NRHP in 2021.

== Geography ==
According to the United States Census Bureau, the town has an area of 1.22 square miles (3.2 km^{2}), all land, but Enfield Township comprises 126.8 square miles (328 km^{2}).

Industries providing employment: Manufacturing (28.0%), Educational, health and social services (19.3%), Retail trade (10.2%), Arts, Entertainment, Recreation, Accommodation and food services (10.0%).

== Demographics ==
Historical population
Census	Pop.	Note	%±
1880	504		—
1890	568		12.7%
1900	361		−36.4%
1910	1,167		223.3%
1920	1,648		41.2%
1930	2,234		35.6%
1940	2,208		−1.2%
1950	2,361		6.9%
1960	2,978		26.1%
1970	3,272		9.9%
1980	2,995		−8.5%
1990	3,082		2.9%
2000	2,347		−23.8%
2010	2,532		7.9%
2020	1,865		−26.3%
U.S. Decennial Census

=== 2020 census ===
Enfield racial composition
Race	Number	Percentage
White (non-Hispanic)	201	10.73%
Black or African American (non-Hispanic)	1,584	84.93%
Native American	11	0.59%
Asian	1	0.05%
Pacific Islander	1	0.05%
Other/Mixed	55	2.95%
Hispanic or Latino	12	0.64%

As of the 2020 census, Enfield had a population of 1,865. The median age was 43.4 years. 21.9% of residents were under the age of 18 and 22.0% of residents were 65 years of age or older. For every 100 females there were 85.4 males, and for every 100 females age 18 and over there were 81.1 males age 18 and over.

0.0% of residents lived in urban areas, while 100.0% lived in rural areas.

There were 808 households in Enfield, of which 28.2% had children under the age of 18 living in them. Of all households, 19.7% were married-couple households, 22.2% were households with a male householder and no spouse or partner present, and 47.4% were households with a female householder and no spouse or partner present. About 34.8% of all households were made up of individuals, and 19.0% had someone living alone who was 65 years of age or older.

There were 1,034 housing units, of which 21.9% were vacant. The homeowner vacancy rate was 5.7% and the rental vacancy rate was 4.3%.

=== 2000 census ===
As of the census of 2000, there were 2,347 people, 865 households, and 585 families residing in the town. The population density was 1,960.9 inhabitants per square mile (757.1/km^{2}). There were 960 housing units at an average density of 802.1 per square mile (309.7/km^{2}). The racial makeup of the town was 19.43% White, 79.25% African American, 0.09% Native American, 0.04% Pacific Islander, 0.60% from other races, and 0.60% from two or more races. Hispanic or Latino of any race were 1.07% of the population.

There were 865 households, out of which 31.3% had children under the age of 18 living with them, 30.6% were married couples living together, 32.3% had a female householder with no husband present, and 32.3% were non-families. 30.1% of all households were made up of individuals, and 16.4% had someone living alone who was 65 years of age or older. The average household size was 2.65 and the average family size was 3.31.

In the town, the population was spread out, with 29.0% under the age of 18, 9.4% from 18 to 24, 23.8% from 25 to 44, 20.1% from 45 to 64, and 17.7% who were 65 years of age or older. The median age was 36 years. For every 100 females, there were 79.6 males. For every 100 females age 18 and over, there were 73.2 males.

The median income for a household in the town was $19,762, and the median income for a family was $22,105. Males had a median income of $27,000 versus $18,676 for females. The per capita income for the town was $12,033. About 31.3% of families and 34.1% of the population were below the poverty line, including 45.1% of those under age 18 and 29.9% of those age 65 or over.

== Notable people ==
- John T. Alsop, former mayor of Jacksonville, Florida.
- Ruth Bellamy (1906-1969), writer, born in Enfield.
- John Branch Jr. was an American politician who served as U.S. Senator, Secretary of the Navy, the 19th Governor of the state of North Carolina, and was the sixth and last territorial governor of Florida.
- George Eastman had a second home in Enfield. Eastman’s most regular vacations were his triannual trips down to Oak Lodge, his rustic hunting retreat in Enfield, North Carolina.
