= Hope Mills Dam =

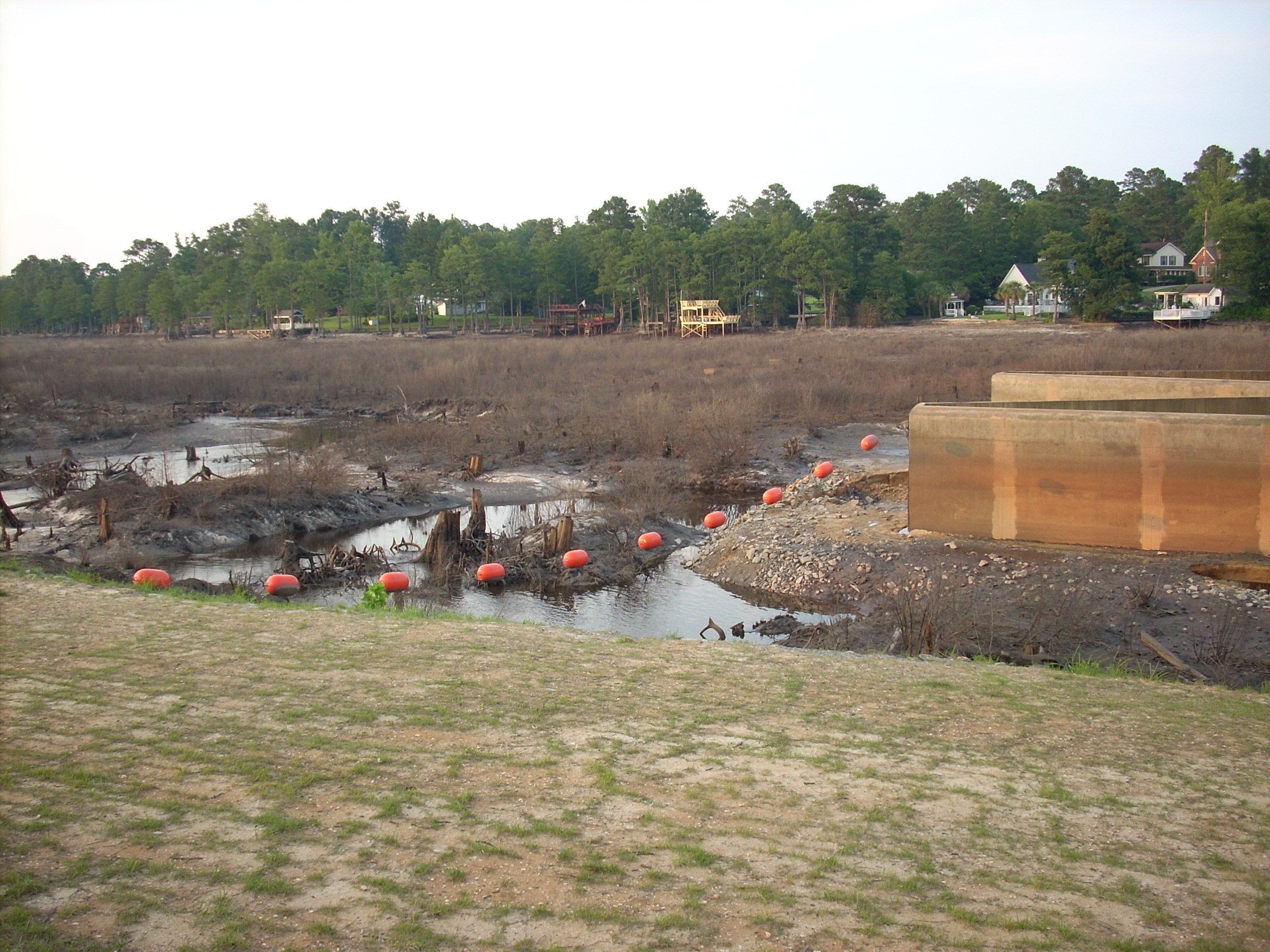
- Hope Mills Dam and drained lake, June 2010

- Location within North Carolina
- Location: Hope Mills, Cumberland County, North Carolina
- Coordinates: 34°58′20″N 78°56′42″W
- Status: Operational
- Construction began: 2007
- Opening date: 2008
- Construction cost: $9.8 million
- Owner: Town of Hope Mills

Dam and spillways
- Type of dam: Concrete gravity
- Impounds: Little Rockfish Creek
- Height: 33 ft (10 m)
- Length: 750 ft (230 m)
- Spillway type: Chute, labyrinth
- Spillway capacity: 10,240 cu ft/s (290 m^{3}/s)

Reservoir
- Creates: Hope Mills Lake
- Total capacity: 816 acre⋅ft (1,007,000 m^{3})
- Catchment area: 94.4 sq mi (244 km^{2})
- Surface area: 88 acres (0.36 km^{2})

The Hope Mills Dam, also known as Hope Mills Dam #1, is a concrete gravity dam on Little Rockfish Creek in Hope Mills, North Carolina, United States, which created Hope Mills Lake. Four different dams were built on the site including the current one. The first dam, of rock-crib design, was built in 1839 to power local cotton mills. The second was an embankment dam built in 1924 for powering the mills and later to maintain the lake's water level. Both previous dams failed from flooding. Then in June 2010 a leak was discovered and the lake was drained. The current dam was completed in early 2018 and water to be impounded in January but rainwater filled the dam before water even needed to be impounded.

== History ==
The first Hope Mills Dam was a rock-crib dam and was built in 1839 by the Rockfish Mills Co. for the powering of four cotton mills nearby. In 1865, General Sherman and Union Army troops burned the cotton mills but spared the dam from destruction. After the American Civil War, two mills were rebuilt and the surrounding area including the dam was named Hope Mills. On May 9, 1923 this first dam was breached by a flood and construction on an earthen-embankment dam began the same year. Rockfish Mills Co. again constructed the dam with designs from Mees Consulting Engineers of Charlotte and the actual construction by the Scott-Stewart Jones Co. The second dam cost $27,093 and was completed in early 1924.

In 1930, Rockfish Mills Co. went bankrupt and was not bought until 1941 by Dixie Yarns. Dixie Yarns eventually gave the dam to the town in 1984. In 1993, a two-lane Lakeview Road bridge was installed over the dam and at the same time a leak in the dam was repaired. In 1994, an unused turbine shaft from the old cotton mill site was uncovered and filled with cement. In addition, walls behind the dam's spillway were reinforced with rock after concerns were voiced about their strength. Hurricane Floyd brought heavy rains in 1999 which, after concerns of a dam breach, forced the opening of the floodgates. In 2001, a 6-foot (1.8 m) crack was repaired that engineers had determined was not structural. Later in 2001, the dam passed safety inspection but two small holes and some eroded concrete was repaired in 2002.

=== 2003 failure and reconstruction ===
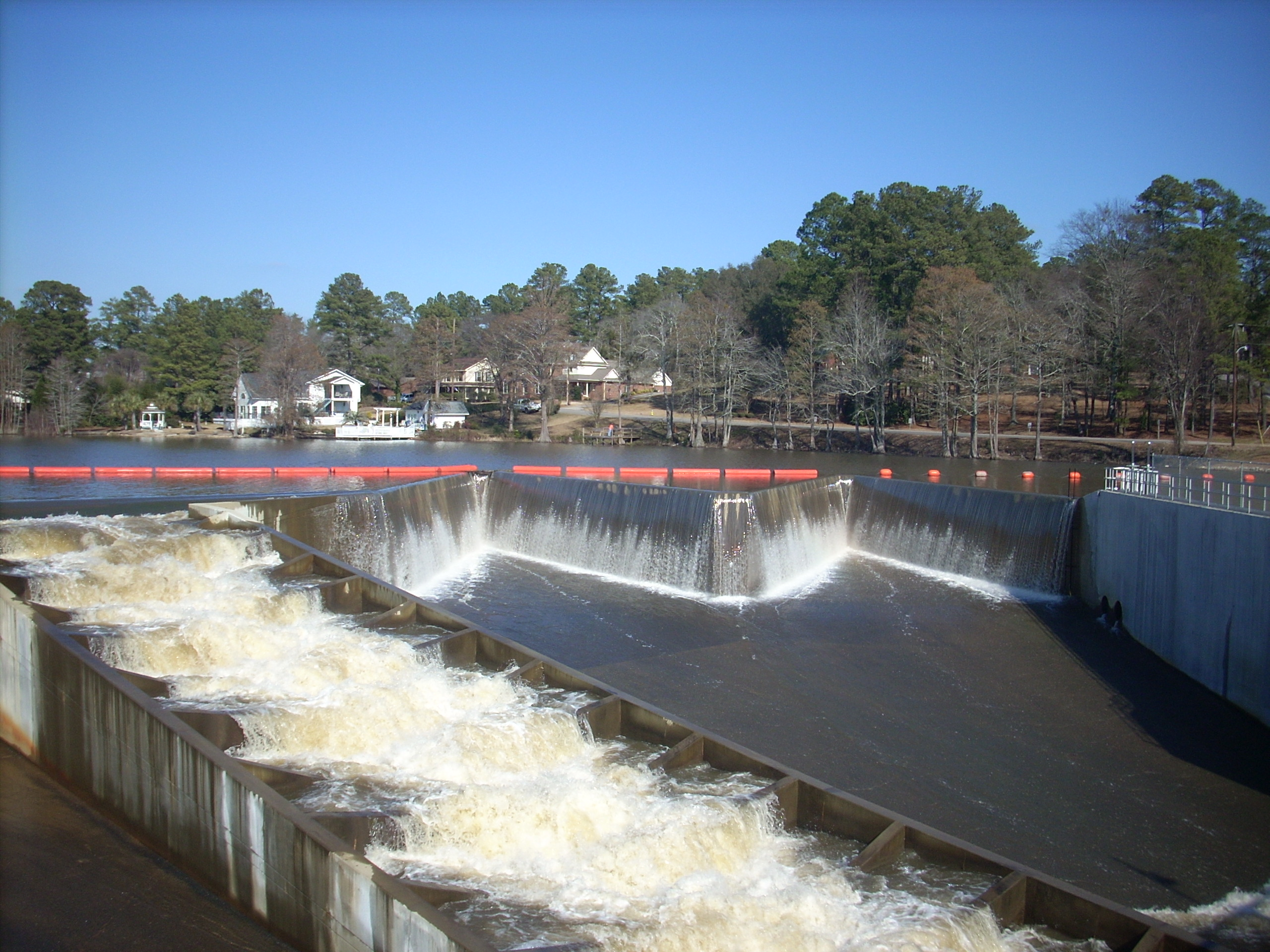
The reconstructed dam in 2010

In late May 2003, over Memorial Day weekend, heavy rains caused the embankment dam to give way and also destroyed 30 feet (9.1 m) of the nearby Lakeview Road. About 40 homes and 1600 people downstream were evacuated as water from Hope Mills Lake rushed down the creek causing $2.1 million in damages before making its way to the Cape Fear River. One of the floodgates on the dam had failed to open because of the pressure exerted by the flood waters, which helped push water over the top of the dam. Later in 2003, Lakeview Road was repaired and plans for the repair of the dam were underway. After four years of fund and permit requests, construction on the new 14 million dollar Hope Mills Dam began in March 2007. Crowder Construction Company was awarded the contract to construct the dam along with designs from Mactec, Morrison Engineers. The new dam would essentially be a concrete labyrinth-spillway that would expand the dam's ability to discharge flood waters. The new dam would be 600 feet (180 m) longer and would incorporate a fish ladder as well. Construction of the new Hope Mills Dam was complete in June 2008 and the lake was again full by August.

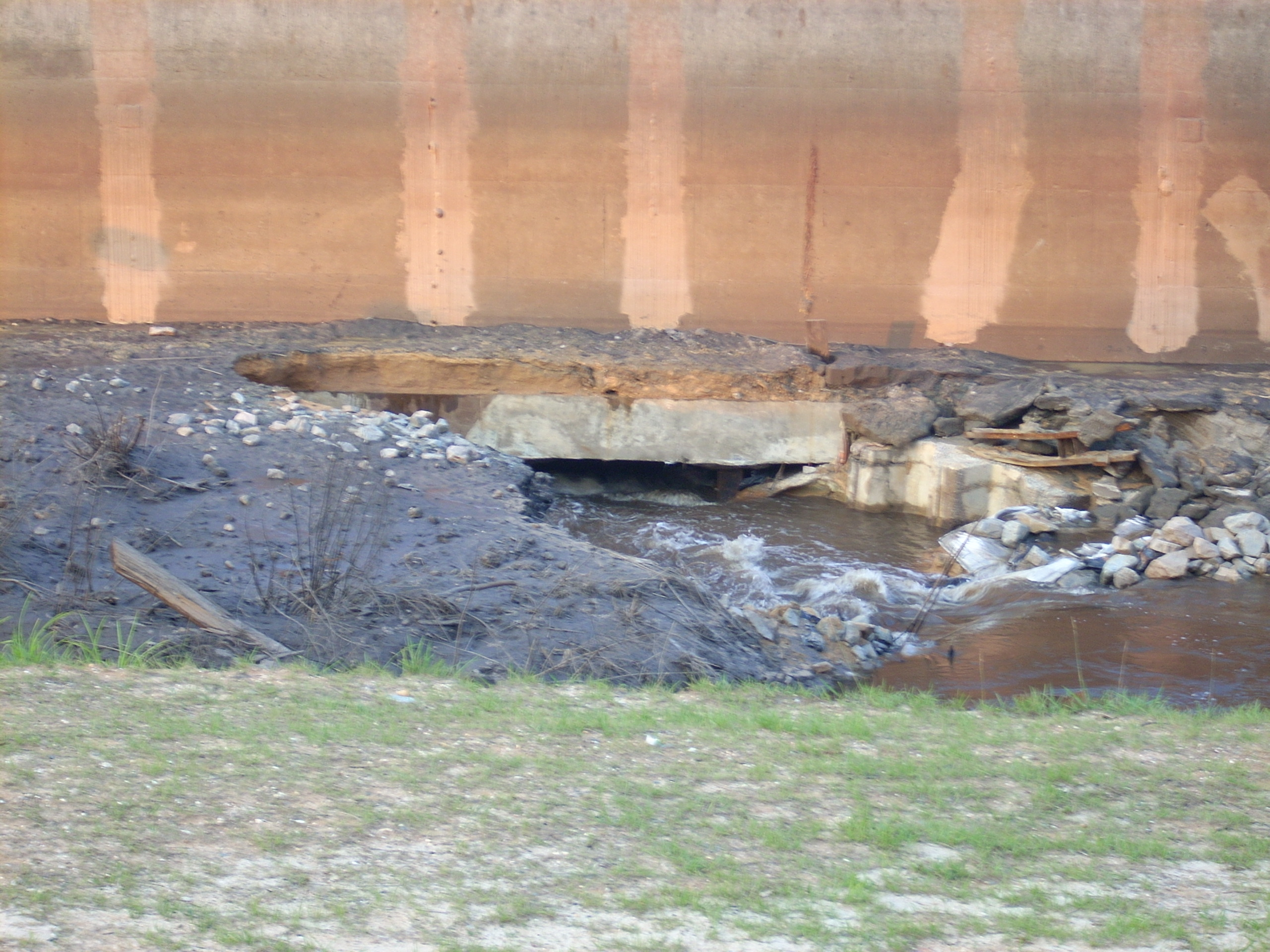
Water passing through a sinkhole in the dam's foundation

=== 2010 failure ===
On Wednesday, June 16, 2010, a controlled release began after engineers noticed silt coming out of the lower side of the dam. Residents were informed to loosen the ropes to their boats because the lake was going to be lowered two feet. Town officials later told residents the lake may have to be lowered as much as nine feet to inspect the dam. Overnight a sinkhole developed at the base of the dam and the lake water drained underneath the foundation. By Thursday morning (June 17, 2010) almost all of the water in the lake was gone and the town awoke to a news helicopter hovering overhead with a live video feed to ABC11.

Repairs for the dam were expected to begin in August 2012 and end October 2013 but they never occurred. A lawsuit was filed by the town in mid-October 2012, complaining that the companies involved were delaying the repairs which had yet to begin. In April 2013 Mayor Jackie Warner requested a plan to remove the dam but the town sued the builders for $10 million in May in order to pay for repairs. In July 2014, the town received a $9.4 million settlement from the builders.

=== 2016 Reconstruction ===
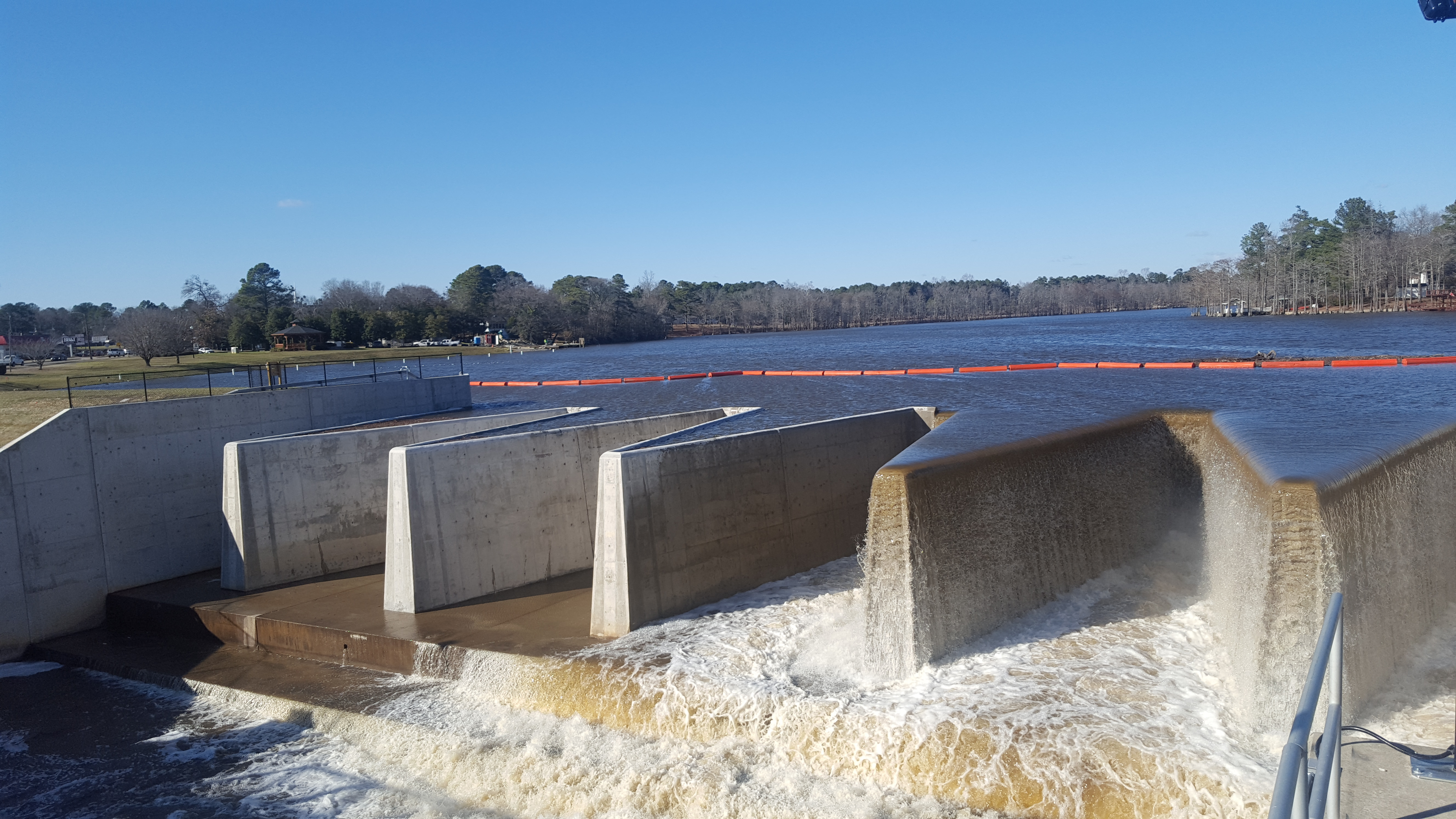
The reconstructed dam in 2018

In March 2016, construction of a new dam started after years of frustration. The ribbon cutting for the completed dam was on 31 January 2018. "but [s]teady rains ... filled the formerly empty lake bed to its proper level", Town Manager Melissa Adams said. As a result, the town shut the dam's gates, impounding the water in the lake.

=== Envision Sustainability Award ===
On Wednesday, August 7, 2019, the Institute for Sustainable Infrastructure announced that the reconstructed Hope Mills Dam had been awarded an Envision Bronze award for sustainability. The project was the first dam project to earn an Envision award. The project was completed by a design-build team composed of Schnabel Engineering and ASI Constructors with a budget of $8 million.

== See also ==
- Dam failure
