= ISEB (disambiguation) =

ISEB may stand for:

- Information Systems Examination Board, former name of the examination awarding body of the British Computer Society
- Independent Schools Examinations Board, UK body that sets the Common Entrance Examination
- International Symposium On Environmental Biogeochemistry, presenters of the Wolf Vishniac Memorial Award for Young Researchers
- Interdisciplinary Science and Engineering Building, former name of the Interdisciplinary Science and Engineering Complex at Northeastern University
