= North Carolina Highway 59 =

State highway in Cumberland County, North Carolina, US

North Carolina Highway 59

Route information
- Maintained by NCDOT
- Length: 8.288 mi (13.338 km)
- Existed: 1958–November 2022

Major junctions
- South end: I-95 in Hope Mills
- I-95 BL / US 301 in Hope Mills; NC 162 in Hope Mills
- North end: US 401 Bus. in Fayetteville

Location
- Country: United States
- State: North Carolina
- Counties: Cumberland

Highway system
- North Carolina Highway System; Interstate; US; State; Scenic
← NC 58	→ NC 60

North Carolina Highway 59 (NC 59) was an 8.288-mile-long (13.338 km) primary state highway in the U.S. state of North Carolina that ran through Cumberland County from Interstate 95 (I-95) near Hope Mills to U.S. Route 401 Business (US 401 Bus.) in Owens, within the city limits of Fayetteville.

== Route description ==
NC 59 was an urban route southwest of Fayetteville. NC 59 began at I-95 (exit 41) and proceeded north from there intersecting I-95 Bus. and U.S. Route 301 shortly thereafter at a partial cloverleaf interchange. NC 59 continued north entering the town of Hope Mills. NC 162 intersected the highway just north of downtown Hope Mills, as NC 59 continued north through the suburban parts of Fayetteville. NC 59 came to its northern end at US 401 Bus. (Raeford Road).

== History ==
NC 59 was first commissioned in 1932 as a new primary highway from US 1/NC 50 in Raleigh following present day US 401 to Louisburg and ending at US 158/NC 48 in Warrenton. In 1957, NC 59 was renumbered in its entirety by US 401.

This alignment was commissioned in 1958 and initially it ran from US 401 west of Owens and around the north side of Fayetteville and ended at US 401 north of Fayetteville. In 1963, NC 59 was extended south through Hope Mills and ended at US 301 as an upgrade to State Routes 1141, 1118, and 1124. By 1968, the northern terminus of NC 59 was truncated to its final endpoint at US 401 Bus. in Owens. US 401 Bus. replaced the original alignment of NC 59 north of there. In 1982, when I-95 was opened around Fayetteville, NC 59 was extended to it.

In November 2022, at the request of both municipalities (Fayetteville and Hope Mills), the North Carolina Department of Transportation decommissioned NC 59 to secondary road 1596. They asked for the change in an effort to redirect commercial truck traffic. The goal of the two cities is to make this route less congested and safer for pedestrians.

== Major intersections ==
The entire route is in Cumberland County.

Location	mi	km	Destinations	Notes
Hope Mills	0.00	0.00	I-95 / Chicken Foot Road – Lumberton, Smithfield	Southern terminus; I-95 exit 41
Hope Mills	0.67	1.08	I-95 BL / US 301 – Parkton, Fayetteville	Interchange
Hope Mills	4.98	8.01	NC 162 (George Owen Road)	
Fayetteville	8.27	13.31	US 401 Bus. (Raeford Road) / Glensford Drive – Fayetteville, Raeford	Northern terminus
1.000 mi = 1.609 km; 1.000 km = 0.621 mi
