= North Carolina Highway 162 =

State highway in Cumberland County, North Carolina, US

North Carolina Highway 162

Route information
- Maintained by NCDOT
- Length: 7.5 mi (12.1 km)
- Existed: 2007–present

Major junctions
- West end: US 401 in Fayetteville
- East end: I-95 BL / US 301 in Hope Mills

Location
- Country: United States
- State: North Carolina
- Counties: Cumberland

Highway system
- North Carolina Highway System; Interstate; US; State; Scenic
← NC 161	→ NC 163

North Carolina Highway 162 (NC 162) is a primary state highway in the U.S. state of North Carolina. The highway serves as an alternate route to the former NC 59 by bypassing downtown Hope Mills.

== Route description ==
NC 162 is a short road at only 7.5 miles (12.1 km) in length. The road begins at U.S. Route 401 (US 401) near the Lafayette Shopping Center. After crossing Hope Mills Road (former NC 59), it bypasses Hope Mills to its north, ending at Interstate 95 Business (I-95 Bus.) and US 301.

== History ==
The first NC 162 was established in 1937 as a renumbering of NC 161. It traversed from NC 16 in Warrensville, to Rugby Road at the Virginia state line. In 1953, the entire route was renumbered as part of NC 194.

The second and current NC 162 was established in 2007 as a new primary routing that was signed on George Owen Road between Fisher Road and Camden Road, crossing NC 59. In 2009, it was extended to its current western terminus with US 401 (Raeford Road) via Bingham Drive and Bunce Road. In 2011, it was extended east from Camden Road to Legion Road. In 2013, after widening and other improvements on Elk Road, NC 162 was extended west along Elk Road to its current terminus with I-95 Bus/US 301, completing the Hope Mills bypass.

== Major junctions ==
The entire highway is in Cumberland County.

Location	mi	km	Destinations	Notes
Fayetteville	0.0	0.0	US 401 (Raeford Road) – Raeford, Fayetteville	
Hope Mills	7.5	12.1	I-95 BL / US 301 – Lumberton, Fayetteville	
1.000 mi = 1.609 km; 1.000 km = 0.621 mi
