= Victor Fontanez =

American barber and social media personality

Victor Antonio Fontanez
- Born: Victor Antonio Fontanez Germany
- Other name: Vic Blends
- Education: South View High School
- Occupations: Entrepreneur, Social Media Influencer, Philanthropist, Motivational Speaker
- Known for: Founding the first barbershop academy in a California state prison, viral social media presence, motivational talks
- Notable work: DeepCut (Talk Show); Forbes 30 Under 30 (2022)

Victor Antonio Fontanez aka "Vic Blends" is an entrepreneur, social media influencer, philanthropist and motivational speaker. In 2021, he and partner Scott Budnick opened the first barbershop academy in a California state prison. Fontanez has 25 million followers across all social media platforms.

== Early life ==
Born in Germany but reared in Hope Mills, North Carolina, Fontanez is the oldest of four children. He attended South View High School. His father is a retired military veteran. Fontanez identifies as Latino and has openly expressed pride about his ethnic background.

As a youth, Fontanez frequented Barber Kings barbershop in Fayetteville, North Carolina, where he was mentored by the owner, Sundiata "Sean" Morris. While a high school senior, he began cutting hair out of his mother's garage, deciding to forego college in order to pursue this new professional goal.

In 2017, Fontanez spotted NBA player Dennis Smith Jr. (also from Fayetteville) when he entered Rudinos, a sports bar in the area, in order to use the restroom. Fontanez stopped Smith and offered to give him a haircut and also gave him his last business card. Smith eventually took up Fontanez's offer and that relationship opened doors for Fontanez who moved to Atlanta and began cutting hair for other notable athletes and musical artists.

== Career ==
=== Social media influencer ===
Because of the COVID-19 pandemic, Fontanez's business halted in 2021. One day he went to a park and offered free hair cuts to strangers, while asking "Can I bless you with a haircut?," which has become his signature opening. During the haircut, the conversations focus on the client's mental health and wellness; Fontanez once noted that barbering is an act of healing. A friend filmed the interactions, which went viral on TikTok and Instagram, helping Fontanez amass a following of over 25 million followers. Fontanez also began giving motivational talks. "I just wanted to inspire kids to chase what they love," he told a journalist.

In 2022, Fontanez was named in Forbes 30 Under 30.

=== DeepCut ===
In 2023, Fontanez launched a more polished talk show series called "DeepCut," which features notable guests, such as Barack Obama, Tom Brady and Lil Baby.

=== Valley State Prison ===
In 2021, Scott Budnick, a film producer, reached out via a mutual acquaintance and invited Fontanez to speak to inmates at a California prison in order to inspire them. Budnick is the co-founder of the Anti-Recidivism Coalition, a Los Angeles-based non-profit organization. Although Fontanez was on track to open a physical barbershop in Atlanta, he decided to partner with Budnick, and together they opened the first barbershop academy in a California state prison, Valley State Prison, a men's only facility in Chowchilla. The program allows individuals to earn a license while they are in prison. Students enroll by cohort, up to 30 men at a time. Upon successful completion of the program, graduates earn an official California barber's license, providing a pathway to a career post-incarceration. According to Fontanez, the goal of the academy "is to break the cycle of incarceration and recidivism trap that many communities suffer from".
