= Hope Mills Historic District =

Historic district in North Carolina, United States

- U.S. National Register of Historic Places
- U.S. Historic district
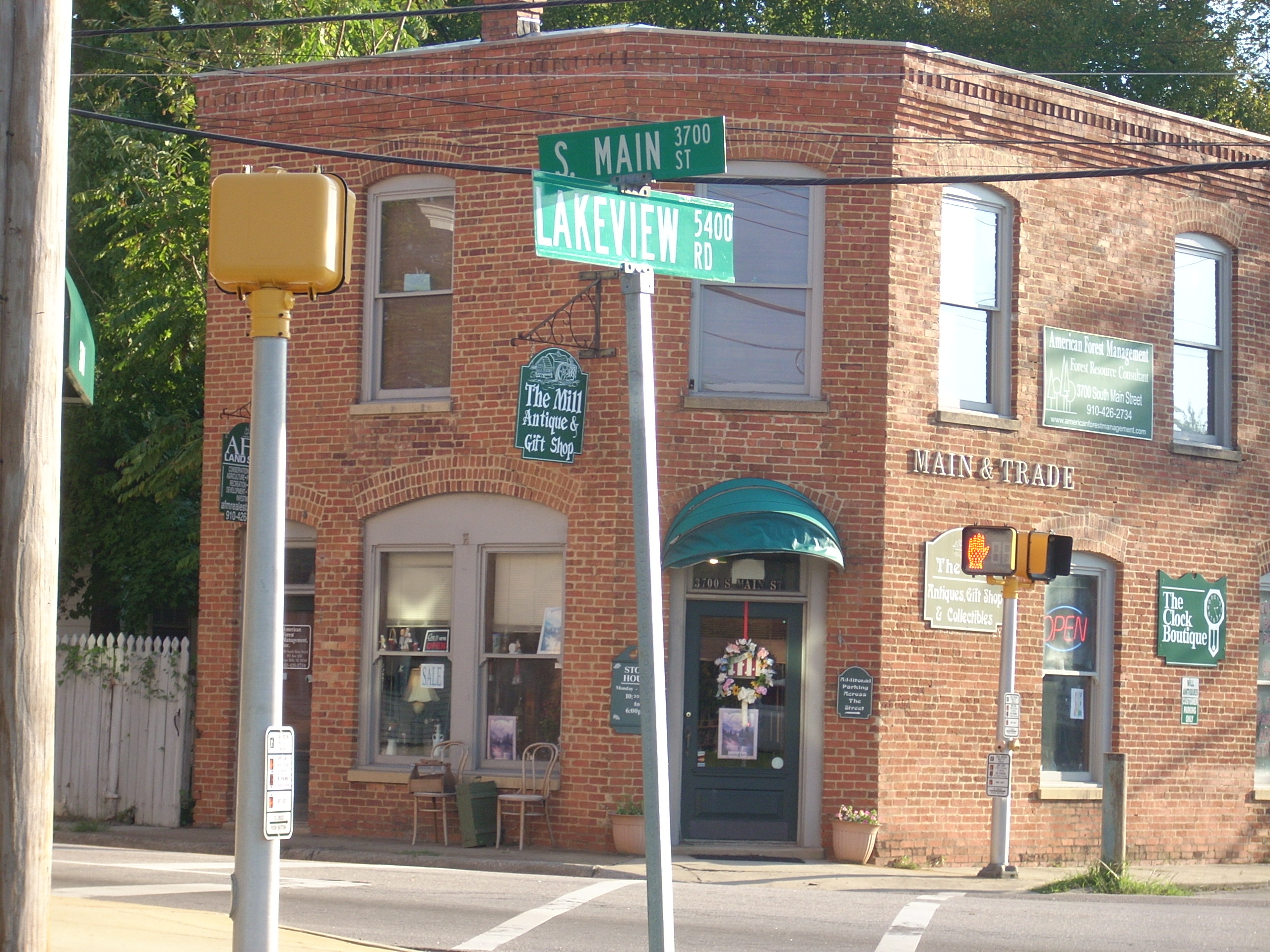
- South Main and Lakeview, Hope Mills Historic District, August 2011

- Location within North Carolina Location within the United States
- Location: Roughly bounded by Seaboard Coastline RR tracks, Lakeview Rd., Little Creek and Cross St., Hope Mills, North Carolina
- Coordinates: 34°58′17″N 78°56′43″W
- Area: 75 acres (30 ha)
- Architect: Multiple
- Architectural style: Mid 19th Century Revival, Late Victorian, Federal
- NRHP reference No.: 85001515
- Added to NRHP: July 9, 1985

Hope Mills Historic District is a national historic district located at Hope Mills, Cumberland County, North Carolina. It encompasses 61 contributing buildings and 3 contributing sites in the central business district of Hope Mills. Ii includes industrial, commercial, religious, and residential buildings and includes notable examples of Federal and Late Victorian style architecture. Notable buildings include the (former) Hope Mills Manufacturing Company buildings, Rockfish Manufacturing Company, Colin MacRae House (c. 1828), Christ Episcopal Church, Lebanon Masonic Lodge No. 391, and Alice L. Gilbert Store.

It was listed on the National Register of Historic Places in 1985.
