= Big Rockfish Presbyterian Church =

Historic church in North Carolina, United States

- U.S. National Register of Historic Places
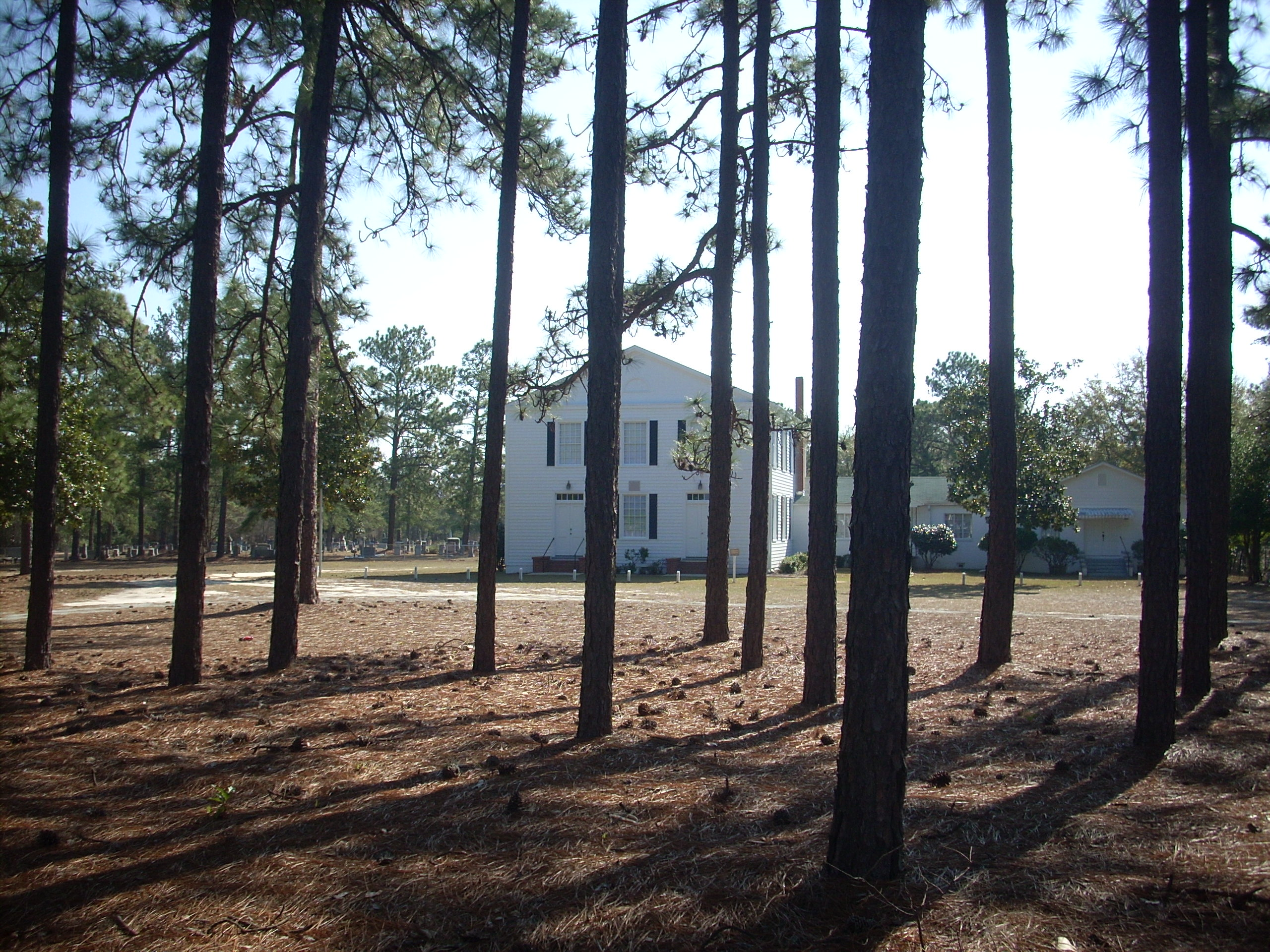
- The church as seen through a stand of pines

- Location within North Carolina Location within the United States
- Location: SR 2268, Hope Mills, North Carolina
- Coordinates: 34°57′6″N 78°55′27″W
- Area: 13.1 acres (5.3 ha)
- Built: 1855
- Architect: McDonald, John
- Architectural style: Greek Revival
- NRHP reference No.: 83001844
- Added to NRHP: July 21, 1983

Big Rockfish Presbyterian Church is a historic Presbyterian church located at Hope Mills, North Carolina, United States. It was built in 1855, and is a two-story, three bay by four bay, gable-end frame building with double front entrances in the vernacular Greek Revival style.

It was listed on the National Register of Historic Places in 1983.

Worship still continues each Sunday at 11AM with education hour at 10AM. The church hosts many special events throughout the year for different ages and for the community. The church is alongside Highway 301 (I-95 Business) Northbound side, Marracco St is the service road. The church is at the corner of McNeil St. 0.7 miles north of the Highway 59 Overpass.

It is part of The Presbyterian Church USA and the Presbytery of Coastal Carolina.

The church is referred to in a short story by Charles W. Chesnutt entitled "The Marked Tree," where a young man attends this church and becomes very religious while dating a local Rockfish belle he later marries.
