= Hope Mills Lake =

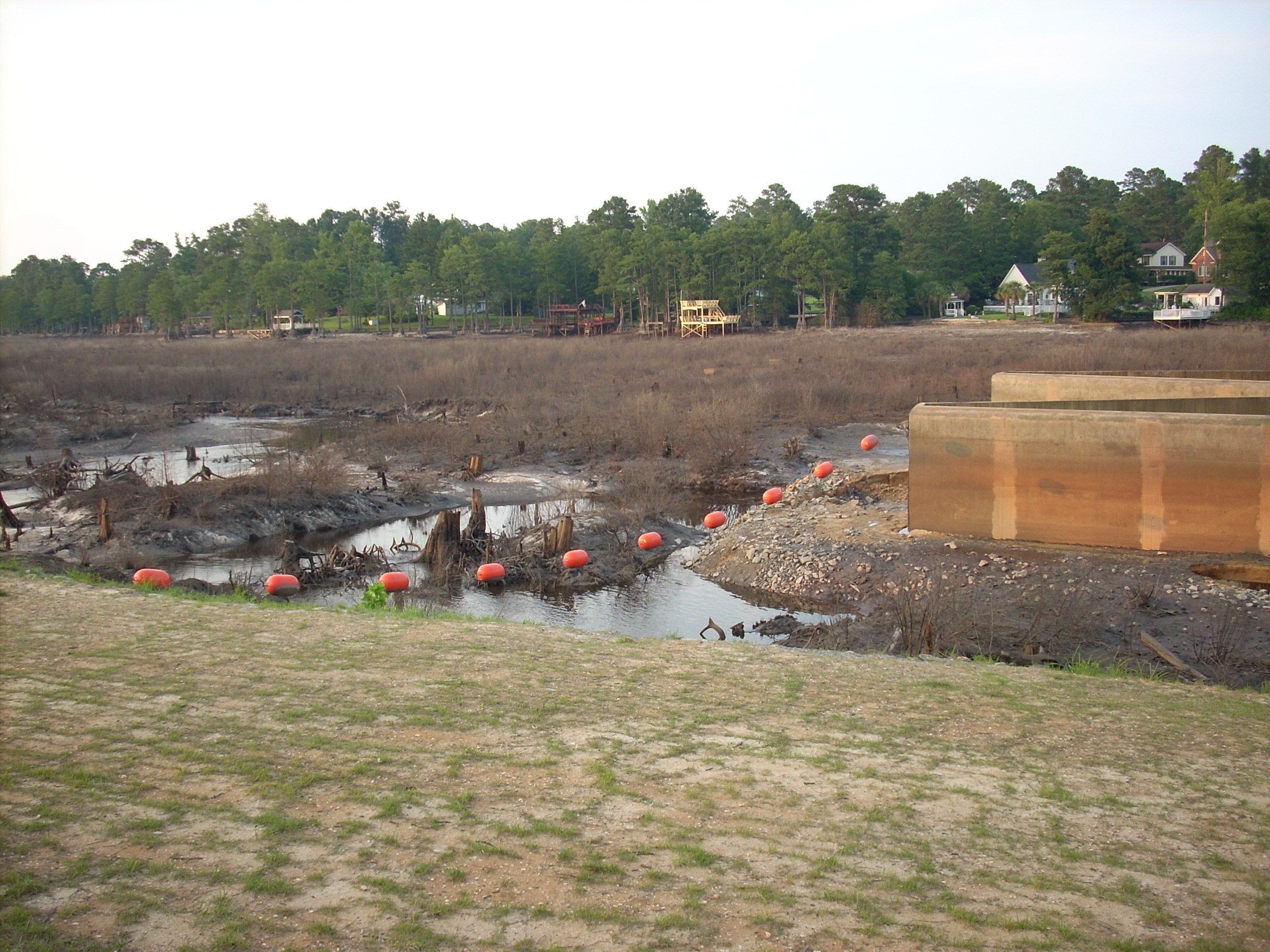
- Hope Mills Lake in June 2010

- Location within North Carolina Location within the United States
- Location: Hope Mills, Cumberland County, North Carolina, US
- Coordinates: 34°58′25.59″N 78°56′43.10″W
- Type: reservoir
- Primary inflows: Little Rockfish Creek
- Basin countries: United States
- Surface area: 88 acres (36 ha)

Hope Mills Lake, also referred to as Hope Mills Lake #1, and by long-time citizens as The Pond, was a lake in Hope Mills in Cumberland County, North Carolina. Before it was a lake, it was a mill pond which was fed by Little Rockfish Creek. The mill pond was created in 1839 near the Hope Mills Dam for the first cotton mill in the area. At the time, the area was called Little Rockfish Village. In 2003, heavy rains caused the earthen dam to fail and the lake was unintentionally drained. By 2006, the lake had not been restored so the Friends of Hope Mills Lake was incorporated as a North Carolina non-profit organization to promote and raise funds for the timely restoration and preservation of the dam. In 2008 the new dam was completed and full for the first time in 5 years. In June 2010, the Lake was intentionally drained for safety reasons, after an inspection discovered a sinkhole that was leaking water under the dam's structure.

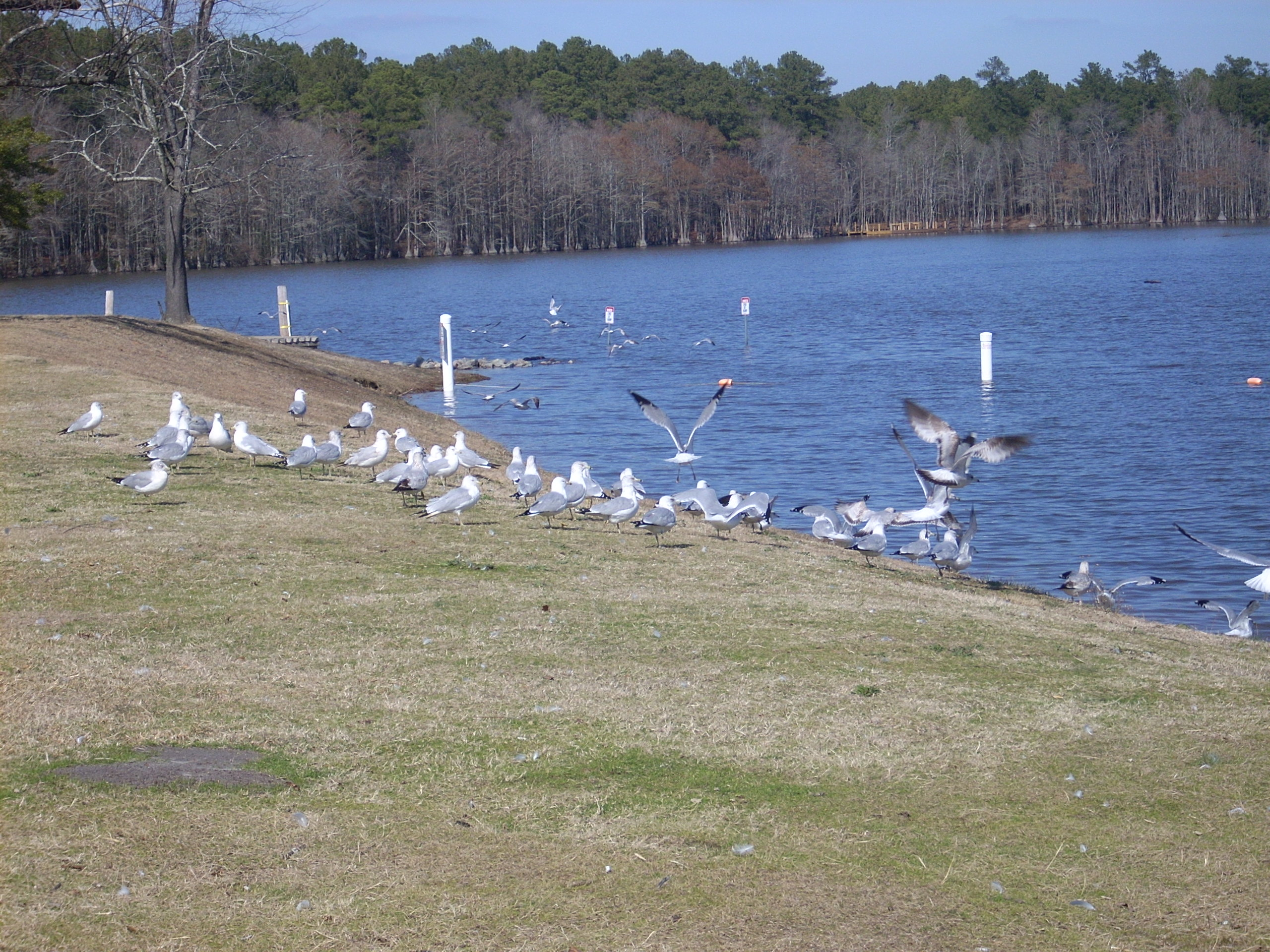
The lake in 2010

== See also ==
- Town of Hope Mills
