= Interdisciplinary Science and Engineering Complex =

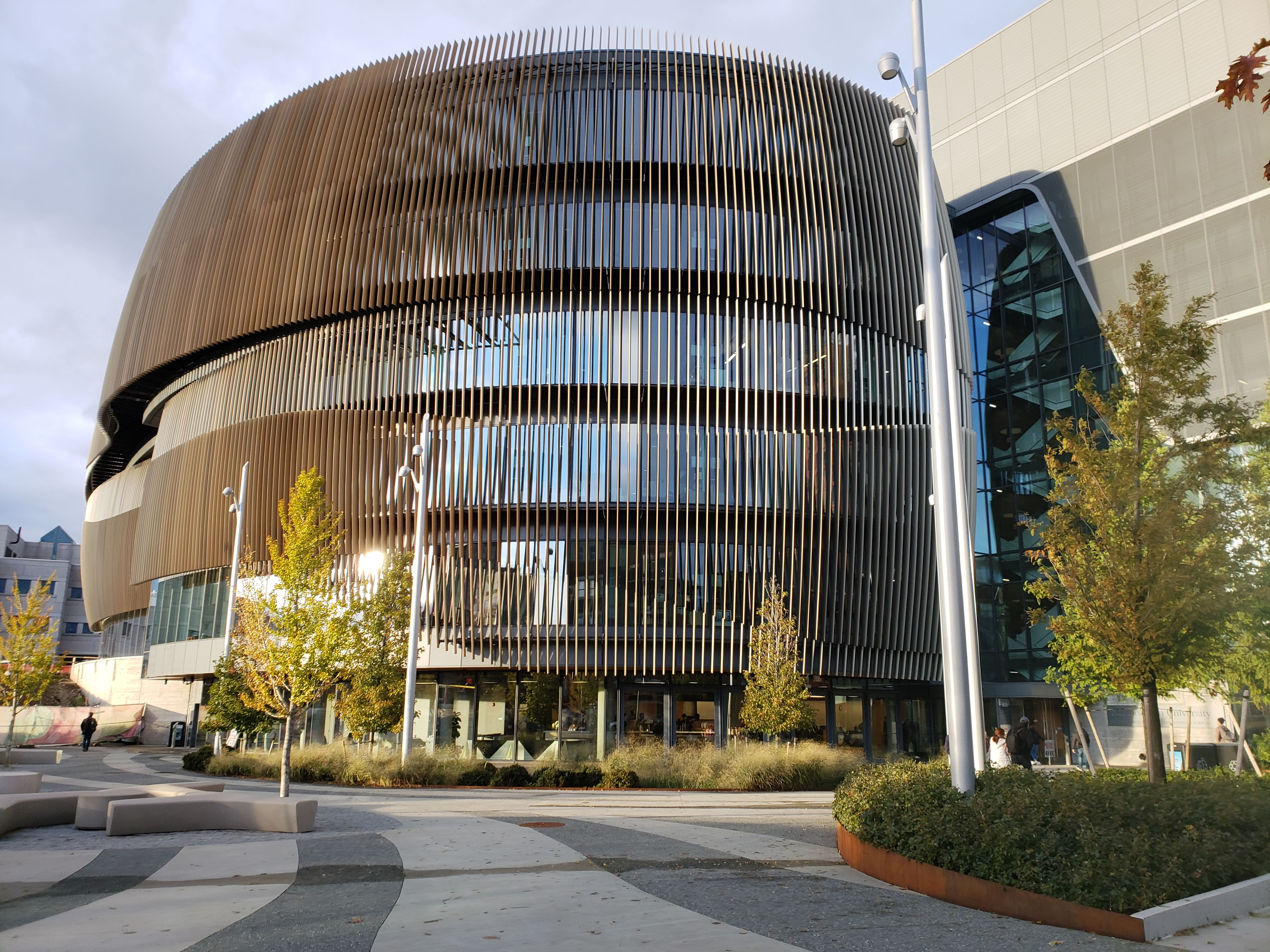
- Exterior of ISEC in 2020
- Interactive map of the Interdisciplinary Science and Engineering Complex area

General information
- Type: Research Facility, Classroom, Laboratory
- Location: Boston, Massachusetts, United States
- Coordinates: 42.337694°N 71.086917°W
- Groundbreaking: February 21, 2014
- Completed: April 3, 2017
- Cost: $225 Million (2017)
- Owner: Northeastern University

Technical details
- Floor count: 6
- Floor area: 234,000 square feet (21,700 m^{2})

Design and construction
- Architecture firm: Payette
- Services engineer: Arup Group; LeMessurier Consultants
- Main contractor: Suffolk Construction

Website
- www.northeastern.edu/isec/

The Interdisciplinary Science and Engineering Complex (ISEC) is a 234,000 square-foot (21,700 m^{2}) building at Northeastern University designed for collaborative research, laboratory access, and classroom learning. The building is located on the University's central campus at 805 Columbus Ave, Boston, Massachusetts. The building initially opened on April 3, 2017.

In 2019 the building won an AIA COTE Top 10 Award.

== History ==
The Interdisciplinary Science and Engineering Complex was first proposed in the 2012 Northeastern University Institutional Master Plan (IMP) draft as a three phase, two building cluster on the existing Columbus lot, a surface parking lot. In the final 2013 version of the document, the complex had been revised to be a three building cluster with an option for a fourth, connected to the main campus by a bridge known as "The Arc". The first building proposed to be constructed in the IMP was known as the Interdisciplinary Science and Engineering Building (ISEB).

In April 2013, Payette was selected as the result of an open design contest to design the first phase of ISEC. Their design focused on an energy efficient building envelope, with a distinctive skin of fixed solar shielding reducing solar insolation. The first building received Boston Planning & Development Agency Board approval in November 2013. The building, now referred to in documents as ISEC, officially broke ground in February 2014, with a scheduled completion date in 2016. Suffolk Construction was the primary contractor, with engineering provided by Arup Group and Vanasse Hangen Brustlin. The building was topped off in June 2016.

The building was materially complete and soft opened in January 2017. The official grand opening took place on April 4, 2017. Researchers, students, faculty, administrators, and executives of various research institutions attended the grand opening along with a protesting student environmental group, DivestNU.

In 2018 the building was awarded the Harleston Parker Medal by the Boston Society of Architects, recognizing it as one of the most beautiful buildings in Boston.

=== Bridge ===
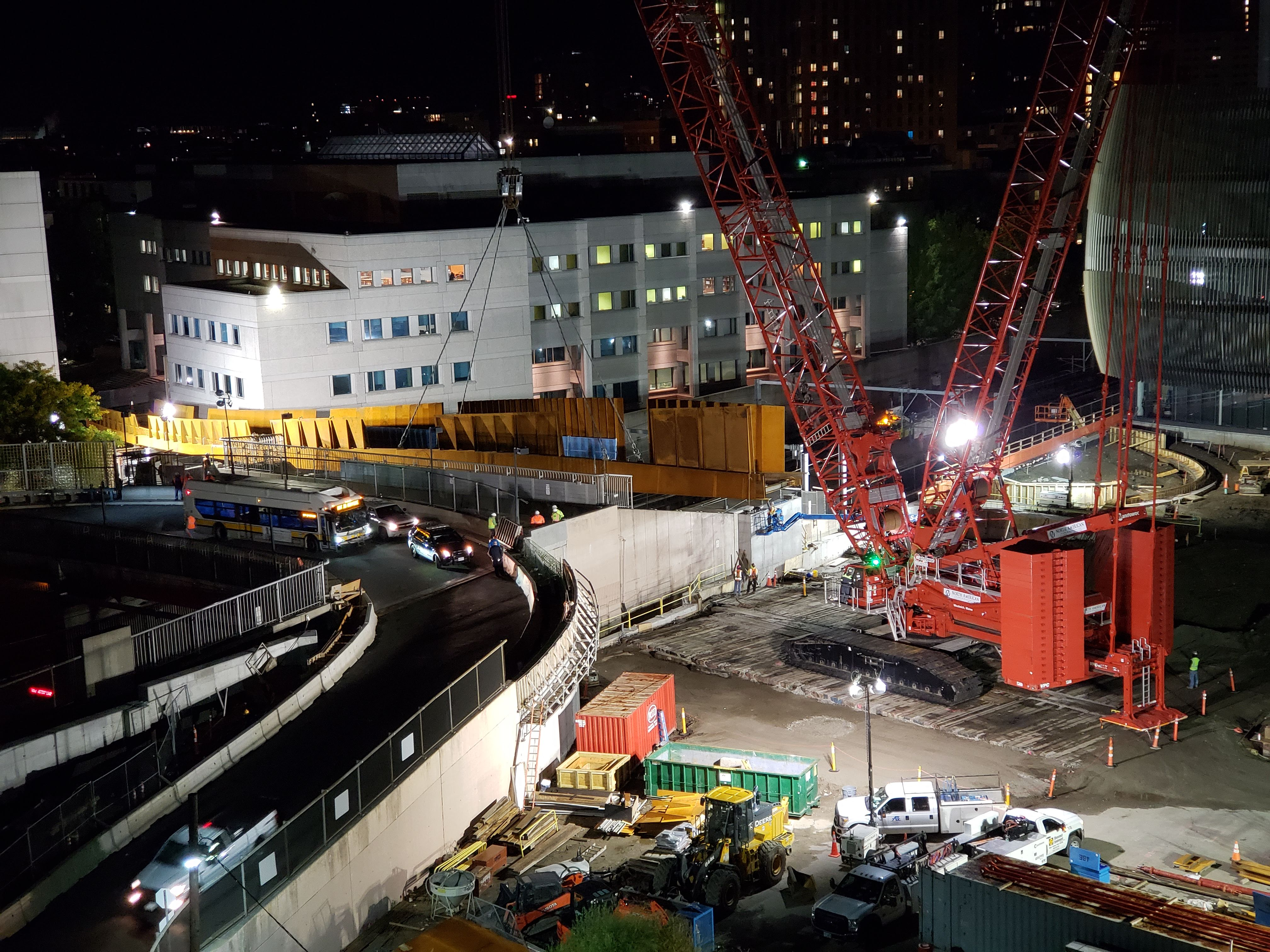
ISEC Pedestrian Bridge being lifted into place in 2018

The rail corridor that serves Amtrak, the Orange Line, and commuter trains makes walking or biking from one side to the other difficult, effectively isolating Northeastern's main campus from the Roxbury neighborhood. To combat this issue, the designers of ISEC included a new public pedestrian bridge that extends from ISEC to the central campus of Northeastern, with accommodations for pedestrians and cyclists. Construction of the 317 foot bridge began in Fall 2017 and was expected to finish in late 2018. The bridge was lifted into place in October 2018, a revised timeline stated the bridge would open in Q1 2019. The bridge opened to the public in June 2019. The bridge received critical acclaim for its unique weathering steel design and lighting design. The bridge was seeking Envision certification from the Institute for Sustainable Infrastructure, and received an Envision Bronze award for sustainable infrastructure in April 2020. The bridge received the 2020 Engineering News-Record New England Award of Merit for Bridges, and won a Design Honor award from the Boston Society of Landscape Architects.

=== EXP ===
The original 2013 Institutional Master Plan that proposed ISEC included three buildings in the complex. In May 2019, Northeastern proposed a single second building that would complete the complex, EXP, with plans to begin construction in early 2020. The 350,000 sq ft new building was anticipated to take three years to complete and includes dynamic research spaces for driverless cars and humanoid robots. The building was approved by the Boston Planning and Development Agency in October 2019. Construction began in early 2020, but was delayed due to the COVID-19 pandemic. Construction continued in August 2020, with an estimated construction cost of $218,245,000. The building opened in Fall 2023.

== Design ==
ISEC has 6 stories consisting of labs, classrooms, offices, conference rooms, and research facilities. The first floor consists of two 50-seat lecture halls, two 50-seat active learning classrooms, a bicycle storage room, a 24-seat biomaterials teaching lab, a cafe, and a 280-seat auditorium. The building also has a central atrium which extends through all 6 floors and contains the main spiral staircase. Floors 2–5 house an array of experimental labs on the rectangular half of the building and contain offices and conference rooms on the rounded half of the building across the atrium. The 6th floor is structurally similar to floors 2–5, but house computational research facilities in place of the laboratories. The north corner of floors 3–6 contain a computational research room, and floor 2 has a lab classroom in the same corner.

The ISEC building was constructed for collaboration and research. The central body of the building consists of a large atrium that extends from the ground floor to the six-story ceiling. Much of the research space which borders this main atrium is completely visible to observers, allowing for high levels of transparency between the public and different disciplines. Open spaces of collaboration and "research on display" define much of the complex.

ISEC was constructed on an urban brownfield site that was formerly a parking lot set between the Columbus Ave and Renaissance Park Garages. The building achieved a LEED Gold certification in 2018, using 78% less energy than a traditional lab building. The building also has a rainwater retention system that harvests rainwater and uses it to supply 57% of the flushing needs in the building.

== Influence and impact ==
The Boston Globe noted that the completion of the ISEC facility was the culmination of a major shift in the culture, history, and trajectory of Northeastern University. In the past ten years, the university's federal research funding has more than doubled, to the current $130 million a year, and Northeastern has hired 565 new tenured and tenure-track faculty in disciplines directly tied to its research goals since the 2006–2007 academic year. The ISEC building represented a $225 million piece of the $1.6 billion master plan for development proposed by Northeastern to the Boston Planning & Development Agency in November 2013.

The complex has housed a variety of major research projects. The Human-centered robotics research group develops robots and assistive devices. In partnership with NASA, researchers are programming a 6'2" humanoid, Valkyrie, to explore Mars as soon as 2030, ahead of human explorers. This project represents a collaborative effort between Northeastern University, University of Massachusetts Lowell, and NASA's Johnson Space Center.
