= North Carolina Highway 161 =

State highway in North Carolina, US

North Carolina Highway 161

Route information
- Maintained by NCDOT
- Length: 10.6 mi (17.1 km)
- Existed: 1937–present
- Tourist routes: Crowders Mountain Drive

Major junctions
- South end: SC 161 at the South Carolina state line near Kings Mountain S.P.
- I-85 / US 29 near Kings Mountain; US 74 in Kings Mountain
- North end: NC 274 in Bessemer City

Location
- Country: United States
- State: North Carolina
- Counties: Cleveland, Gaston

Highway system
- North Carolina Highway System; Interstate; US; State; Scenic
← NC 160	→ NC 162

North Carolina Highway 161 (NC 161) is a primary state highway in the U.S. state of North Carolina that connects the city of Kings Mountain, North Carolina to Bessemer City, North Carolina and York, South Carolina.

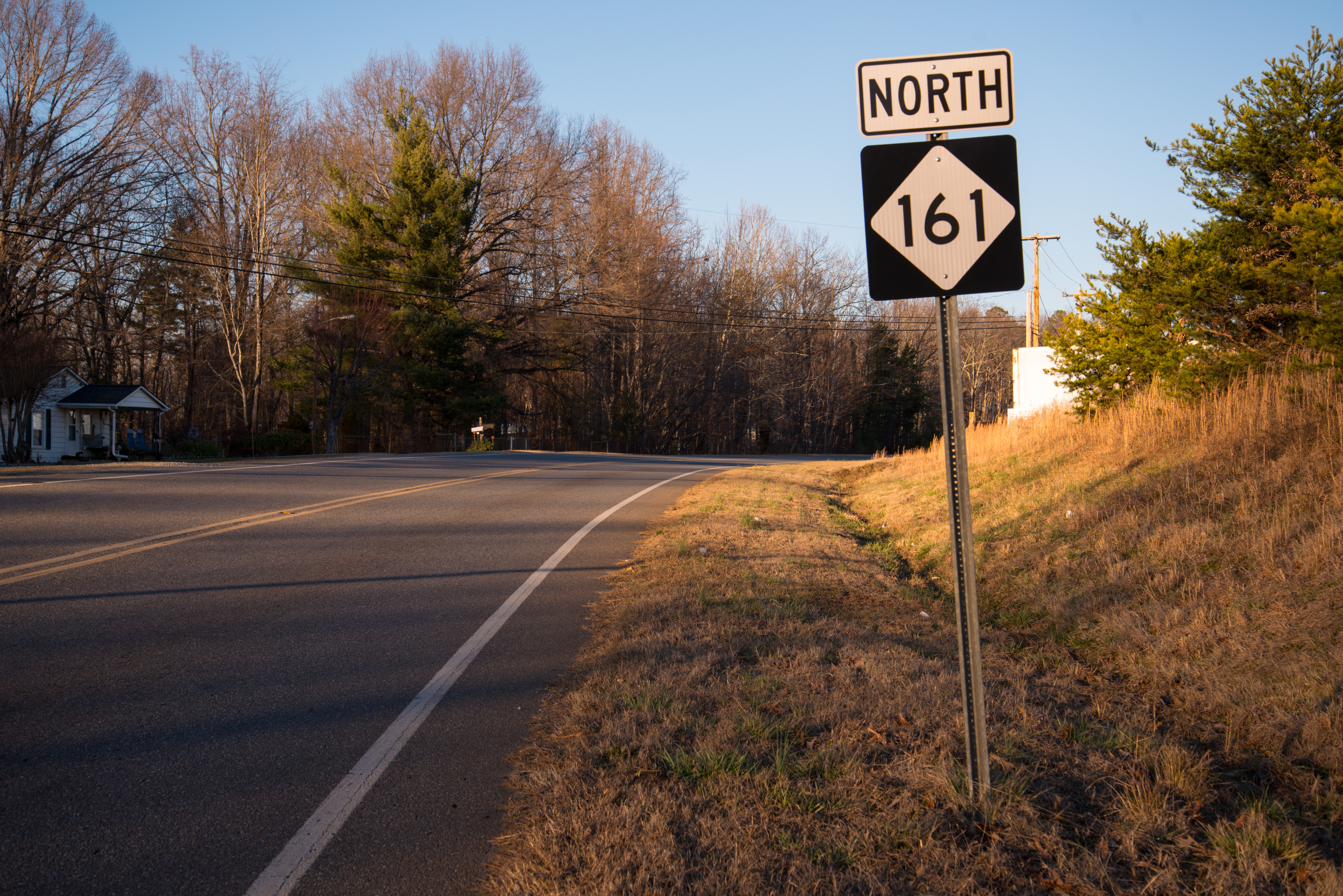
NC 161 in Kings Mountain

== History ==
The first NC 161 was established in 1930 as a new primary routing from Warrensville to the Virginia state line, in Ashe County. In 1937 it was renumbered as NC 162 (and is currently NC 194).

The second and current NC 161 was established in 1937 as a renumbering of NC 215 to match SC 161; it ran from the South Carolina state line to U.S. Route 29 (US 29) and US 74 (now US 74 Business) in Kings Mountain. In 1939, the highway was extended northeast to NC 274 Bessemer City replacing US 29A/US 74A.

== Junction list ==
County	Location	mi	km	Destinations	Notes
Gaston–Cleveland county line		0.0	0.0	SC 161 south – York	South Carolina state line
Cleveland	Kings Mountain	4.6– 4.8	7.4– 7.7	I-85 / US 29 – Gastonia, Gaffney	Exit 8 (I-85)
Cleveland	Kings Mountain	5.8	9.3	US 74 Bus. (East King Street)	
Cleveland	Kings Mountain	6.2– 6.3	10.0– 10.1	US 74 to I-85 – Shelby, Gastonia	Interchange
Gaston	Bessemer City	10.6	17.1	NC 274 (West Virginia Avenue) / North 13th Street – Cherryville, Gastonia	
1.000 mi = 1.609 km; 1.000 km = 0.621 mi
