= Interstate 95 Business (North Carolina) =

Highway in North Carolina

Interstate 95 Business
- I-95 Bus. highlighted in green

Route information
- Business route of I-95
- Maintained by NCDOT
- Length: 16 mi (26 km)
- Existed: May 1978–present

Major junctions
- South end: I-95 near Hope Mills
- North end: I-95 in Eastover

Location
- Country: United States
- State: North Carolina
- Counties: Cumberland

Highway system
- Interstate Highway System; Main; Auxiliary; Suffixed; Business; Future; North Carolina Highway System; Interstate; US; State; Scenic

Interstate 95 Business (I-95 Bus.) is a business loop of I-95 entirely within Cumberland County, North Carolina. It runs from nearby Hope Mills to Eastover, passing through the eastern side of downtown Fayetteville.

== Route description ==
The entire route, except for two short segments at its northern and southern termini, is concurrent with US Highway 301 (US 301). The 16-mile (26 km) route is partly an expressway and is an urban boulevard in downtown Fayetteville. In downtown Fayetteville, I-95 Bus. is cosigned as Eastern Boulevard.

At each terminus, access from I-95 Bus. to I-95 is limited. For example, at the southern terminus, drivers on I-95 Bus. heading south can only merge with I-95 south, while, at the northern terminus, drivers on I-95 Bus. heading north can only merge with I-95 north.

== History ==
By 1973, I-95 was largely complete in North Carolina. In the two remaining incomplete sections, one around Fayetteville and the other around Wilson and Rocky Mount, traffic was routed over four-lane divided stretches of US 301. Much of these "Temporary I-95" routes were lined with businesses catering to the heavy through traffic. Local businesses in Fayetteville opposed the state's proposed route bypassing the city and counterproposed an urban route. Despite appeals to the US Supreme Court, their efforts failed but delayed completion of I-95 around Fayetteville.

In anticipation of the completion of the final two sections of I-95, the "Temporary I-95" routes were both designated I-95 Bus. in May 1978. The route through Fayetteville initially entirely overlapped with US 301 connecting an incomplete gap from nearby Hope Mills (exit 40) to Eastover (exit 56). When I-95 east of Fayetteville was completed in April 1980, I-95 Bus. was extended to meet the new freeway. Large signs at the entrances of I-95 Bus. were erected to promote the businesses that were bypassed along the mainline.

== Junction list ==
The entire route is in Cumberland County.

Location	mi	km	Destinations	Notes
	0.0	0.0	I-95 – Dunn, Benson, Lumberton	
	0.8	1.3	US 301 south – St. Pauls	South end of US 301 overlap
Hope Mills	1.5	2.4	To I-95 / Main Street – Hope Mills	
Ardalusa			NC 162 west (Elk Road) – Southview Schools	
Fayetteville	8.5	13.7	NC 87 (Martin Luther King Jr Freeway) – Elizabethtown, Spring Lake	
Fayetteville	10.3	16.6	NC 24 / NC 210 to US 401 (Grove Street) – Roseboro, Spring Lake	
Fayetteville	11.5	18.5	Middle Road	
Fayetteville	13.5	21.7	Dobbin Holmes Road	
Eastover	15.0	24.1	US 301 north (Dunn Road) – Wade	North end of US 301 overlap
Eastover	16.0	25.7	I-95 – Dunn, Benson, Lumberton	
1.000 mi = 1.609 km; 1.000 km = 0.621 mi: Concurrency terminus

== Former Wilson–Rocky Mount Interstate 95 Business ==
Interstate 95 Business
- Location: Wilson–Rocky Mount
- Length: 44.6 mi (71.8 km)
- Existed: May 1978–January 1986

In anticipation of the completion of the penultimate stretch of I-95 in North Carolina, bypassing the cities of Wilson and Rocky Mount, the former "Temporary I-95", consisting largely of parallel US 301, was designated I-95 Bus. in May 1978. In November of that year, that section of I-95 was completed.

I-95 Bus. traversed 44.6 miles (71.8 km) from Kenly (exit 107) to Gold Rock (exit 145). The route ran concurrently with US 301 from Kenly through Wilson and Rocky Mount to just south of Battleboro, and it then proceeded alone over a four-lane divided connector road back onto mainline I-95 (the former North Carolina Highway 1522 [NC 1522]). Large signs at the entrances of I-95 Bus. were erected to promote the businesses that were bypassed along the mainline.

In January 1986, I-95 Bus. was decommissioned; NC 4 was extended onto the connector road from Gold Rock to its current southern terminus at US 301 south of Battleboro. Until 2022, a sign was still in place showing a slightly covered part of the I-95 Bus. shield, but it was replaced as a part of a major widening project of I-95 between exits 101 to 107.

=== Gallery ===
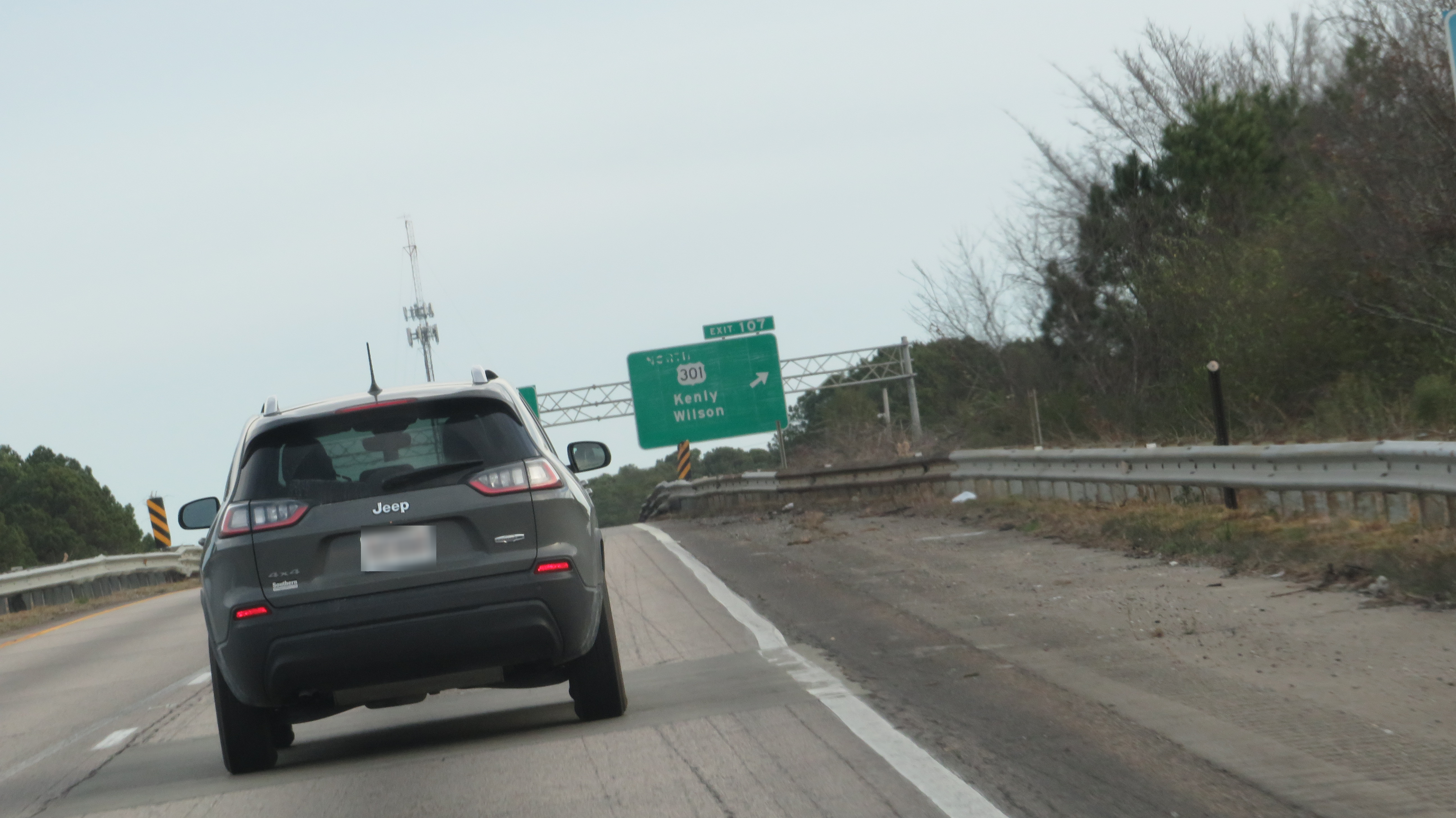
Before July 2022, a sign showing a slightly covered part of the I-95 Bus. shield with the words "NORTH"

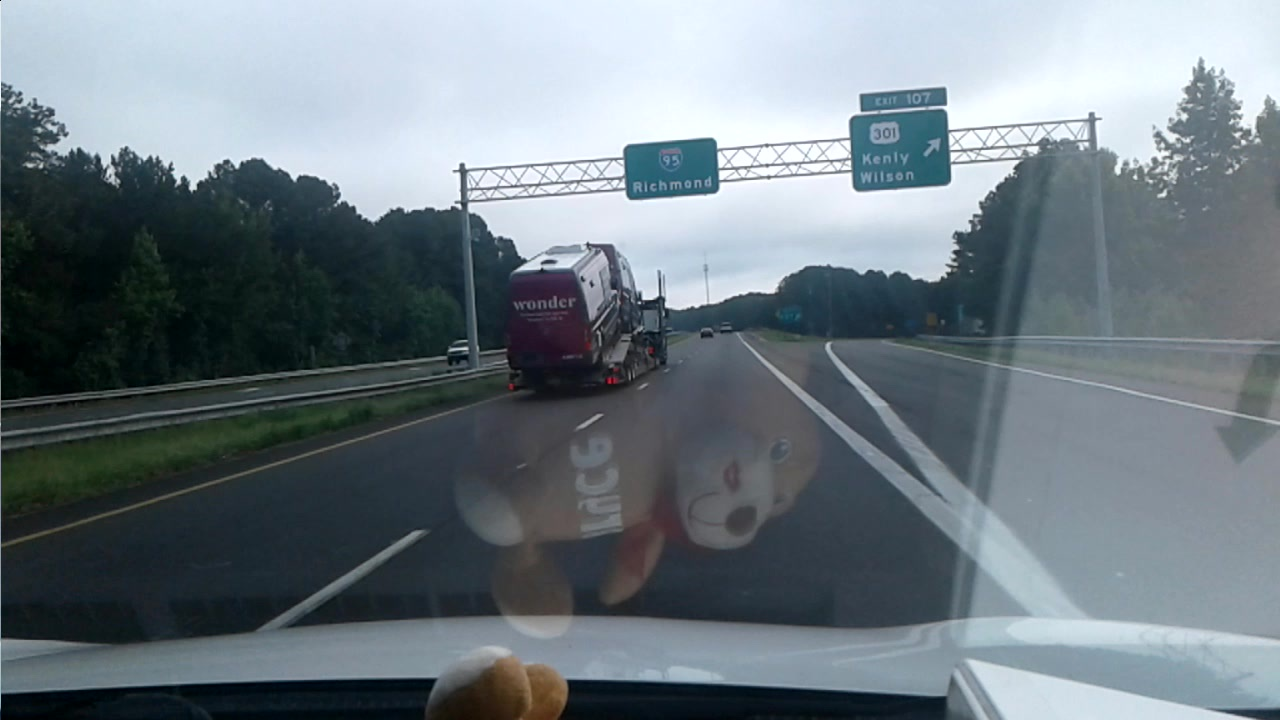
After a widening project, the replacement sign erasing the final legacy of the route

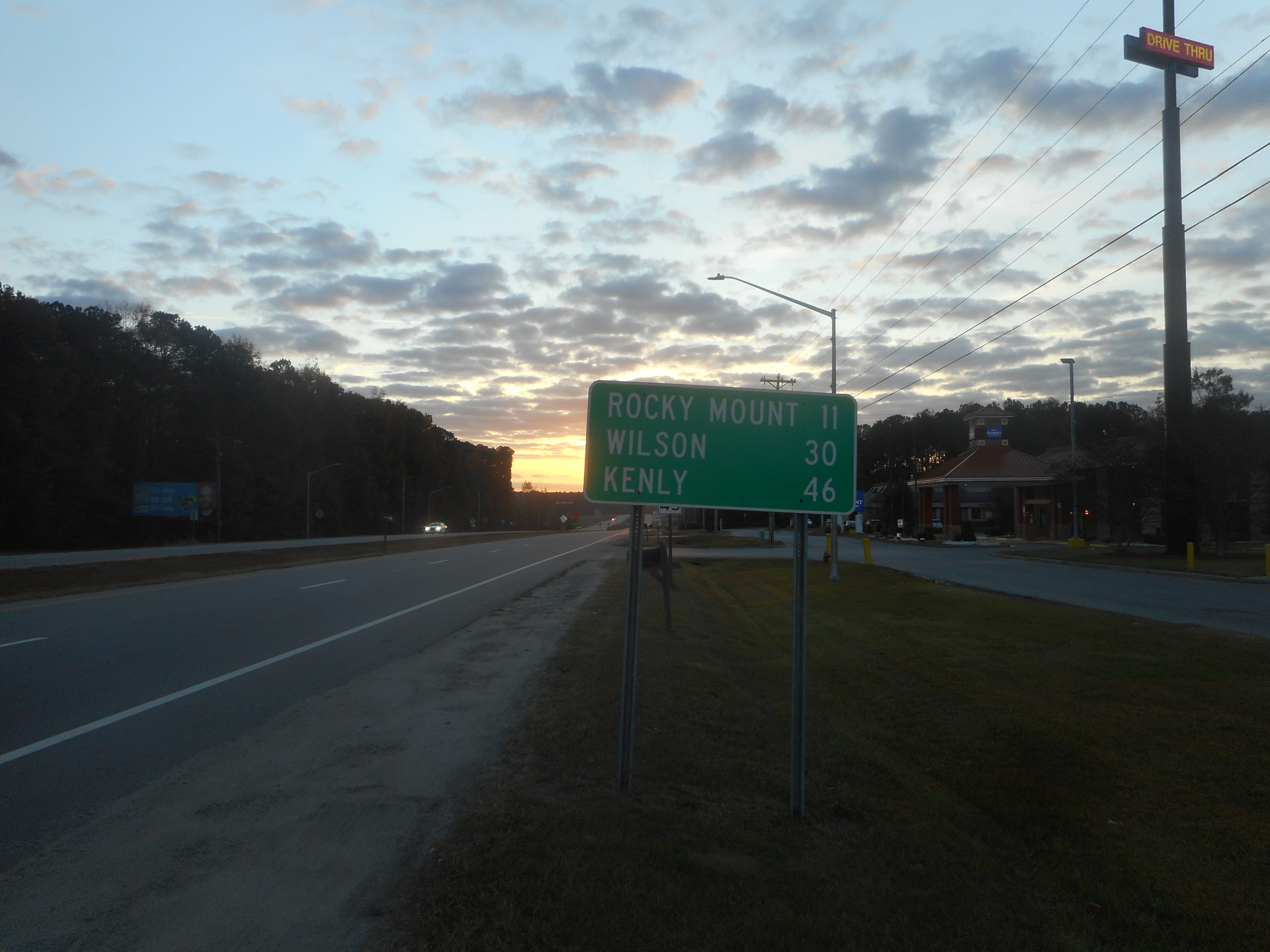
Southbound NC 4 near Rocky Mount, where the destination sign still shows Wilson and Kenly.

== See also ==
- Interstate 295 (North Carolina), a full loop around western Fayetteville
