= Crowder Construction Company =

- Type: Private
- Industry: General Contractor (construction)
- Founded: 1947
- Founders: O. P. and W.T. Crowder
- Headquarters: Charlotte, North Carolina, U.S.
- Services: General Construction; Design-Build
- Number of employees: 900 - 1100 (2019)
- Website: www.crowderusa.com

The old logo of Crowder Construction.

Crowder Construction Company is a privately owned General Contracting, and Design-Build service provider. Founded in 1947 by O. P. and W.T. Crowder, Crowder Construction Company is headquartered in Charlotte, North Carolina.

Crowder is ranked among the top 400 contractors by Engineering News-Record.

== History ==
In 1947, brothers O. P. and W.T. Crowder concluded their initial undertaking, which involved constructing a sidewalk for a church. Within a span of fewer than ten years, they assembled a workforce comprising 40 individuals and embarked on Crowder's inaugural significant endeavor in highway construction – the construction of a bridge located in Charlotte, North Carolina. As the Company grew, O. P. and W.T. moved to larger heavy civil and environmental projects including water and wastewater treatment plants. Crowder expanded its operations in the early 1990s to include mechanical and industrial projects. Crowder opened offices in Apex, North Carolina and Spartanburg, South Carolina, creating two new divisions of operation.

Company executives include Otis Crowder, son of O.P. Crowder, as chief executive officer and Bill Crowder Jr., son of W.T. Crowder, as chief operating officer.

== Divisions ==
=== Civil & Environmental ===
Centered in Apex, North Carolina focuses on Wastewaster Treatment Plants, Water Treatment Plants, Pump Stations and Electrical Projects. Regional Offices located in Roswell, Georgia and Midlothian, Virginia..

=== Heavy Civil ===
Located in Charlotte, NC focuses on Bridges, Dams, Pedestrian Trails, Tunnels, Pile Driving, Shoring, and Deep Excavations.

=== Industrial ===
Located in Spartanburg, SC focuses on Power Stations and Metal Fabrication.

=== Energy Services ===
Located in Apex, NC focuses on Renewable Energy Solutions.

== Charitable Contributions ==
Otis Crowder, owner of Crowder Construction Company, is a frequent donor to nonprofit housing causes, including Heal Charlotte.
