= Institute for Sustainable Infrastructure =

501(c)(3) non-profit organization

- Company type: Non-profit Organization
- Industry: Infrastructure
- Founded: Washington, DC United States (2010)
- Headquarters: Washington, DC United States
- Key people: Anthony Kane, President & CEO
- Number of employees: 15
- Website: https://sustainableinfrastructure.org/

The Institute for Sustainable Infrastructure (ISI) is a 501(c)(3) non-profit organization founded by the American Public Works Association (APWA), the American Society of Civil Engineers (ASCE), and the American Council of Engineering Companies (ACEC) in 2010. The organization was created to develop and maintain a sustainability framework and rating system for all civil infrastructure.

== Envision Sustainable Infrastructure Framework ==
ISI maintains and administers the Envision sustainable infrastructure framework. The framework is published online and tools like the Envision Guidance Manual and pre-assessment checklist can be used at no cost. There are costs associated with requesting a third-party review of a project to receive "verification."

ISI offers a related Envision Sustainability Professional Credential (ENV SP). Candidates are required to complete the official ENV SP training and pass a comprehensive exam.
