= Hope Mills, North Carolina =

- Town
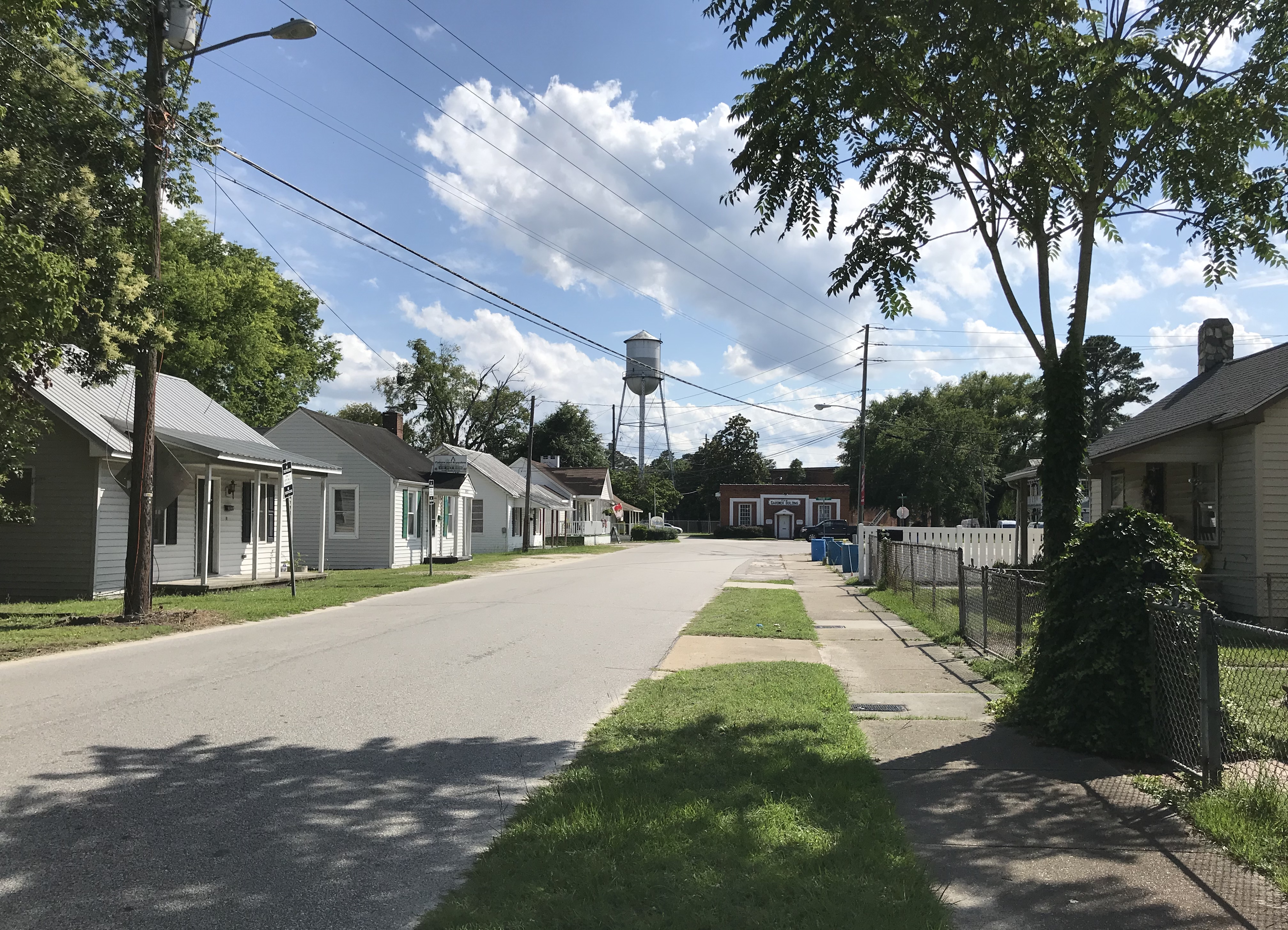
- Street in Hope Mills (2020)

- Logo

- Location within Cumberland County and North Carolina
- Coordinates: 34°58′12″N 78°57′32″W
- Country: United States
- State: North Carolina
- County: Cumberland

Government
  - Mayor: Jessie Bellflowers

Area
  - Total: 8.64 sq mi (22.38 km^{2})
  - Land: 8.48 sq mi (21.96 km^{2})
  - Water: 0.16 sq mi (0.42 km^{2})
- Elevation: 157 ft (48 m)

Population (2020)
  - Total: 17,808
  - Density: 2,100/sq mi (810.9/km^{2})
- Time zone: UTC−5 (Eastern (EST))
  - Summer (DST): UTC−4 (EDT)
- ZIP Code: 28348
- Area code: 910, 472
- FIPS code: 37-32640
- GNIS ID: 2405861
- Website: townofhopemills.com

Hope Mills is a town in Cumberland County, North Carolina, United States. As of the 2020 census, Hope Mills had a population of 17,808.

== History ==
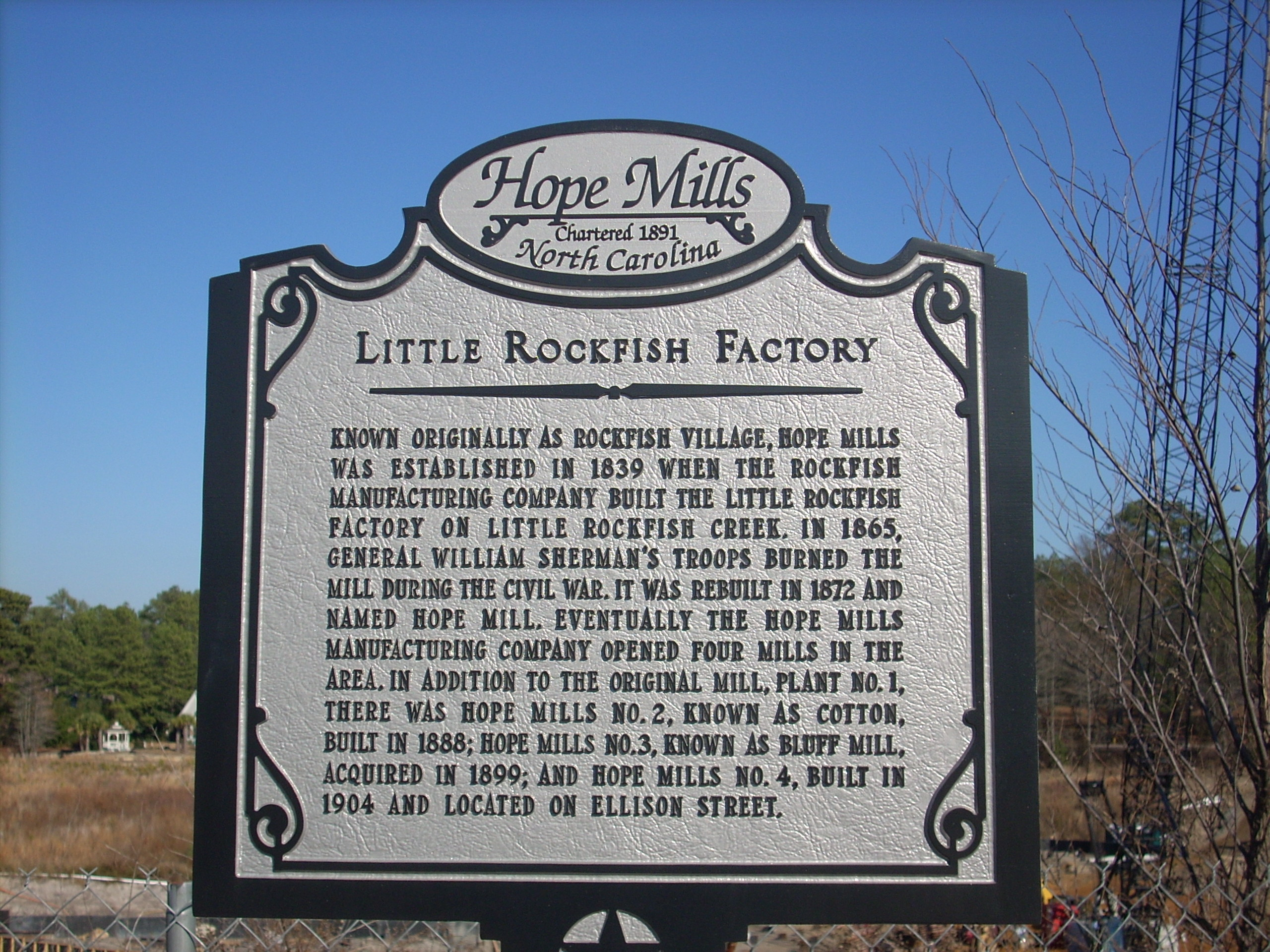

Chartered in 1891, Hope Mills can trace its beginning back to 1766, when due to the wealth of natural water power and the abundance of timber, a lumber camp, saw mill, grist mill, and pottery business were established. In 1839, construction of the first cotton mill powered by the Hope Mills Dam was completed and was the beginning of a new era for the town. Much of the heritage and the town's name itself can be attributed to the cotton-milling industry that followed.

Before it was known as Hope Mills, the area was known as Little Rockfish Village and as Hope Mills Number One.

The local cotton mill and many other buildings were burned by General Sherman's troops during the Civil War.

The Big Rockfish Presbyterian Church and Hope Mills Historic District are listed on the National Register of Historic Places.

=== 21st century ===
While the town is small, it offers its residents a full variety of services and recreation. Public parks and recreational facilities are located throughout the town. These facilities provide walking trails to tennis courts. Hope Mills has its own police and fire departments and is only minutes away from four major hospitals. The new county library provides a number of special services, including summer reading programs and public meeting rooms. Five shopping centers, the historic downtown district, a post office, two medical clinics, elementary schools (Baldwin, Rockfish, Collier, and Cashwell), middle schools (South View and Hope Mills), two high schools (South View and Gray's Creek) and more than 20 churches round out the community.

== Geography ==
Hope Mills is located in western Cumberland County south of Fayetteville, the county seat. The town center is next to a dam on Little Rockfish Creek, forming Hope Mills Lake. Little Rockfish Creek flows southeast to Rockfish Creek, a tributary of the Cape Fear River.

North Carolina Highway 59 (Main Street) runs through the center of the town, leading north 5 miles (8 km) to U.S. Route 401 in western Fayetteville, and south 2.5 miles (4.0 km) to Interstate 95 at Exit 41. Several pieces of land around Exit 41 are within the town limits, although not connected to the town center.

According to the United States Census Bureau, the town has a total area of 7.0 square miles (18.2 km^{2}), of which 6.9 square miles (18.0 km^{2}) are land and 0.08 square miles (0.2 km^{2}), or 1.40%, is covered by water, including Hope Mills Lake.

== Demographics ==
Historical population
Census	Pop.	Note	%±
1890	456		—
1900	881		93.2%
1910	964		9.4%
1920	783		−18.8%
1930	971		24.0%
1940	900		−7.3%
1950	1,077		19.7%
1960	1,109		3.0%
1970	1,866		68.3%
1980	5,412		190.0%
1990	8,184		51.2%
2000	11,237		37.3%
2010	15,176		35.1%
2020	17,808		17.3%
2025 (est.)	18,324	▲	2.9%
U.S. Decennial Census

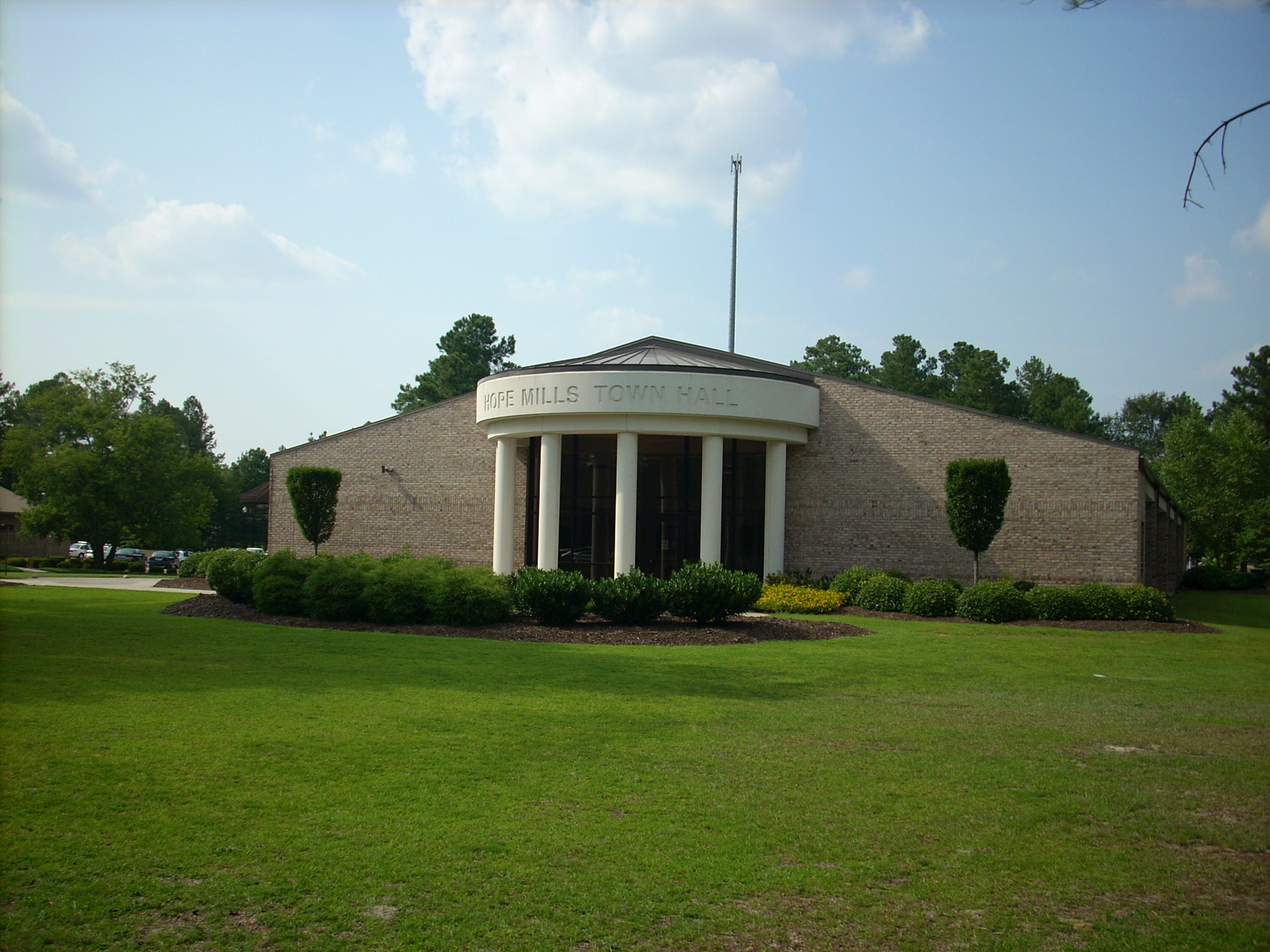
Hope Mills Town Hall (2007)

=== 2020 census ===
As of the 2020 census, there were 17,808 people, 5,759 households, and 3,834 families residing in the town. The median age was 34.7 years. 27.0% of residents were under the age of 18 and 11.3% of residents were 65 years of age or older. For every 100 females there were 83.7 males, and for every 100 females age 18 and over there were 78.5 males age 18 and over.

99.4% of residents lived in urban areas, while 0.6% lived in rural areas.

Of households in Hope Mills, 40.4% had children under the age of 18 living in them. Of all households, 44.9% were married-couple households, 14.2% were households with a male householder and no spouse or partner present, and 35.7% were households with a female householder and no spouse or partner present. About 24.9% of all households were made up of individuals and 8.4% had someone living alone who was 65 years of age or older.

There were 7,060 housing units, of which 5.9% were vacant. The homeowner vacancy rate was 2.3% and the rental vacancy rate was 5.4%.

Hope Mills racial composition
Race	Number	Percentage
White or Caucasian (non-Hispanic)	7,686	43.16%
Black or African American (non-Hispanic)	5,804	32.59%
Native American	285	1.6%
Asian	409	2.3%
Pacific Islander	49	0.28%
Other/Mixed	1,402	7.87%
Hispanic or Latino	2,173	12.2%

=== 2000 census ===
As of the census of 2000, 11,237 people, 4,112 households, and 3,108 families were living in the town. The population density was 1,844.6 inhabitants per square mile (712.2/km^{2}). The 4,497 housing units averaged 738.2 per square mile (285.1/km^{2}). The racial makeup of the town was 73.04% White, 17.61% African American, 2.03% Native American, 1.26% Asian, 0.21% Pacific Islander, 2.77% from other races, and 3.08% from two or more races. Hispanics or Latinos of any race were 6.40% of the population.

Of the 4,112 households, 46.4% had children under the age of 18 living with them, 54.0% were married couples living together, 17.4% had a female householder with no husband present, and 24.4% were not families. About 19.7% of all households were made up of individuals, and 5.3% had someone living alone who was 65 years of age or older. The average household size was 2.73, and the average family size was 3.13.

In the town, the age distribution was 32.1% under 18, 8.2% from 18 to 24, 37.0% from 25 to 44, 16.8% from 45 to 64, and 5.8% who were 65 or older. The median age was 31 years. For every 100 females, there were 90.4 males. For every 100 females age 18 and over, there were 85.9 males.

The median income for a household in the town was $40,697, and for a family was $44,866. Males had a median income of $34,120 versus $21,845 for females. The per capita income for the town was $16,534. About 5.7% of families and 7.8% of the population were below the poverty line, including 8.7% of those under age 18 and 13.7% of those age 65 or over.

== Notable people ==
- Jeremy Cox, National Football League running back
- Victor Fontanez, barber and social media personality
- Quanera Hayes, Olympic sprinter
- John T. Henley, politician
- Richard Holmes, Canadian Football League running back
- Cal Koonce, Major League Baseball pitcher
- Alex Warner, politician

== Gallery ==
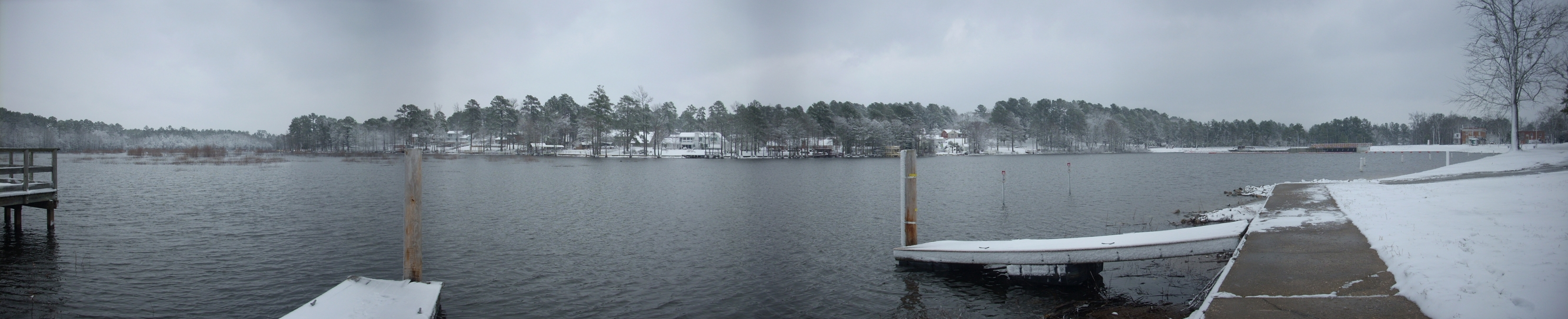
Hope Mills Lake, January 2009, after a rare snowfall
