= List of Primitive Baptist churches =

List of Reformed Baptist churches beginning in the 19th century

This is a list of Primitive Baptist churches that are notable. In the United States, these include:

- Abbott's Creek Primitive Baptist Church, Thomasville, NC
- Bear Grass Primitive Baptist Church, Bear Grass, NC
- Beards Creek Primitive Baptist Church, Glennville, GA
- Beesley Primitive Baptist Church, Murfreesboro, TN
- Cane Springs Primitive Baptist Church, College Hill, KY
- Goshen Primitive Baptist Church, Winchester, KY
- Hannah's Creek Primitive Baptist Church, Benson, NC
- Kehukee Primitive Baptist Church, Scotland Neck, NC
- Mount Zion Old School Baptist Church, Aldie, VA
- Primitive Baptist Church, Nashville, TN
- Primitive Baptist Church of Brookfield, Slate Hill, NY
- Providence Primitive Baptist Church, Walter Hill, TN
- Red Banks Primitive Baptist Church, Bell Fork, NC
- Republican Primitive Baptist Church, Haywood County, TN
- Robersonville Primitive Baptist Church, Robersonville, NC
- St. Thomas Primitive Baptist Church, Summit, OK
- Shady Grove Primitive Baptist Church, Gainesville, FL
- Shiloh Primitive Baptist Church, Brogden, NC
- Skewarkey Primitive Baptist Church, Williamston, NC
- Smithwick's Creek Primitive Baptist Church, Farmlife, Martin County, NC
- Spring Green Primitive Baptist Church, Hamilton, NC
- Welsh Tract Baptist Church, Newark, DE
- Wheelers Primitive Baptist Church, Person County, NC

== See also ==
- List of Baptist churches
- Progressive Primitive Baptists
- Primitive Baptist Universalist – American congregational church
