= Celeste Gold Broughton =

American writer and socialite (1925–2022)

- Born: September 5, 1925; Wilson, North Carolina, U.S.
- Died: March 6, 2022 (aged 96); Raleigh, North Carolina, U.S.
- Education: Vassar College (AB); UNC Chapel Hill (MFA)
- Occupation(s): writer socialite
- Spouse: Robert Bain Broughton
- Children: 2
- Parent(s): John Daniel Gold; Daisy Hendley
- Relatives: Pleasant Daniel Gold (grandfather)

Celeste Gold Broughton (September 5, 1925 – March 6, 2022) was an American writer and socialite. She was the daughter of the writer Daisy Hendley Gold and of the newspaper publisher John Daniel Gold Sr. Her father was the founder of the Wilson Times and her grandfather, Pleasant Daniel Gold, was the founder of the P.D. Gold Publishing Company. A debutante from one of the wealthiest families in Wilson, she attended Vassar College and followed in her family's footsteps pursuing journalism and writing. After graduating, she married Robert Bain Broughton, the son of Governor J. Melville Broughton. She and her husband went through a highly publicized divorce, which left her in financial ruin. She maintained ownership of the family's Raleigh mansion, Broughton House, but the house fell into ruin and was eventually sold off to pay debts. Broughton filed for bankruptcy and was involved in various court cases regarding her debt. She filed multiple lawsuits against the estate of her ex-husband.

== Early life and family ==
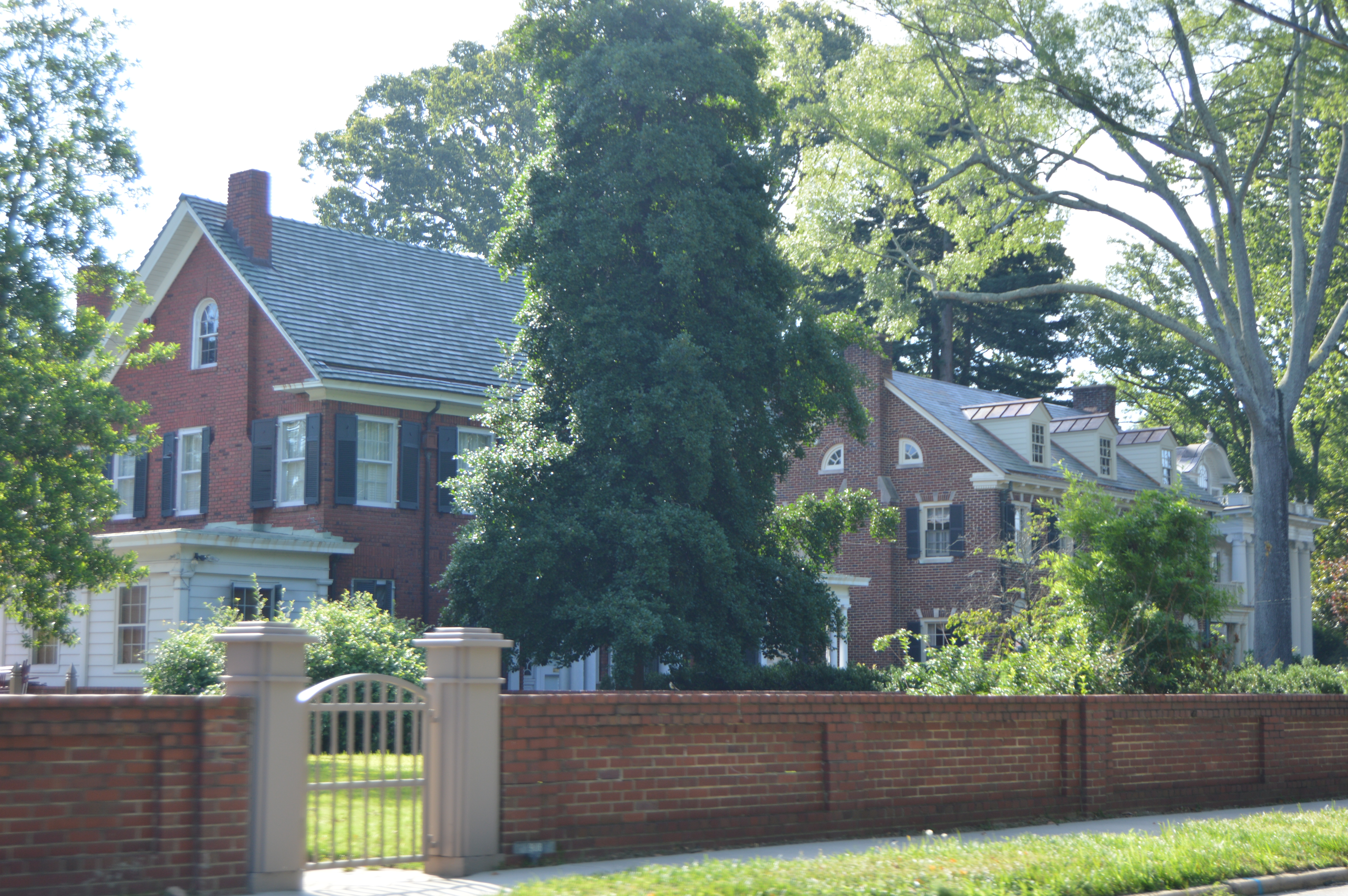
West Nash Street Historic District, the neighborhood where Broughton grew up.

Celeste Gold Broughton was born in Wilson, North Carolina to John Daniel Gold, a newspaper publisher, and Daisy Hendley Gold, a writer and journalist. She was named after her maternal grandmother, Celeste Rimmer Norris Hendley. She is of Scotch-Irish, French, and English descent. Broughton's father was the founder, editor, and publisher of the Wilson Times and one of the wealthiest men in Wilson. Her mother was a poet and novelist who later worked as the managing editor of the Wilson Times. Broughton's paternal grandfather, Pleasant Daniel Gold, founded the family publishing company, P.D. Gold Publishing, and multiple newspapers.

Broughton had one brother, John Daniel Gold Jr., and three stepsisters, Inez, Margaret, and Sarah Elizabeth, from her father's first marriage to Inez White. She grew up at the family home, a Georgian Revival mansion on West Nash Street.

== Education and writing ==
Celeste Gold attended Vassar College, where she was a journalist for the Vassar Chronicle. She reported on student life, college events, and local news including a 1944 Democratic youth rally for Franklin D. Roosevelt at Carnegie Hall. Broughton was also a short story writer and published some of her stories through the college's literary magazine, Vassar Brew, including Diamond City. She graduated from Vassar in 1946. She received positive reviews for her creative writing abilities. She later attended the University of North Carolina at Chapel Hill's Graduate School of English.

== Marriage, family life, and divorce ==
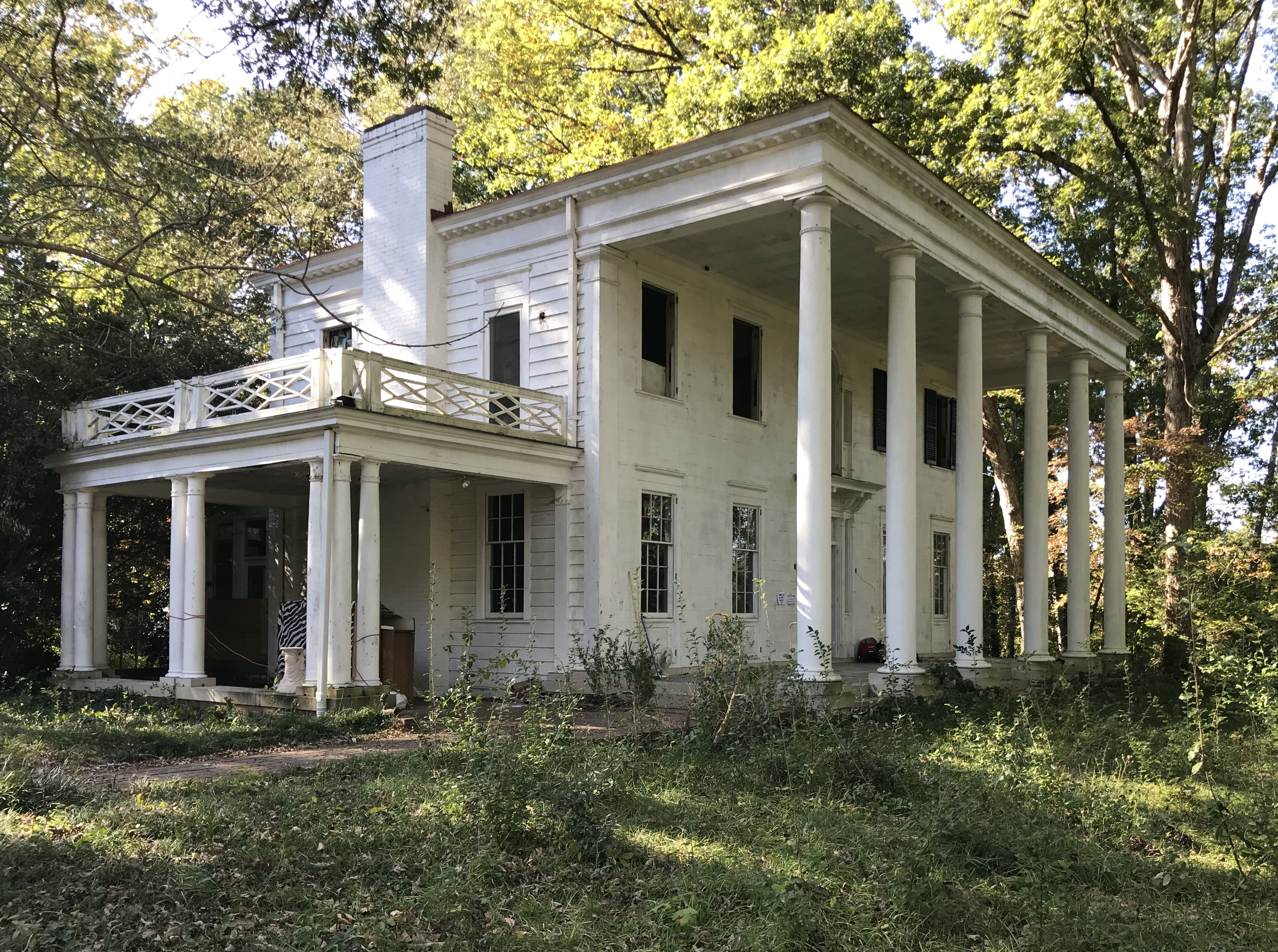
The Broughton's house in Raleigh.

Celeste Gold met Robert Bain Broughton, an attorney who was the son of North Carolina Governor J. Melville Broughton and First Lady Alice Willson Broughton. They married on December 5, 1964, at First Presbyterian Church in Wilson. The wedding was officiated by Rev. Lawrence W. Avent. Broughton wore her mother's pearl-embroidered Chantilly lace and Italian silk wedding dress for the occasion, and donned a coronet of mother of pearl flowers and leaves. She was attended by five flower girls. The Broughtons' engagement and wedding were announced in the New York Times. They had two sons, Robert and Justin.

The Broughtons later had a bitter divorce, with various lawsuits against each other lasting decades. Broughton's husband moved out of their Raleigh Mansion, Broughton House. She remained in the home with their two sons. In 2019, a local bankruptcy court approved the sale of Broughton House to pay off debts accumulated by Broughton after her divorce.

== Death ==
Celeste Gold Broughton died in Raleigh, North Carolina on March 6, 2022, at the age of 96.
