= Laura Belle Barnard =

Missionary, humanitarian, and educator

Personal details
- Born: Laura Belle Barnard; February 13, 1907 Glennville, Georgia
- Died: March 9, 1992 (aged 85) Glennville, Georgia
- Cause of death: Cancer
- Education: Georgia Southern University, Columbia International University
- Occupation: Missionary, humanitarian, and educator

Laura Belle Barnard (February 13, 1907 – March 9, 1992) was an American missionary, humanitarian, and educator. She went on to write The Biblical Basis of Missions.

== Early life and education ==
Laura Belle Barnard was born in Glennville, Georgia, and attended South Georgia Teachers College, which later became known as Georgia Southern University, in Statesboro. After attending South Georgia Teachers College, she transferred to Columbia Bible College, known today as Columbia International University, where she graduated with a master's degree in 1932. It was shortly after her graduation that she discovered her calling for evangelical mission work.

== Career ==
Laura Belle Barnard became the first missionary in the newly formed denomination of the National Association of Free Will Baptists. The group was created when the General Conference merged with the Cooperative General Association of Free Will Baptists. In the summer of 1935, Barnard started her mission work in Kotagiri, South India. While working in Kotagiri, Barnard spent most of her time working among the "untouchables", the lowest known class in the antiquated Hindu caste system. She studied the Indian culture and began learning the local Tamil language. The church she worked in remains to this day.

In the early 1940s, Barnard moved back to the United States and took up residence in Nashville, Tennessee. There, she worked as a secretary and a professor of missions for a brief period of time at Free Will Baptist Bible College. Delayed by World War II, Barnard eventually returned to India in 1945 and stayed there until 1957. During Barnard's second stint in India she partnered with the Woolseys (1947), the Cronks (1948), Zalene Lloyd (1948), Volena Wilson (1951), and the Hannas (1952) in establishing two schools, four churches, and work for various ministries.

When she returned to the United States in 1957, she went back to school to finish her master's degree. Upon completion she took another job as a professor at the Free Will Baptist Bible College. Barnard worked there until she retired in 1972. Over the years, Barnard wrote several books, including The Biblical Basis of Missions, published by Randall House Publications; His Name Among All Nations, a theology of missions published in 1956; and Touching the Untouchables, her autobiography, published in 1985.

== Personal life and death ==
Laura Belle Barnard retired where she was born, in her hometown of Glennville, Georgia. While there, she continued her work in various ministries. Barnard eventually received recognition from the Glennville Chamber of Commerce for her humanitarian work offering aid to Mexican migrant workers. She died from cancer in Glennville, Georgia, on March 9, 1992.
