= Primitive Baptist Conference of New Brunswick, Maine and Nova Scotia =

The Primitive Baptist Conference of New Brunswick, Maine and Nova Scotia, not to be confused with Calvinistic Primitive Baptists, are a group of Free Baptists in Canada and New England.

== History ==
The roots of the Primitive Baptist Conference are found in the work of Benjamin Randall, whose convert Asa McCray was instrumental in forming churches in Nova Scotia. These churches were generally known as Free Christian Baptists.

George Wightfield Orser (1813–1885) was ordained among the Free Christian Baptists in 1843. As the idea of salaried ministers developed and grew, Orser stood against the practice, proposing belief in "a free gospel and free access to it." Other items of disagreement included Sunday Schools, church discipline, missionary organizations, music, and church offerings. Because of this opposition, Orser was expelled from the Free Christian Baptists in 1874. In July 1875, representatives from seven churches met and formed the Free Baptist Conference of New Brunswick. Due to disagreements over the use of the name "Free Baptist", Orser's group incorporated under the name Primitive Baptist Conference of New Brunswick in 1898. As churches were added from Nova Scotia, Maine and Massachusetts, the conference became the Primitive Baptist Conference of New Brunswick, Maine and Nova Scotia. The Nova Scotia churches incorporated a regional conference -- Primitive Baptist Conference of Nova Scotia—in 1926.

In July 1981, 16 churches joined the Free Will Baptists and became the regional Atlantic Canada Association of Free Will Baptists in alignment with the National Association of Free Will Baptists. A small group of Christians from these churches have maintained themselves separately as Primitive Baptists.
