= Broughton House, Raleigh =

Mansion in Raleigh, North Carolina

Broughton House
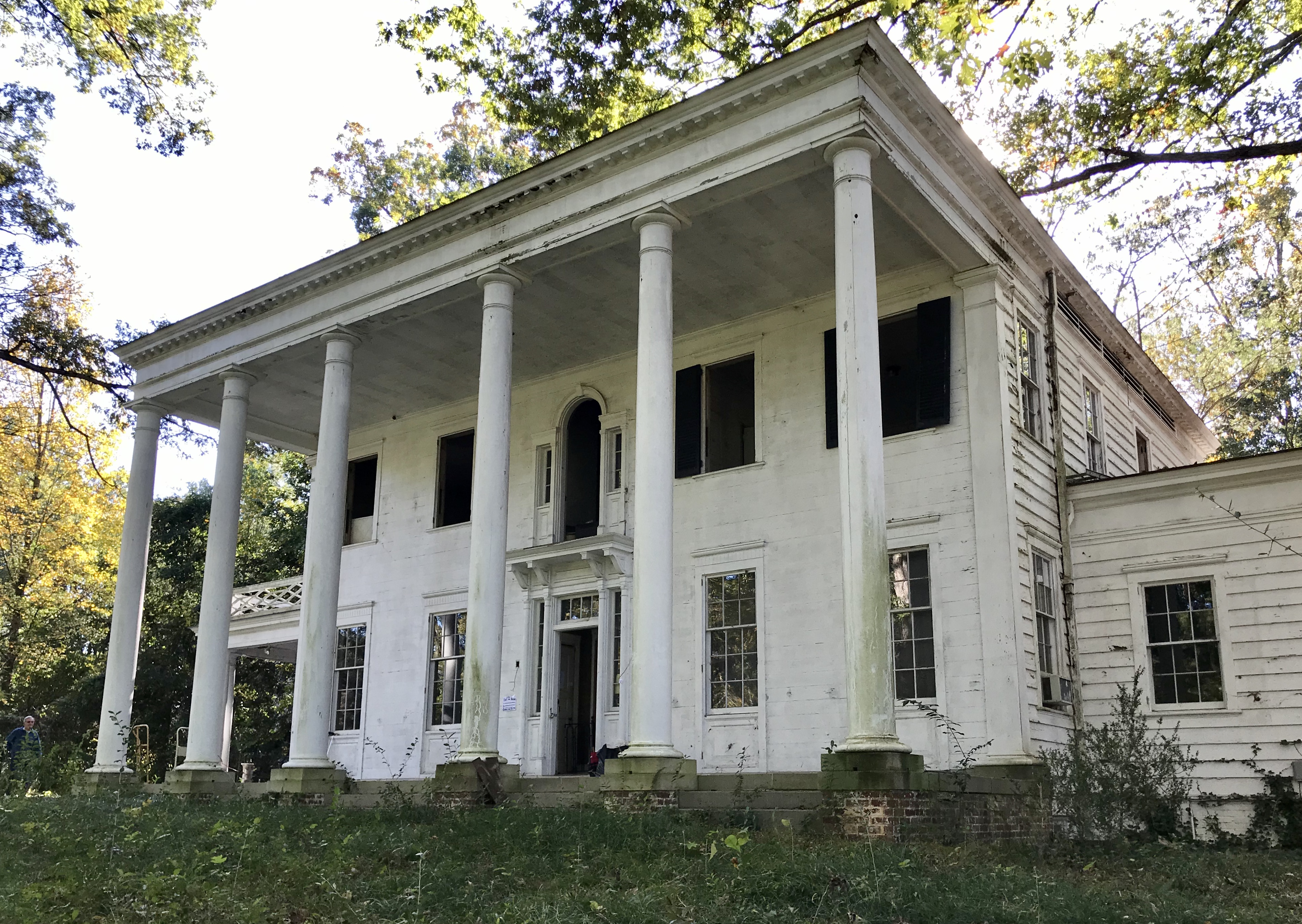
- The house in November 2020

General information
- Status: Demolished
- Type: private residence
- Architectural style: Colonial Revival
- Location: Raleigh, North Carolina, U.S.
- Completed: 1938
- Demolished: 2020
- Owner: Irving F. Hall; Robert Bain Broughton; Celeste Gold Broughton

The Broughton House was a Colonial Revival-style mansion located in the Anderson Heights Historic District in Raleigh, North Carolina. Previously owned by Robert Bain Broughton and Celeste Gold Broughton, the son and daughter-in-law of North Carolina Governor J. Melville Broughton, the house was sold at an auction by Sotheby's in 2019 and demolished in 2020.

== History ==
In 1936 Irving F. Hall, the president of State Capital Life Insurance Company, and his wife, Olive Hall, purchased ten lots along White Oak Road in the Anderson Heights neighborhood in Raleigh. Construction on the house, situated on the three highest plots of land on the property, finished in 1938. The house was built in the Colonial Revival style. The Halls sold the home to a Raleigh physician in 1950. It was sold again in 1960. In 1965 the house was purchased by Robert Bain Broughton and Celeste Gold Broughton. Broughton was the son of Alice Willson Broughton and J. Melville Broughton, a United States senator and former Governor of North Carolina, and a grandnephew of Needham B. Broughton, a state senator. His wife was the daughter of publisher John D. Gold and author Daisy Hendley Gold and a granddaughter of publisher Pleasant Daniel Gold. The Broughtons later divorced, and Celeste Gold Broughton stayed in the home with their two sons.

In June 2019 a local bankruptcy court approved the sale of the house to pay debts accumulated by Celeste Gold Broughton. It was sold for $2.1 million to Anuj and Vinita Mittal at a Sotheby's auction in October 2019. The Mittal family decided to have the Broughton House demolished to make way for four new homes to be built on the property, each listed between $900,000 and $1.1 million. To preserve some of the historic elements of the house, bidders have been granted permission to purchase structures and interiors from the house.
