= Joshua Lawrence =

Joshua Lawrence (1778–1843), of Tarboro, North Carolina, was an influential Baptist minister in the eastern United States during the Baptist missions controversy in the early 19th century.

Joshua Lawrence was born September 10, 1778. Lawrence (or Lawrence's) in Edgecombe County, North Carolina was named for his family. He began preaching when he was about 23 years old. He quickly became an active and influential minister in the Kehukee Baptist Association. The Kehukee Association was organized in Halifax County, North Carolina in 1765 and is generally considered the fourth oldest Baptist association in the United States^{1}. Lawrence was often called upon to represent them at other associational meetings, and was regularly chosen to preach before the body and to serve on its committees (both before and after the separation of 1827). He was a man of limited education, but possessed natural talents of oratory and logic.

Cover of Lawrence's anti-mission book The American Telescope, by a Clodhopper, of North Carolina published in 1825.

In 1814, the Baptist Board of Foreign Missions was formed, which set about a controversy that would divide the Baptists in the United States. On one side were those who promoted the use of foreign and home mission societies, theological seminaries, and various church auxiliaries, and on the other side were those who rejected them as not conforming to the Scriptures. Joshua Lawrence took the position that such auxiliaries and societies were without scriptural command or example, and became one of the leading voices on the east coast against them. Hassell credits Lawrence with saving the Kehukee Association from becoming part of the missionary movement. Through his influence, the growing missionary tide, led by Elder Martin Ross, was abated and in 1827 the Kehukee Association "agreed that we discard all Missionary Societies, Bible Societies and Theological Seminaries,...believing these societies and institutions to be inventions of men, and not warranted from the word of God."

In the two years following, the Kehukee Association reaffirmed this stance against opposition, and afterward became one of the leading "anti-missionary" associations. It is today considered the oldest Primitive Baptist association in existence. In Lawrence's day, the terminology Primitive Baptist was not in common usage, and the preferred term was usually Old School Baptist, which still retains a strong usage among Primitive Baptists on the East Coast.

Tarboro Church (now Primitive Baptist) was organized on February 7, 1819, by elders Joshua Lawrence, Martin Ross, Thomas Billings, and Thomas Meredith.

Some writings of Lawrence include Reminiscences, written in 1812, Declaration of Church Principles (1826), A Patriotic Discourse, preached on July 4, 1830, and later published, and Teeth to Teeth: Tom Thumb Tugging with the Wolves for the Sheepskin, written in 1837. Though not well known or widely read outside the Primitive Baptist movement, a few of Lawrence's writings are made available by the Primitive Baptist Library in Carthage, Illinois.

Joshua Lawrence married Mary Knight. He died in January 1843.

Sylvester Hassell summarized Lawrence's life in this way: "For more than forty years he advocated powerfully and fearlessly, both from pulpit and press, liberty of conscience, the specialty, spirituality and efficacy of God's salvation, and the unscripturalness and corruption of all the money based religious institutions of the nineteenth century, notwithstanding storms of slander and vituperation, and threats against his life, and during the latter part of his life, great physical debility and suffering." (Chapter 23, History of the Church of God)

== Footnote ==
1. Philadelphia (1707), Charleston (1751), Sandy Creek (1758), and Kehukee (1765), but the 5th oldest if the General Six-Principle Baptist Rhode Island Yearly Meeting (org. 1670) is counted.
