= The Wilson Times =

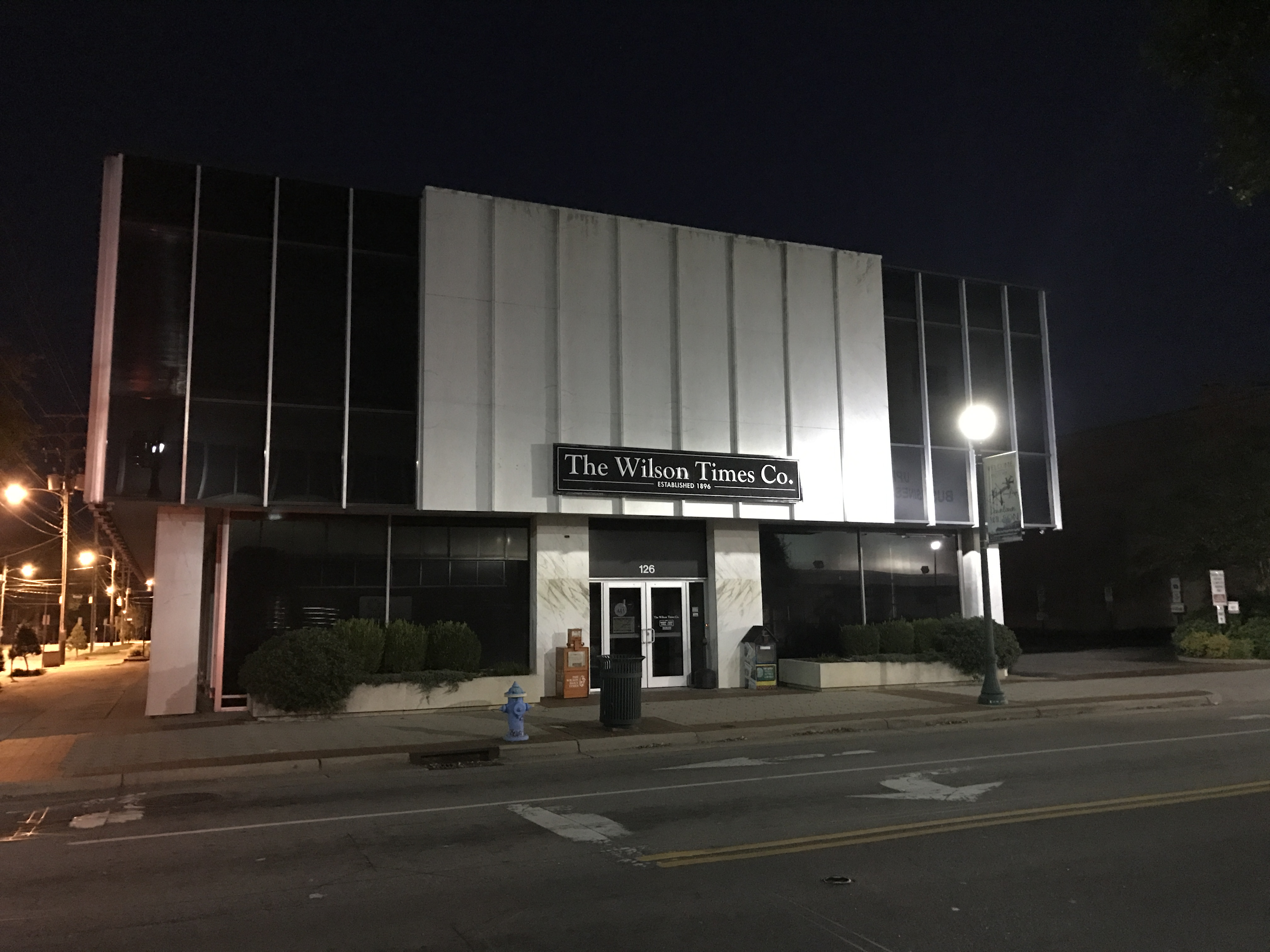
- The Wilson Times Co. building in downtown Wilson, North Carolina
- Type: Semiweekly newspaper
- Format: Broadsheet
- Owner: Restoration Newsmedia
- Founder: John D. Gold
- Publisher: Morgan Dickerman
- Editor: Corey Friedman
- Associate editor: Lisa Boykin Batts
- Staff writers: Olivia Neeley, Brie Handgraaf, Drew C. Wilson
- Founded: February 18, 1896 (as The Wilson Times)
- Language: American English
- Headquarters: 126 Nash St. W. Wilson, North Carolina 27893
- Circulation: 10,762
- OCLC number: 13291843
- Website: wilsontimes.com

The Wilson Times is an American, English language semiweekly newspaper based in Wilson, North Carolina covering Wilson County. The newspaper is owned by Wilson Times Co.

The paper began as Zion's Landmark, established in 1867 by the pastor of the Wilson Primitive Baptist Church, Elder P.D. Gold. In February 1896 that pastor founded The Wilson Times, a weekly newspaper. In 1902 the paper began daily publication as The Wilson Daily Times. The newspaper previously offered commercial job print services, book and catalog printing, as well as ruling and bonding services. It also prints the Wilson County Phone Directory, Money Mailer, and Xpress Marketing publications.

While initially occupying only a small brick corner store, the Wilson Times upgraded and moved to a custom-built, 30,000-square-foot office building in 1983. The Wilson Times joined the internet in 1997 under the domain wilsondaily.com. The newspaper relocated to its current downtown Wilson office in June 2017. In February 2021, the Times celebrated its 125th anniversary of continuous publication.

== History ==
John D. Gold, son of Pleasant Daniel Gold, founded The Wilson Times in 1896 as a weekly newspaper. He married Daisy Hendley, who worked as a managing editor at the paper. Gold remained with the newspaper until 1946, when H.D. Brauff leased the newspaper with an option to buy. Elizabeth Gold Swindell, daughter of John D. Gold, acted as the business manager for the newspaper under Brauff, and was offered a one-fifth interest to remain in the position, which she accepted. Elizabeth Gold Swindell announced that she had purchased the paper from the Brauff family in 1956, making her the sole owner. She served as the editor and publisher until she died in 1983. Her son-in-law, Morgan Paul Dickerman II, joined the paper as associate publisher in 1957, and assisted in major expansion of the newspaper. Dickerman served as associate publisher and general manager of the paper until his passing in 1974. Upon his death, Margaret Dickerman, daughter of Elizabeth Gold Swindell, began overseeing the operations of the paper. Morgan Paul Dickerman III joined the paper as vice president in 1979, and was named president and publisher upon the death of Mrs. Swindell.

The Wilson Times remains as "one of the few surviving family-owned newspapers in North Carolina," alongside The Daily Record, owned by Bart and Brent Adams, and Maere Kay Lashmit. In 2019, the two newspapers formed a partnership to create a media management company known as Restoration Newsmedia. The Wilson Times also publishes four weekly newspapers such as the Johnstonian News, The Wake Weekly, The Enterprise, and The Butner-Creedmoor News.

== Awards ==
The Wilson Times is a perennial winner in the North Carolina Press Association North Carolina Press Association member directory 's News, Editorial and Photojournalism Contest. Staff members receive individual awards in the annual competition, and the newspaper earned first-place honors in its circulation division for general excellence in 2019 and 2018. In the most recent contest, held in 2020, the Times finished third in general excellence.

In 2016, the paper won first place in Editorial Excellence from the Inland Press Association for newspapers under 10,000 circulation for "...five well-written editorials by Corey Friedman, all using sound arguments with pertinent details and connecting with the community on a myriad of local, state and national topics...." Friedman won again in 2017 for editorial writing; about his columns, the judges wrote "The Wilson Times stood out here for unearthing conflicts seldom (perhaps never?) covered elsewhere — while also leading the community towards solutions. "

In 2019, the Times won a Burl Osborne Award for Editorial Leadership from the News Leaders Association for a series of editorials by Friedman that advocated for reforms to the Wilson County Board of Education's public comment policy. "This newspaper tackled an important topic — the public's right to offer their views to elected officials — and it didn't let go," the judges wrote. "It offered readers information to get involved and it effected change. A fine example of a news organization looking out for its readers." The following year, Friedman was named a finalist for the same award.

The Wilson Times won first place in the 2022 National Headliner Awards for editorial writing by an individual or team.

== See also ==
- List of newspapers in North Carolina
