= Kehukee Primitive Baptist Church =

Historic church in North Carolina, United States

- U.S. National Register of Historic Places
- Location within North Carolina Location within the United States
- Location: NC 1810 northeast side, just east of the junction with NC 125, near Scotland Neck, North Carolina
- Coordinates: 36°6′21″N 77°24′54″W
- Area: 2 acres (0.81 ha)
- Built: 1872, 1901
- Architectural style: Gothic Revival, Front-gable church style
- NRHP reference No.: 94000023
- Added to NRHP: February 4, 1994

Kehukee Primitive Baptist Church is a historic Primitive Baptist church building in Halifax County, North Carolina located about a mile (1.5 km) south of Scotland Neck off NC Route 125. It was built in 1872 and is a simple gable-front frame structure subsequently sheathed in weatherboard. A Gothic Revival style frame tower was added in 1901. Also on the property is a church cemetery established in 1889.

The Kehukee congregation's previous meeting house, at a different site, was the location in 1769 for the foundation of the Kehukee Baptist Association of churches from North Carolina and southern Virginia, and in 1827 of the Primitive Baptist Kehukee Declaration issued by the association. The 1872 site, including the cemetery, was added to the National Register of Historic Places in 1994.

== Kehukee congregation ==
The original Kehukee (formerly also Quehuky) meeting house was built about 1742 by William Surginer or Sojourner (1706–1750), a General Baptist from Burley, Isle of Wight County, Virginia who acquired land in the basin of the Kehukee Swamp, a creek which flows into the Roanoke River, and settled there in the mid-1720s. The church stood near the creek and two miles east of Scotland Neck, on land donated by Surginer, its first minister. About 1755 the congregation adopted practices based on those of the Philadelphia Baptist Association after a visit by two of the latter's elders, Benjamin Miller and William Van Horne (father of Thomas Van Horne). As the earliest Baptist church in the region, Kehukee was direct or indirect mother church of many others. It was the founding site of the Kehukee Association in 1769, but not the leading church within that association.

As a subsidiary branch of the Kehukee congregation, a "new meeting house" was established on Fishing Creek (not to be confused with Lower Fishing Creek church, founded by Charles Daniel). It was sometimes called "Cotten's meeting house", and later "Lawrence's meeting house" after elder Joshua Lawrence. By 1803 "deaths, excommunications, and removals" had reduced the membership of the "old meeting house" at Kehukee to much less than that at Fishing Creek, In 1806 the association recognised Lawrence's Meeting House as a separate member church.

The Kehukee church had no minister from 1830 to 1860, when elder John W. Stamper took over. In 1871–72 the current church was built a mile south of Scotland Neck. The old church was torn down soon after, Local historian Charlie Dunn Alston believes the old site was donated for a church for freedmen, and now holds the Kehukee Baptist Church, a Black church on Sherman Drive off NC Route 903 (36.118889°N 77.3735376°W).

The addition of the steeple to Kehukee Primitive Baptist Church in 1901 is ascribed to John Coughenour, a sawmill owner who lived within sight of the church and preferred the steepled designs of his native Pennsylvania. Church membership declined from 62 in 1905 to 40 in 1919, and steadily thereafter. The last member, Lena Andrews Shackell, died in 1979 aged 102, and the last regular church meeting was held in 1981. The property reverted to the Kehukee Association, which as of 1993 still occasionally used the building for meetings. Later it was sold to a local resident who had already been volunteering in its upkeep.

Ministers of Kehukee Church
William Surginer	c. 1742–1750
Thomas Pope	1751–1763
John Meglamre	c. 1766–1772
William Burges	1772–
Silas Mercer (father of Jesse Mercer)	c. 1776–1781
Joshua White	–c. 1790
Lemuel Burkitt	–1807
Joshua Lawrence	1807–1830
none	1830–1860
John W. Stamper	1860–1876
Pleasant Daniel Gold	1876–1879
Andrew J. Moore	1879–1919

== Kehukee Association ==
The Kehukee Association was formed at the Kehukee church, probably in 1769, by several Baptist churches (most named after nearby watercourses) in Halifax, Edgecombe, Warren, Bertie, and Camden counties. Dozens more churches from surrounding areas joined in subsequent decades. Some of these later endorsed Free Will Baptism and left the association. Provincial North Carolina's Regulator Insurrection (1768–1771) devastated the western base of Shubal Stearns' Sandy Creek Association, whose few churches in the province's east asked to join Kehukee instead. Some of the old Kehukee Regulars accepted affiliation of Separatists without requiring re-baptism, precipitating a split in 1775 between these "United Baptists" and the hardline Regulars. The split ended in 1786, when the reunited group was named the United Baptist Association. In 1777, ten churches of the Regular Baptist faction made a confession of faith which was implicitly endorsed after the reunification.

Sometimes the Virginia and North Carolina member churches respectively met separately from the full conference of all churches, and in 1790 the two states permanently split amicably, the Carolina group regaining the name Kehukee Association while the Virginia one took the name Virginia Portsmouth Association. In 1793, the Neuse Baptist Association, comprising the churches south of the Tar River, was split off for similar reasons of convenience. In 1803, there were 31 member churches in the Kehukee Association, most being members of one of its four regional "Union Meetings", namely east of Chowan River, Bertie, Flat Swamp, and Swift Creek, the last including Kehukee church itself. In 1806 there was a third split, the churches on the right bank of the Roanoke seceding as the Chowan Association.

In the early 19th century, Joshua Lawrence of the Kehukee Association was a leader of the Primitive Baptist movement, which opposed the General Baptist involvement in mission boards, tract societies, and temperance societies. In August 1826 Lawrence prepared a "Declaration of the Reformed Baptist Churches in North Carolina", which was published in succeeding months and debated by Kehukee and its sibling associations. Kehukee's 1826 conference voted to send it to the member churches for consideration, and its 1827 conference issued what became known as the Kehukee Declaration:

A paper purporting to be a Declaration of the Reformed Baptists in North Carolina, dated August 26, 1826, which was presented at last Association, and referred to the churches to express in their letters to this Association their views with regard to it, came up for deliberation. Upon examination, it was found that most of the churches had given their opinions; and after an interchange of sentiments among the members of this body, it was agreed that we discard all Missionary Societies, Bible Societies and Theological Seminaries, and the practices heretofore resorted to for their support, in begging money from the public; and if any persons should be among us, as agents of any of said societies, we hereafter discountenance them in those practices; and if under a character of a minister of the gospel, we will not invite them into our pulpits; believing these societies and institutions to be the inventions of men, and not warranted from the word of God. We further do unanimously agree that should any of the members of our churches join the fraternity of Masons, or, being members, continue to visit the lodges and parades, we will not invite them to preach in our pulpits, believing them to be guilty of such practices; and we declare non-fellowship with them and such practices altogether.

Despite scattered earlier smaller-scale incidents, the Kehukee Declaration is considered by many historians to mark the birth of Primitive Baptism. Alexander Campbell endorsed the declaration despite later evincing support for missions.

At its 1861 conference the Kehukee Association ordered a day of fasting and prayer to mark the Civil War. A similar resolution in 1862 was not carried out due to the disruption of Union Army occupation. The association's 1886 history claimed that Primitive Baptists were the only Protestant denomination with no ill will between its Southern and Northern members — the former having joined the Confederate Army while the latter stayed out of the Union Army. The association grew from 37 congregations in 1860 with 1,494 members, to a peak of 41 with 2,067 in 1879. It fell to 38 with 1,258 in 1919 and 26 with 1,135 in 1926. Membership declined steadily over the 20th century.

== Sources ==
- Biggs, Joseph; Burkitt, Lemuel; Read, Jesse (1834). A concise history of the Kehukee Baptist Association, from its original rise to the present time. Tarboro: G. Howard.
- Burkitt, Lemuel; Read, Jesse; Burkitt, Henry Lemuel (1850). A concise history of the Kehukee Baptist association. Philadelphia: Lippincott, Grambo.
- Edwards, Morgan; Paschal, G. W. (1984). "Materials towards a History of the Baptists in the Province of North Carolina". In Weeks, Eve B.; Warren, Mary B. (eds.). Materials towards a History of the Baptists. Vol. 2. Danielsville, Ga.: Heritage Papers. pp. 79–118 – via Internet Archive.
- Garrett, James Leo, Jr. (2009). Baptist Theology: A Four-Century Study. Mercer University Press. ISBN 978-0-88146-129-9.
- Hassell, Cushing Biggs; Hassell, Sylvester (1886). "XXIII: Kehukee Association from 1834 to 1885". History of the Church of God: From the Creation to A. D. 1885; Including Especially the History of the Kehukee Primitive Baptist Association. Middletown, Orange County, New York: Gilbert Beebe. pp. 777–828.
- Sparks, John (2005) [2001]. The Roots of Appalachian Christianity: The Life and Legacy of Elder Shubal Stearns. Appalachian Studies. Vol. 15. University Press of Kentucky. ISBN 0-8131-2223-6.
- Stalls, Sarah Hodges (May 2021). "The Mother Church; Kehukee Primitive Baptist Church". Eastern North Carolina Living. 13 (3). Windsor, N.C.: APG Media Eastern NC: 16–18 – via Issuu.
- York, Drucilla H. (September 1993). "Kehukee Primitive Baptist Church" (PDF). National Register of Historic Places — Nomination and Inventory. North Carolina State Historic Preservation Office.
