= Furr Farm =

Historic house in Virginia, United States

- U.S. National Register of Historic Places
- Virginia Landmarks Register
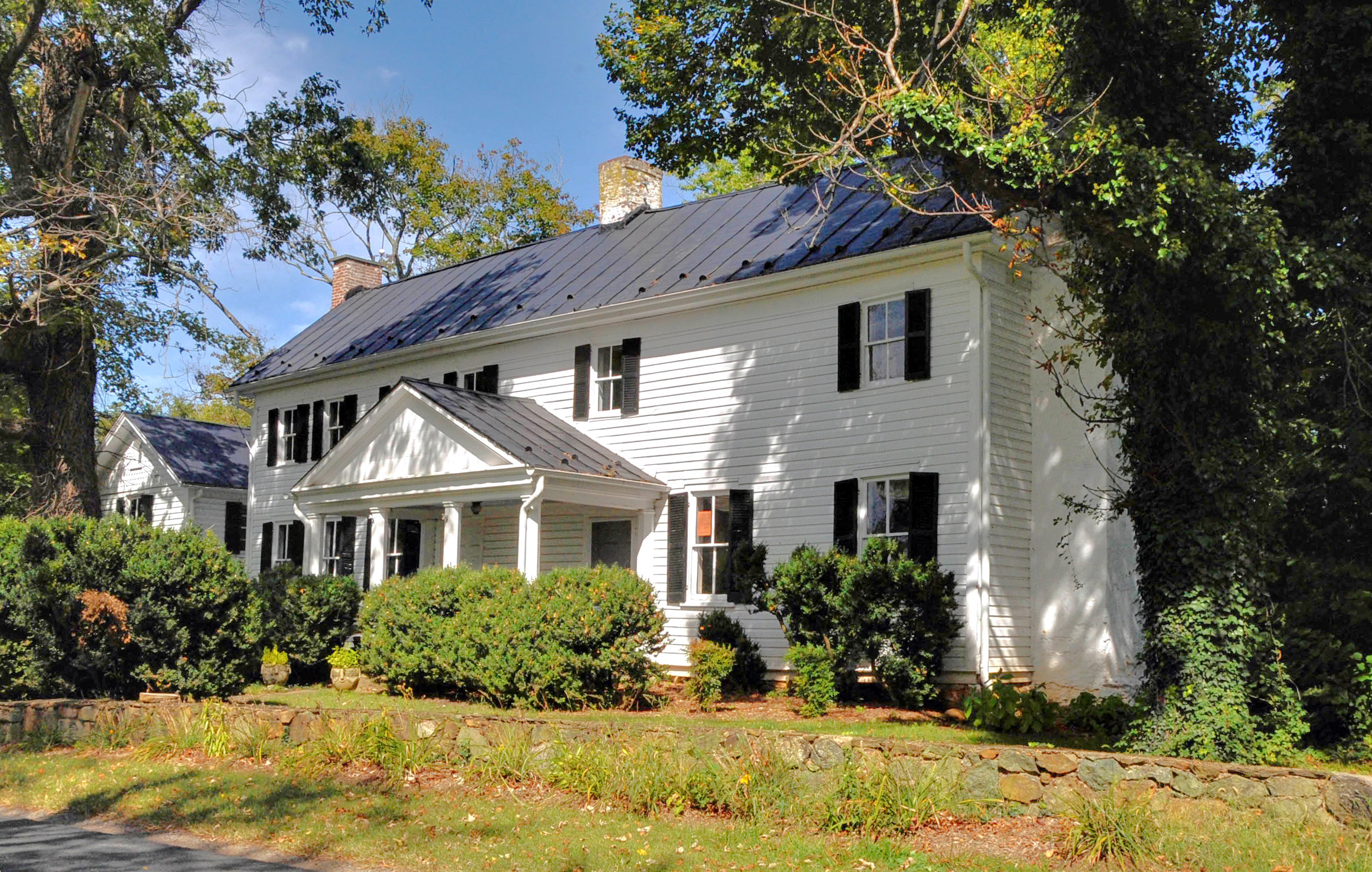

- Location within Northern Virginia Location within Virginia Location within the United States
- Location: 40590 Snickersville Turnpike, Aldie, Virginia
- Coordinates: 38°59′41″N 77°39′54″W
- NRHP reference No.: 12000541
- VLR No.: 053-5056-0001

Significant dates
- Added to NRHP: August 17, 2012
- Designated VLR: June 21, 2012

Furr Farm is a historic home and farm located at Aldie, Loudoun County, Virginia. The house is a two-story, five-bay, frame structure with a side gable roof and exterior end chimneys. The property includes two contributing frame barns.

It was listed on the National Register of Historic Places in 2012.
