= Beards Creek Primitive Baptist Church =

Baptist church in Glennville, Georgia, United States

Coordinates: 31.982057°N 81.867747°W

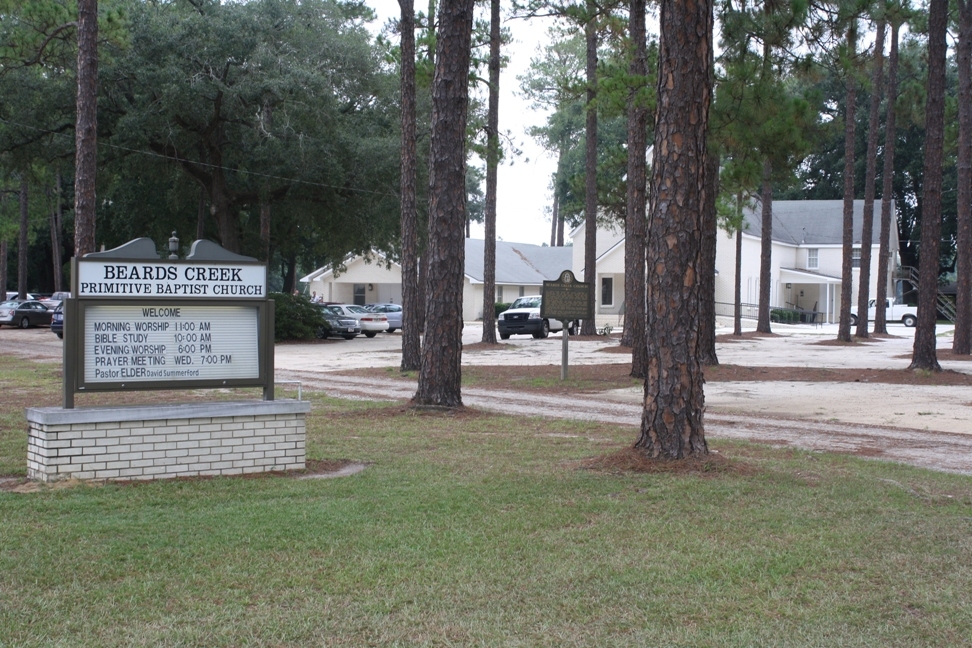
Beards Creek Primitive Baptist Church

Beards Creek Primitive Baptist Church is located at 60 Beards Creek Church Road, (County Road 359), Glennville, Georgia in Tattnall County. The church was originally constituted on December 29, 1804 under the name of Beards Creek Church. The Georgia Historical Commission recognized Beards Creek Church as a historical site in 1957. The historical marker states "Beards Creek Church was orderly constituted on December 29, 1804, by the Rev. John Gooldwire, the Rev. John Standford, the Rev. Isham Peacock, and the Rev. David Hennesy, all orderly Baptist ministers."

Later, the church added "Primitive Baptist" to its name. The church has been responsible for other churches developed in surrounding area that originated from Beards Creek Church. Beards Creek Primitive Baptist Church manages a cemetery on the property. The cemetery contains the remains of several Confederate soldiers.
