= Republican Primitive Baptist Church =

Historic church in Tennessee, United States

- U.S. National Register of Historic Places
- Location within Tennessee Location within the United States
- Nearest city: Brownsville, Tennessee
- Coordinates: 35°38′1″N 89°25′55″W
- Area: 1 acre (0.40 ha)
- MPS: Rural African-American Churches in Tennessee MPS
- NRHP reference No.: 00000769
- Added to NRHP: July 05, 2000

Republican Primitive Baptist Church is a historic African-American church of the Primitive Baptist tradition located in rural Haywood County, Tennessee, about 10 miles west of Brownsville.

The congregation was organized in the years after the Civil War. The name "Republican" refers to the Republican Party, reflecting the predominant political allegiance of African Americans in that era.

The congregation's original church building burned in 1924 and was replaced in the following year by the present building. The church building is a one-story rectangular frame structure of vernacular design, painted white, with plain glass windows and no steeple. Its north facade is dominated by two main entrance doors. The two doors were originally separate entrances for men and women, who sat separately during worship; this type of segregation by gender was typical for Primitive Baptist churches in the late 19th and early 20th centuries. The building has electric service but lacks indoor plumbing.

The Republican Primitive Baptist Church served as a black school for the rural community of Shady Rest until a schoolhouse was completed in the late 1920s. In later years, the church continued to offer informal education at weekly meetings for local youth, teaching girls about nutrition, quilting, sewing, and other household skills, while boys received instruction in farming.

After its membership declined during the 1970s and 1980s, in 1989 the Republican congregation merged with a Primitive Baptist church in another community. The building is now used for annual homecomings.

The church was added to the National Register of Historic Places in 2000.
