= Institute Farm =

- Loudoun Agricultural and Mechanical Institute
- U.S. National Register of Historic Places
- Virginia Landmarks Register
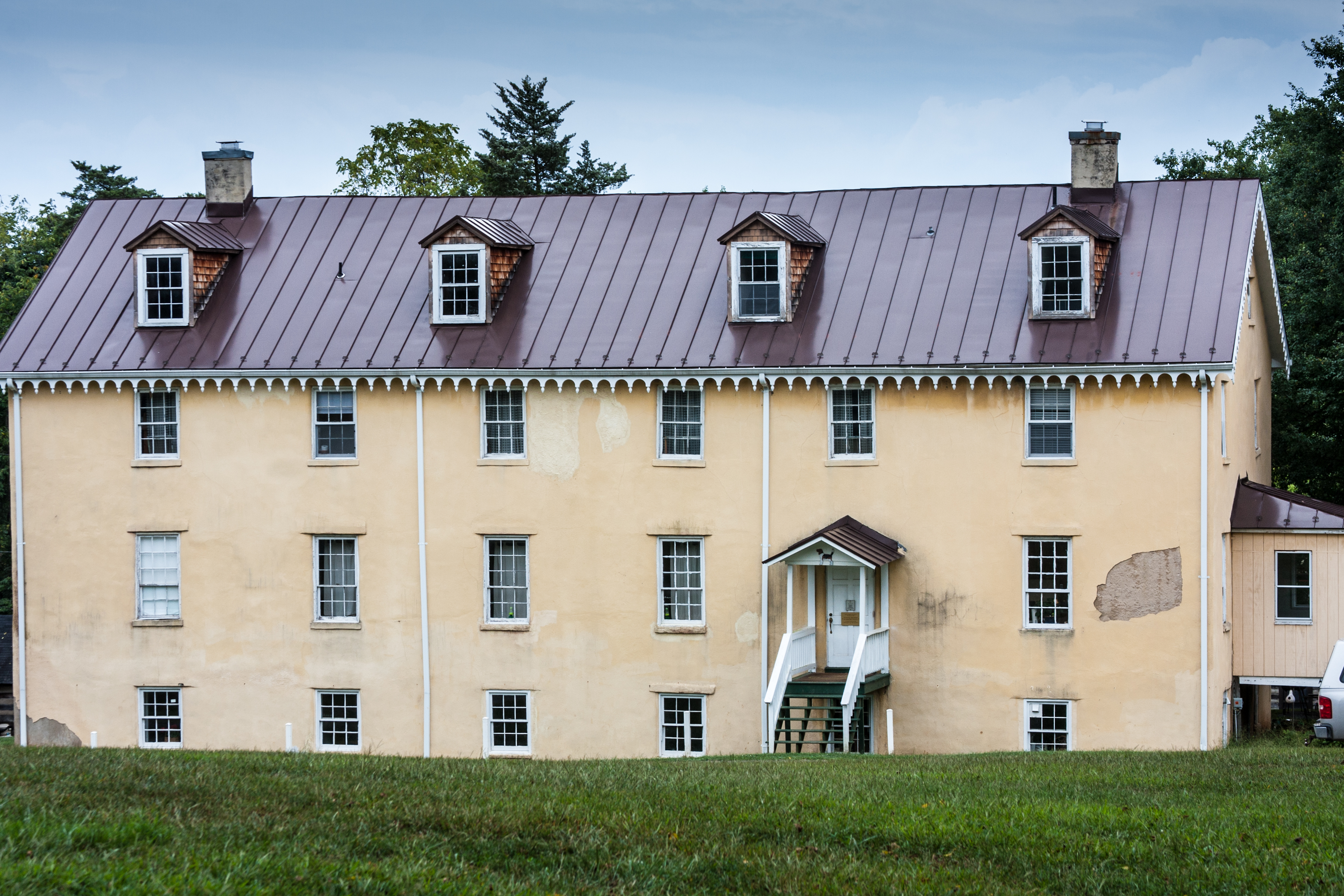

- Location within Northern Virginia Location within Virginia Location within the United States
- Nearest city: Aldie, Virginia
- Coordinates: 39°00′28.04″N 77°39′36.24″W
- Area: 16 acres (6.5 ha)
- Built: 1854
- NRHP reference No.: 82004568
- VLR No.: 053-0139

Significant dates
- Added to NRHP: July 8, 1982
- Designated VLR: March 17, 1981

Institute Farm, also known as the Loudoun Agricultural and Mechanical Institute, was the first agricultural school in Virginia and one of the earliest institutions devoted to agronomy in the United States. Located near Aldie, Virginia, the school was established as the Loudoun County Agricultural Institute and Chemical Academy around 1854 on a former portion of U.S. President James Monroe's Oak Hill plantation.

== History ==
The institute was established by Benjamin Hyde Benton, Harmon Bitzer and James Gulick, who were active in the Agricultural Society of Loudoun, on land belonging to Gulick's family. The school lasted for only six years, suffering from the Panic of 1857 and failing in 1860. Gulick put the property up for sale, but with the outbreak of the American Civil War in 1861, was unable to sell. Gulickjoined the Confederate Army and was killed in 1864 at the Battle of Upperville. The property was by his estate to a neighbor, Isabella Turner. Turner's estate sold the property to the Institute Corporation in 1916, whereupon the property became the headquarters for the National Beagle Club of America, which retains the property.

== Architecture ==
The main house is a 3 1/2-story stuccoed stone building. The large plain building is six bays wide with a partly sunken basement. The main entrance is through a small porch offset to the right to the first floor, replacing the original entrance, which was on the opposite side facing a tiered garden. The interior remains largely as it was when the property was a school, with a central hallway on each level running the length of the building. The second floor and attic levels are partitioned into smaller rooms originally used as dormitories. The property also features 13 log cabins built between 1917 and 1971, used by the club during beagle shows and trials for lodging.

The property was placed on the National Register of Historic Places on July 8, 1982.
