= Butner-Creedmoor News =

Newspaper published in Creedmoor, NC, US

- Type: Weekly newspaper
- Owner: Restoration Newsmedia
- Publisher: Keven Zepezauer
- Editor: Logan Martinez
- Founded: 1965
- Language: English
- Headquarters: 109 South Elm St. Creedmoor, NC 27522
- Circulation: 5,400 (as of 2018)
- OCLC number: 30715527
- Website: butnercreedmoornews.com

The Butner-Creedmoor News is a weekly newspaper with coverage area including the towns of Butner, Creedmoor and Stem, as well as Southern Granville, Northern Wake and Northern Durham counties in North Carolina. The newspaper is printed on Fridays and is online as well; it covers local news, area sports, and local obituaries. It started publishing in 1965.

== History ==
Harry Coleman served as editor from 1974, when he moved to Granville County, until his death in 2012. The current editor is Logan Martinez. His position was announced on March 12, 2019.

Morgan Dickerman, the current president of The Wilson Times, one of North Carolina's last two family-owned daily newspapers, publishes The Butner-Creedmoor News as one of its four weekly papers.

== See also ==
- List of newspapers published in North Carolina
