= The Wake Weekly =

- Type: Weekly newspaper
- Owner: Restoration Newsmedia
- Publisher: Keven Zepezauer
- Editor: Shawn Taylor
- Founded: 1947
- Language: English
- Headquarters: Wake Forest, North Carolina United States
- Circulation: 8,900
- Sister newspapers: The Wake Forest Weekly, The Rolesville Weekly and The Franklin Weekly
- Website: wakeweekly.com

The Wake Weekly is an American weekly newspaper based in Wake Forest, North Carolina, primarily covering the North Carolina counties of Wake and Franklin.

== History ==
From 2009–2019, it was published by Allen Publishing LLC, a corporation owned by Todd Allen, son of original owners Robert W. and Margaret G. Allen. Robert Allen acquired the newspaper in 1952 from his brother and owned and operated it for nearly 50 years with Margaret.

Margaret Allen was awarded the National Newspaper Association's Emma C. McKinney award for community journalism. The Allens were named to the North Carolina Journalism Hall of fame in 2006 the first couple to be jointly named. Because Margaret died on November 1, 2005, she was given the award posthumously.

Allen Publishing, LLC, acquired the paper from the family in 2009 and in early 2010, bought out the other members to become sole owner. The same year, The Wake Weekly name was replaced in its three primary coverage areas as The Franklin Weekly, The Rolesville-Wake Crossroads Weekly and The Wake Forest Weekly, under the auspices of The Wake Weekly Family of Community Newspapers.

The Wake Weekly has won multiple awards from the North Carolina Press Association. In 2009, 2011, 2013, and 2016, The Wake Weekly, and The Wake Forest Weekly were awarded First Place in General Excellence. and first place for sports reporting in 2015, and sports photography in 2018 under award-winning sports editor Marty Simpkins, among other awards.

In January 2019, Allen Publishing, LLC sold the paper to the Wilson Times Company.

The paper won first place in the Investigative Reporting category from the Inland Press Association for their 2019 article "Town now says public emails to cost at least $15K."
