= Daisy Hendley Gold =

American writer and journalist

- Born: Daisy Mabel Hendley; October 26, 1893; Iredell County, North Carolina, U.S.
- Died: April 7, 1975 (aged 81); Lillington, North Carolina, U.S.
- Resting place: Maplewood Cemetery
- Education: North Carolina State Normal and Industrial College
- Occupations: Writer, journalist
- Spouse: John Daniel Gold (1924–1954; his death)
- Children: 2 (including Celeste Gold Broughton)
- Parent(s): Alvis Francis Hendley; Celeste Rimmer Norris

Daisy Mabel Hendley Gold (October 26, 1893 – April 7, 1975) was an American writer, poet, and journalist. She worked for the Statesville Record & Landmark and The Greenville Piedmont before becoming the managing editor of the Wilson Times in 1920. She later married John Daniel Gold, the editor and publisher of the Wilson Times. Gold authored a book of poetry, Tides of Life, in 1927 and a novel, It Was Forever, in 1940. She also wrote a history book titled A Town Named Wilson that was never published.

== Early life and education ==
Gold was born on October 26, 1893, in Iredell County, North Carolina. She was the daughter of Alvis Francis Hendley and his second wife, Celeste Rimmer Norris. She was of Scotch-Irish, French, and English descent. Gold attended local schools before studying at the North Carolina State Normal and Industrial College in Greensboro. She was enrolled at the Normal and Industrial College for three years, but did not graduate.

== Career ==
Gold began her journalism career working at the Statesville Record & Landmark and later worked for the Greenville Piedmont. She was invited to work as a foreign correspondent in Europe during World War I, but her parents dissuaded her from taking the post. In 1920 she became the managing editor of the Wilson Times. Gold worked at Wilson Times until 1947, writing feature stories about coastal and eastern North Carolina.

Gold authored a book of lyric poems called Tides of Life in 1927. In 1940 she published the book It Was Forever, a novel about a young married woman from coastal North Carolina who falls in love with a British sea captain. Prior to her death she was writing a history book on Wilson County titled A Town Named Wilson. The original typewritten manuscript of the unpublished history book is owned by the Wilson County Public Library. A Town Named Wilson has no mention of African-American citizens of the town except for a reference to slavery.

== Personal life ==
She married John Daniel Gold, editor and publisher of the Wilson Times and son of Pleasant Daniel Gold, on February 7, 1924. She was Gold's second wife, and became the stepmother of his three daughters. She and Gold had two children together, Celeste Gold and John Daniel Gold, Jr. Her husband was one of the wealthiest men in Wilson, and they lived in a Georgian Revival mansion on West Nash Street in Wilson. Her daughter married Robert Bain Broughton, the son of North Carolina Governor J. Melville Broughton and Alice Willson Broughton, and lived in the Broughton House in Raleigh.

Gold and her husband also owned a summer home in Morehead City, which they built in 1935. She was a member of the Presbyterian Church and was a registered Democrat. After her husband's death in 1954, Gold sold their house and built a Neo-Classical two-story home on West Nash Street.

She died on April 7, 1975, at a nursing home in Lillington. A prayer service was held by her family at the Mitchell Funeral Home in Raleigh. She was buried in Maplewood Cemetery in Wilson.
