= Primitive Baptist Church (Nashville, Tennessee) =

Historic church in Tennessee, United States

- U.S. National Register of Historic Places
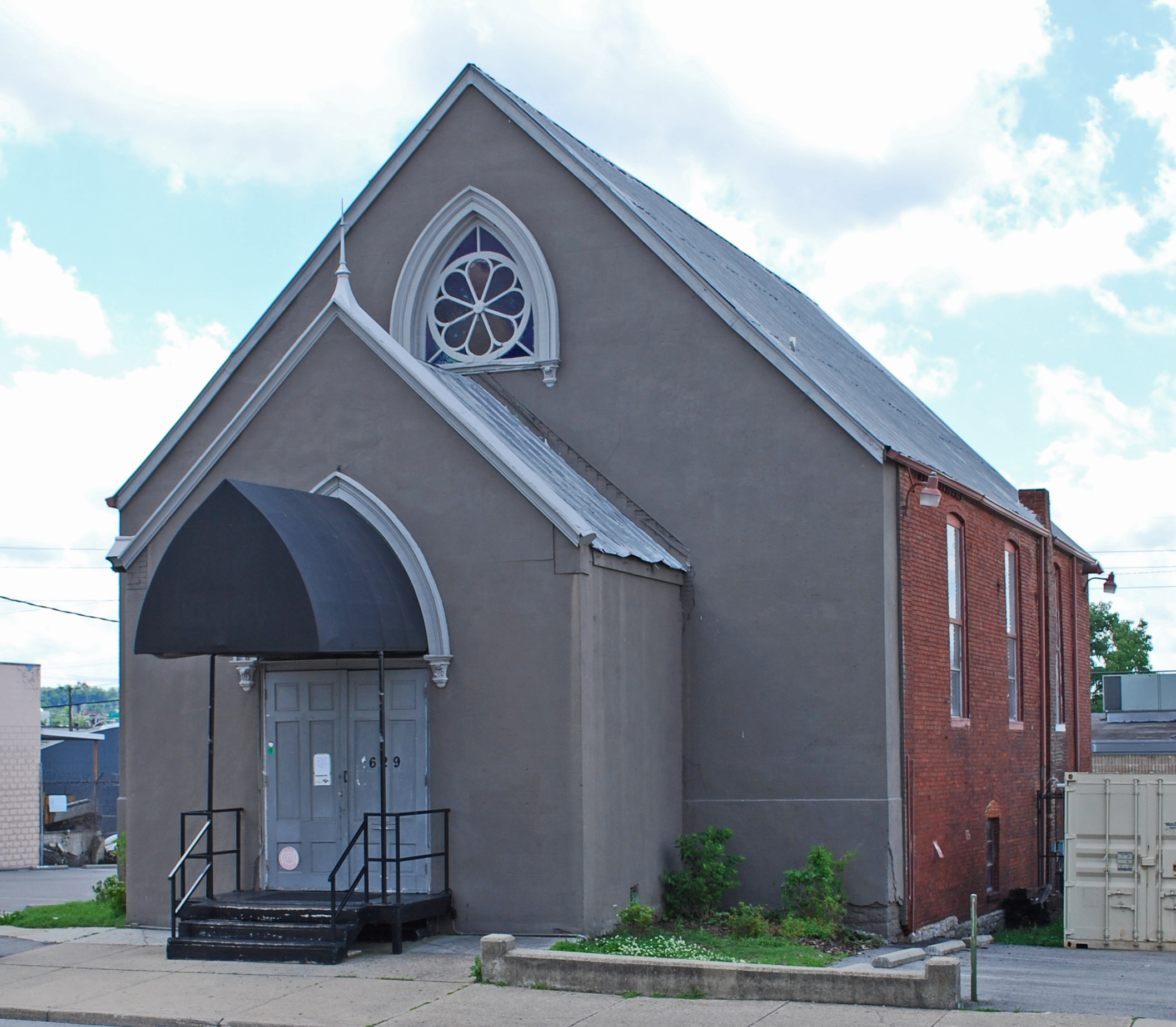

- Location within Tennessee Location within the United States
- Location: 627-629 3rd Ave., S., Nashville, Tennessee
- Coordinates: 36°9′15″N 86°46′19″W
- Area: 0.2 acres (0.081 ha)
- Built: 1850
- Architectural style: Gothic Revival
- MPS: Nineteenth Century Churches of South Nashville TR
- NRHP reference No.: 84003513
- Added to NRHP: May 15, 1984

Primitive Baptist Church (The College Street Primitive Baptist Church) is a historic Primitive Baptist church at 627-629 3rd Ave., S. in Nashville, Tennessee.

It was built in 1850 and added to the National Register in 1984.

The building is the current home of The Anchor Fellowship, an interdenominational Christian community. It also serves as a music and events venue.
