= Red Banks Primitive Baptist Church =

Historic church in North Carolina, United States

- U.S. National Register of Historic Places
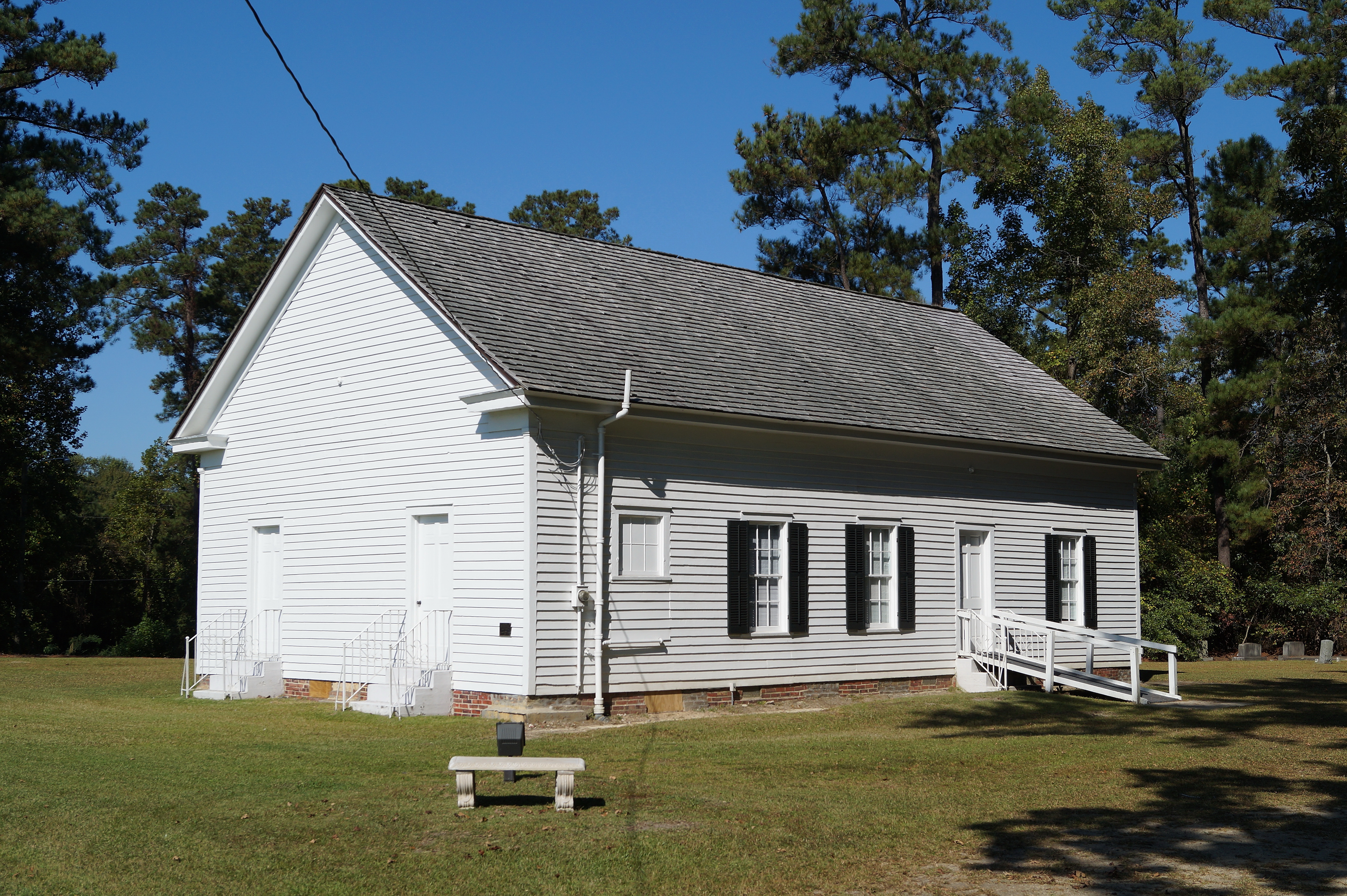

- Location within North Carolina Location within the United States
- Location: NC 1704, junction with NC 1725, Bell Fork, North Carolina
- Coordinates: 35°34′18″N 77°20′28″W
- Area: 1 acre (0.40 ha)
- Built: 1893
- Architectural style: Gable-front
- NRHP reference No.: 02000060
- Added to NRHP: February 20, 2002

Red Banks Primitive Baptist Church is a historic Primitive Baptist church located between Meeting House Branch and E. Firetower Road in Greenville, Pitt County, North Carolina. The original church building was set on fire on December 30, 1863, by Union forces under the command of Col. Joseph M. McChesney. It was rebuilt in 1893 and is a one-story, frame, gable front, rectangular, building measuring approximately 50 feet by 30 feet. It is two bays wide and five bays deep and sits on a brick pier foundation. Located on the property is the contributing church cemetery with less than 20 markers.

The Red Banks Primitive Baptist Church was deeded to the Pitt County Historical Society in May 2000.

It was added to the National Register of Historic Places in 2002.
