= Beesley Primitive Baptist Church =

Historic church in Tennessee, United States

- U.S. National Register of Historic Places
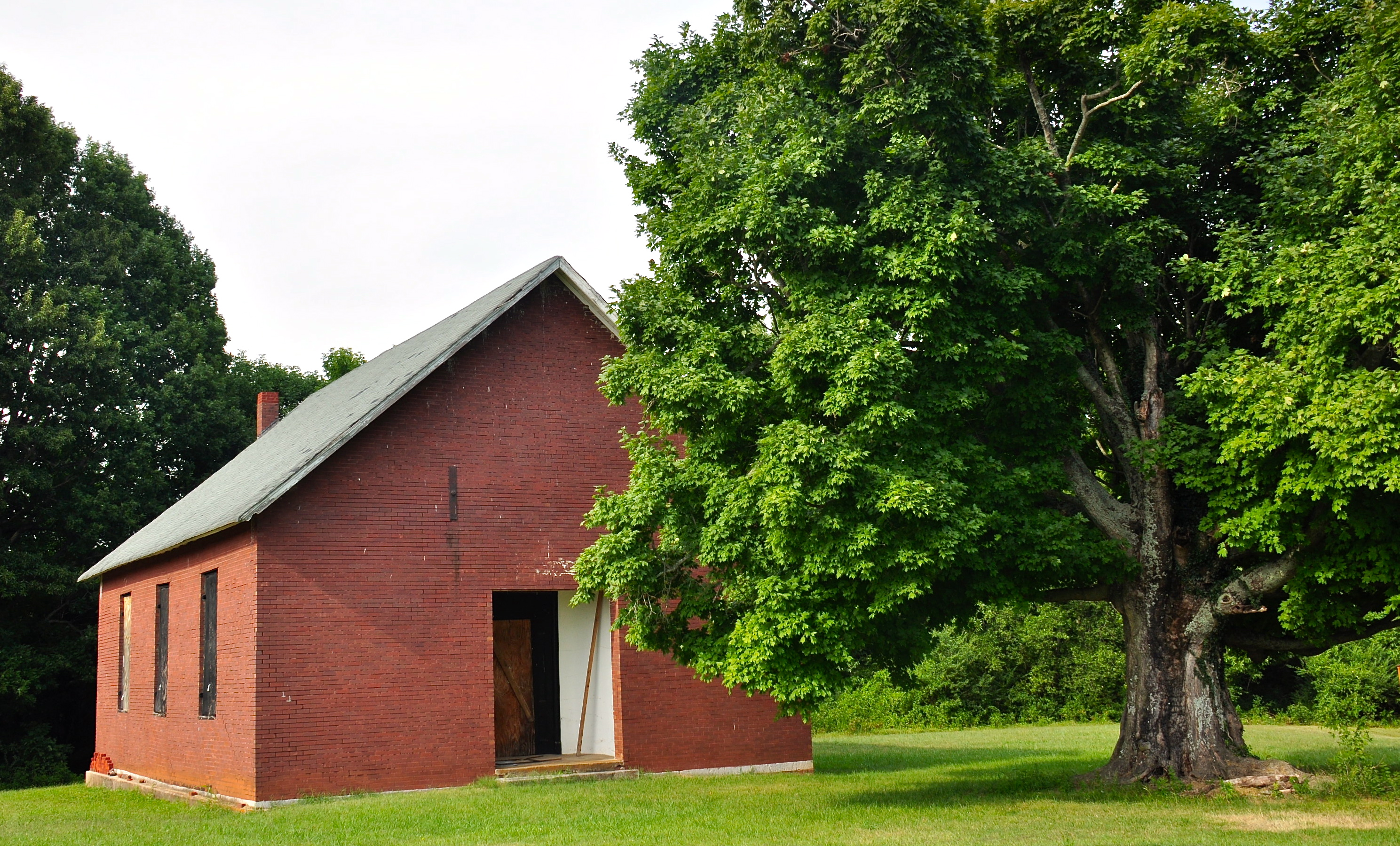
- Beesley Primitive Baptist Church, August 2014.

- Location within Tennessee Location within the United States
- Nearest city: Murfreesboro, Tennessee
- Coordinates: 35°51′11″N 86°29′51″W
- Area: 1.1 acres (0.45 ha)
- Built: 1913
- NRHP reference No.: 99000397
- Added to NRHP: April 08, 1999

Beesley Primitive Baptist Church is a historic Primitive Baptist church in Murfreesboro, Tennessee.

It was built in 1913 and added to the National Register in 1999.
