= Spring Green Primitive Baptist Church =

Historic church in North Carolina, United States

- U.S. National Register of Historic Places
- Location within North Carolina Location within the United States
- Location: Jct. of NC 1409 and NC 903, near Hamilton, North Carolina
- Coordinates: 35°53′40″N 77°11′41″W
- Area: 3.5 acres (1.4 ha)
- Built: 1878
- Architectural style: Greek Revival
- NRHP reference No.: 05000323
- Added to NRHP: April 20, 2005

Spring Green Primitive Baptist Church is a historic Primitive Baptist church located near Hamilton, Martin County, North Carolina. It was built in 1878, and is a front-gable, frame building with late Greek Revival style design elements. The building measures 36 feet, 4 inches, wide and 55 feet, 4 1/2 inches deep. Also on the property is the contributing church cemetery.

It was added to the National Register of Historic Places in 2005.
