= Mount Zion Old School Baptist Church =

Historic church in Virginia, United States

- U.S. National Register of Historic Places
- Virginia Landmarks Register
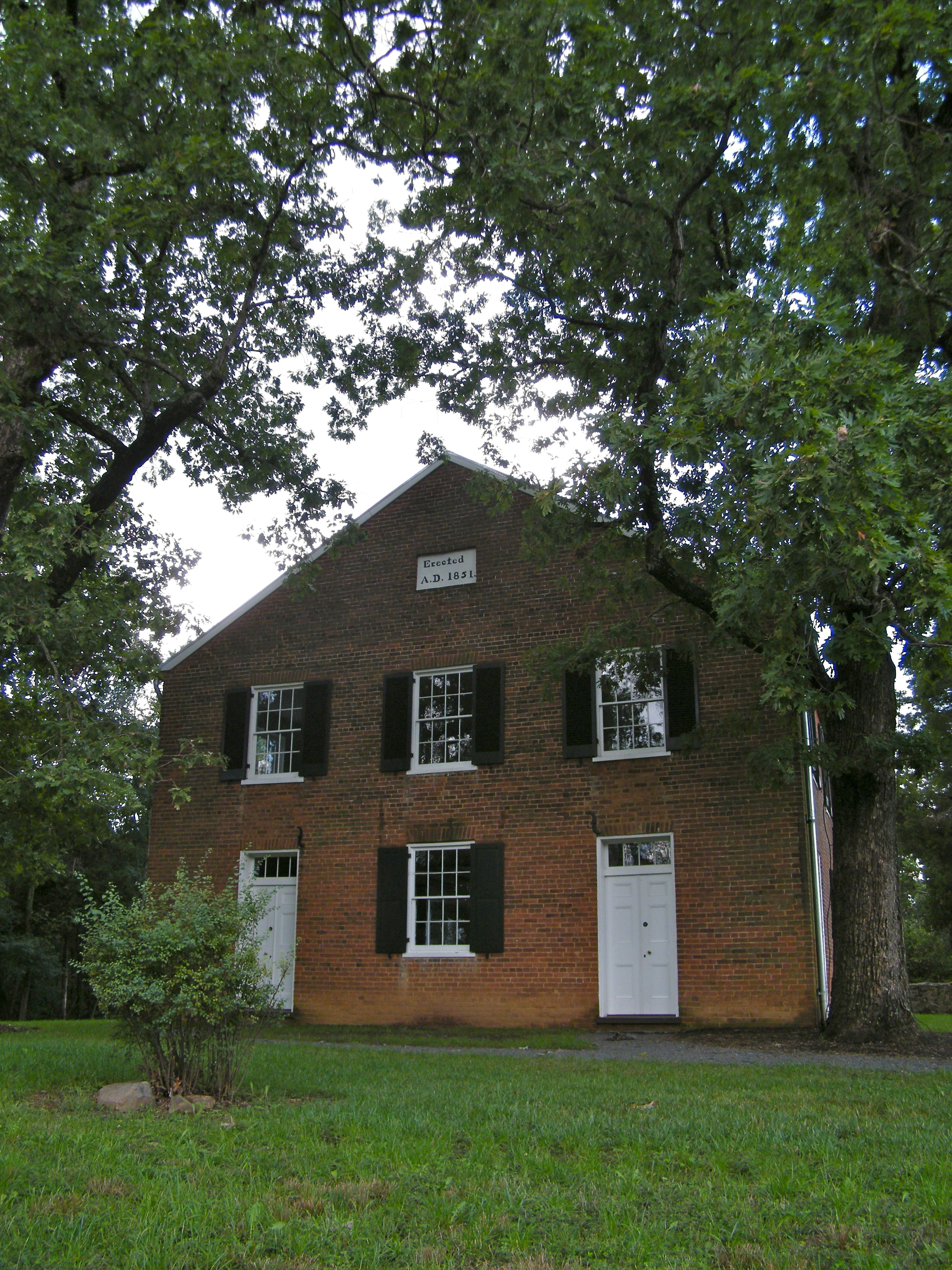
- Mount Zion Old School Baptist Church, September 2011

- Location within Northern Virginia Location within Virginia Location within the United States
- Location: 40309 John Mosby Hwy., Aldie, Virginia
- Coordinates: 38°57′48″N 77°36′39″W
- Area: 6.9 acres (2.8 ha)
- Built: 1851
- NRHP reference No.: 98000452
- VLR No.: 053-0339

Significant dates
- Added to NRHP: May 8, 1998
- Designated VLR: September 17, 1997

Mount Zion Old School Baptist Church, also known as Mount Zion Primitive Baptist Church and Mount Zion Old School Predestinarian Baptist Church, is a historic Primitive Baptist church located at Gilberts Corner, Loudoun County, Virginia. It is now maintained by the Northern Virginia Regional Park Authority: the property including the adjoining cemetery is open from dawn to dusk and the church itself open on the fourth Sunday of various months (except in wintertime), or by reservation for weddings and events.

== History ==
The current brick building was built in 1851 and used as a place of worship for Old School Baptists until the 1980s. During the American Civil War, it served as a gathering place for Mosby's Rangers, as well as a hospital and prison.

Both Union and Confederate soldiers are buried in the cemetery, as is a War of 1812 veteran, and several from more recent wars. More than 200 graves from the 19th and 20th centuries are marked with inscribed stones; the cemetery is still in use today. Sixty African Americans are also buried in the segregated section located outside of the enclosed white section. There are only two tombstones with the names intact, Lucinda DeNeal and Lou Green. On Lucina's headstone it reads that she was a "longtime member of the Old School Baptist Church." Immediately outside the cemetery gate is a monument to a battle correspondent who died in the church/hospital after falling from his horse while covering a cavalry engagement in nearby Aldie.

== Architecture ==
The current two-story, rectangular brick building was built in 1851, and has a gable roof. It measures 46 feet, 2 inches, by 36 feet, 2 inches, and sits on a stone foundation. Also located on the property is the contributing church cemetery with more than 200 graves from the 19th and 20th centuries marked with inscribed stones.

It was listed on the National Register of Historic Places in 1998.
