= West Nash Street Historic District =

Historic district in North Carolina, United States

- U.S. National Register of Historic Places
- U.S. Historic district
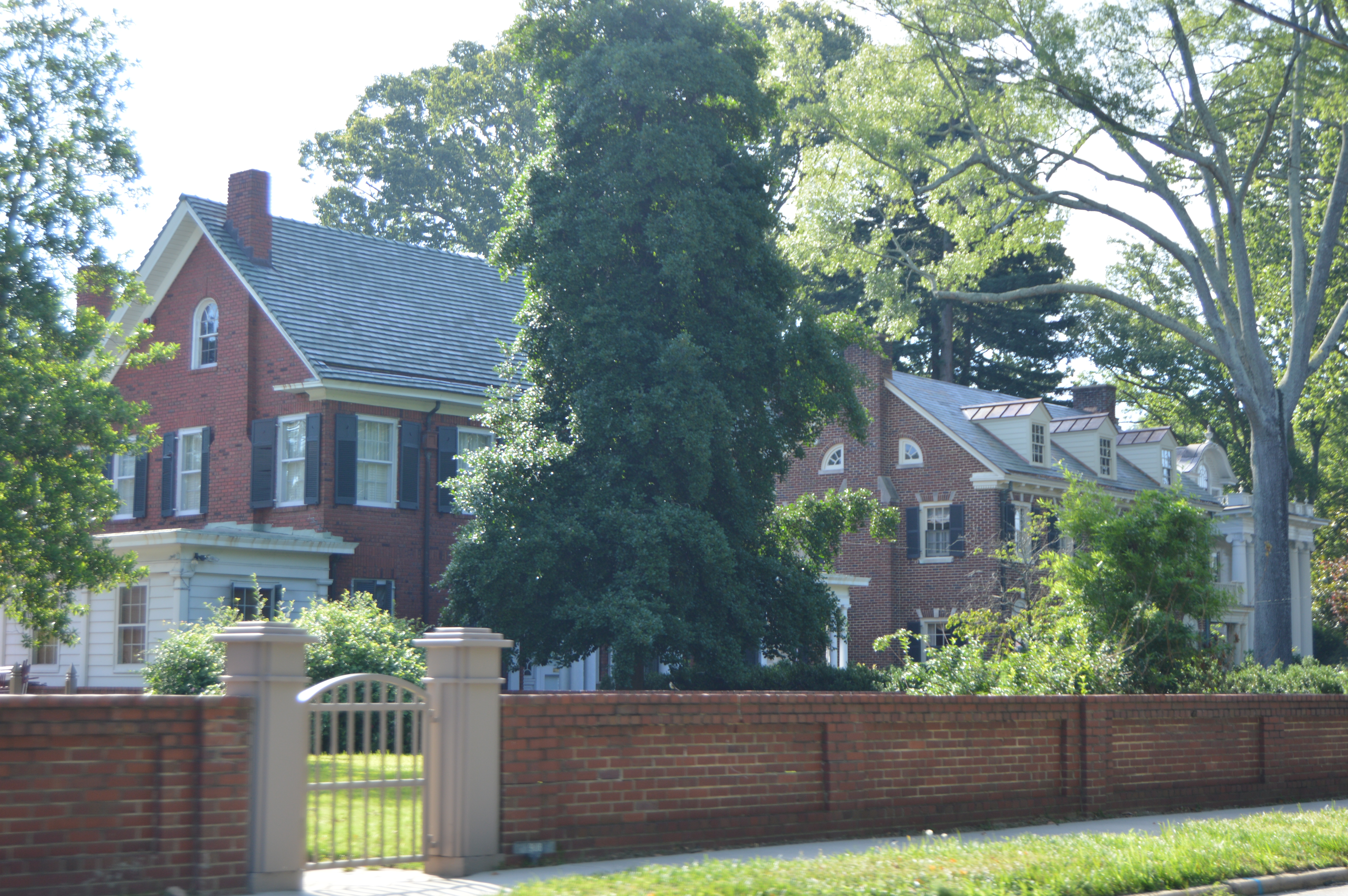
- Nash north of Raleigh Road

- Location within North Carolina Location within the United States
- Location: West Nash St., Wilson, North Carolina
- Coordinates: 35°44′18″N 77°55′14″W
- Area: 51 acres (21 ha)
- Built: 1899
- Architect: Solon Balias Moore, et al.
- Architectural style: Colonial Revival, Bungalow/craftsman
- NRHP reference No.: 84001033
- Added to NRHP: December 20, 1984

West Nash Street Historic District is a national historic district located at Wilson, Wilson County, North Carolina. It encompasses 79 contributing buildings in a predominantly residential section of Wilson. The district largely developed during the 1910s and 1920s and includes notable examples of Colonial Revival and Bungalow / American Craftsman style architecture. Notable buildings include the William W. Graves House, Selby Hurt· Anderson House, Williams-Cozart House, John T. Barnes House, Graham-Woodard House, M. Douglas Aycock House (1925-1928), John D. Gold House, Boykin's Filling Station, and West End Grocery.

It was listed on the National Register of Historic Places in 1984.

== Notable residents ==
- Daisy Hendley Gold, American author and journalist
