= Progressive Primitive Baptists =

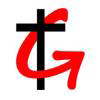
- Region: United States/Haiti
- Separated from: Particular Baptists
- Places of worship: 95
- Publications: The Banner Herald

Progressive Primitive Baptists are a Christian denomination comprising 95 churches located in nine US states and one church in Haiti. The denominational name consists of three parts. They are identified with the Baptist tradition as they baptize only believers who have made a profession of faith and they only baptize by immersion. The word Primitive in the name refers to their adherence to the original principles of their Baptist ancestors, the Particular Baptists of England. Their articles of faith are based on the 1689 Baptist Confession of Faith. The word Progressive refers to their inclusion of musical instruments, bible studies, youth camps, mission and charity organizations that are rejected by other factions of Primitive Baptists, often referred to as "old line" or "old school".

== Controversy over use of musical instruments ==
In the early 1900s, Associations of the Primitive Baptists in the state of Georgia began to exclude churches from their membership that utilized the organ in worship services. The churches that utilized instrumental music in worship began to be known as Progressive Primitive Baptists. These churches formed their own Associations and became the Progressive Primitive Baptist denomination.

The minutes of the 1907 Echeconnee Association (in Central Georgia) record an exclusion of churches and include this resolution outlining the Association's stance:

Resolution Whereas, the Primitive Baptists have been greatly disturbed by the introduction of new and unscriptural practices in their worship, viz; Instrumental music, secret orders and other things of like character; therefore, be it Resolved, That we declare against these measures in our churches together with all others that practice or affiliate with the same.

== Division ==
The Augusta Chronicle noted this division, in a newspaper article of October 8, 1909, detailing two separate Primitive Baptist groups, naming one side as the Progressive Primitive Baptists:

Churches of Progressive and Non-Progressive Primitives Met in Emanuel County

Swainsboro, Ga., October 7 – The Primitive Baptists of Emanuel, Bulloch and Jefferson counties have just closed their annual association, the Progressive Primitives holding their meeting at Bethesda church near Wadley and the Non-Progressive Primitives holding their meeting at New Hope church in this county.

Before a split in the Primitive Baptist ranks which occurred about a year ago, these two bodies formed the Upper Canoochee Association and consisted of nineteen churches embracing a large membership, but because a large percentage of the churches advocated the use of organs in their churches as well as the principle that they should pay their preachers, no longer adhering to the old primitive methods, the association split asunder, both calling themselves Upper Canoochee Association, and that a spirit of unfriendliness exists between them is shown by the fact that they both held their associations on the same dates…

== The Primitive Baptist Foundation ==
The Primitive Baptist Foundation was incorporated in Miami, Florida, January 28, 1941. The general purpose of the Foundation as set out in the Constitution and by-Laws is:

“The general nature or the object of the corporation is to assist, maintain or support aged ministers of the Primitive Baptist Church who are unable to serve churches, or are without sufficient funds to live on, and also to assist, maintain and support the widows of ministers of the Primitive Baptist Church when such is needed; to assist, maintain and support any of the pastors; and such other things, in conformity with this Charter, as may be needful and necessary for the Primitive Baptist cause.”

The principal functions of the Foundation over the years, as provided for in the original by-laws, have been to give assistance to ministers, widows of ministers, and small churches; to publish the Bible Study material; publish the song book; to promote ministerial education and development; and make loans to churches. In 1986 a Ministers Retirement Program was established, under which the Foundation matches funds paid into the plan by the Ministers. In 1997 the Progressive Primitive Baptist Library and Archives became a part of the Foundation.

== The Banner Herald ==
The Progressive Primitive cause and unification was aided by the publication of a monthly periodical edited by R.H. Barwick and William H. Crouse, called The Pilgrim's Banner. In 1918, this periodical merged with the Primitive Herald and became known as The Banner-Herald. The merged paper was owned by a committee of Progressive Primitive Baptists.

Today, The Banner Herald remains the denomination’s magazine and it publishes the annual directory of Progressive Primitive Baptist churches.

The Banner-Herald resulted from the merger of two previous publications: The Pilgrim's Banner, which began publication in 1894; and the Primitive Herald, which began publication in 1916. The two publications merged in 1918, naming the new publication, "The Banner-Herald," taking part of the name from the two previous publications.

== PBYF Youth Camps ==
Regional Summer Youth Camps began in the denomination in 1947 in Georgia. They were organized with the acronym PBYF which stands for Primitive Baptist Youth Fellowship. Camps are owned by the denominational churches in four states; Florida, Georgia, Tennessee, and Texas. A youth camp is held the first week in June for the Central States each year. It is located in Illinois at Lake Sallateeska. It has met since 1948.

== The Music Workshop ==
A week-long music seminar for the aid of worship leaders and choir members is held each year in July at Camp Hillview in Claxton, Georgia. The Music Workshop has been held annually since 1963. A music scholarship is awarded each year to help further the education of youth interested in music and worship.
