= Bell Fork, North Carolina =

Bell's Fork, North Carolina
- Unincorporated community
- Location within North Carolina Location within the United States
- Coordinates: 35°33′54″N 77°20′58″W
- Country: United States
- State: North Carolina
- County: Pitt
- Elevation: 72 ft (22 m)
- Time zone: UTC-5 (Eastern (EST))
  - Summer (DST): UTC-4 (EDT)
- Area code: 252
- GNIS feature ID: 980939

Bell's Fork is an unincorporated community in Pitt County, North Carolina, United States. Bell's Fork is located on North Carolina Highway 43 at the southeastern border of Greenville.

Red Banks Primitive Baptist Church, which is listed on the National Register of Historic Places, is located in Bell's Fork.
