= Smithwick's Creek Primitive Baptist Church =

Historic church in North Carolina, United States

- U.S. National Register of Historic Places
- Location within North Carolina Location within the United States
- Location: Jct. of NC 1106 at NC 1516, near Farm Life, North Carolina
- Coordinates: 35°43′28″N 77°2′16″W
- Area: 3.5 acres (1.4 ha)
- Built: 1892, c. 1897
- Architectural style: Front-gable
- NRHP reference No.: 05000324
- Added to NRHP: April 20, 2005

Smithwick's Creek Primitive Baptist Church is a historic Primitive Baptist church located near Farm Life, Martin County, North Carolina. It was built about 1897, and is a front-gable, unadorned frame building. The building measures 44 feet, 4 inches, wide and 60 feet, 4 inches deep. The interior was historically divided by gender, with men and women sitting separately until approximately the mid-20th century. Also on the property is the former Smithwick's Creek Baptismal House, built in 1892 and moved to site November 2003.

It was added to the National Register of Historic Places in 2005.
