= Pleasant Daniel Gold =

American clergyman and publisher

- Born: March 25, 1833; Rutherford County, North Carolina, U.S.
- Died: June 7, 1920 (aged 87); Mebane, Alamance County, North Carolina, U.S.
- Resting place: Maplewood Cemetery
- Education: Furman University; Southern Baptist Theological Seminary
- Occupations: publisher, minister, businessman, lawyer
- Spouse(s): Julia Pipkin (1863-1913; her death); Eugenia Alice Roberts
- Children: 11
- Parent(s): Milton Gold; Martha Fortune

Pleasant Daniel Gold (March 25, 1833 – June 7, 1920) was an American publisher, lawyer, and Baptist minister. Ordained as a Primitive Baptist minister in the Kehukee Association, he was a prominent Baptist leader in North Carolina for over half-a-century. He served as a minister in Rocky Mount, Goldsboro, Wilson, Tarboro, and Durham. In 1867 he co-founded the Baptist newspaper Zion's Landmark, serving as editor until 1920. In 1902 he founded the P.D. Gold Publishing Company, which issued two newspapers for Wilson County.

== Biography ==
Gold was born on March 25, 1833, in a part of Rutherford County that was later incorporated into Cleveland County. He was the son of Milton Gold, a farmer, and Martha Fortune Gold. His grandfather, Daniel Gold, had moved to North Carolina from Virginia in 1798. He worked on his family's farm until he was twenty, when he borrowed money to attend college. Gold studied law and received his law license in 1856. Gold worked as an attorney at a law firm in Shelby.

Gold left the law practice and enrolled at Furman University to study theology, transferring to Southern Baptist Theological Seminary with hopes of becoming a Missionary Baptist minister. While he was at seminary, the American Civil War began. He left school to enlist in the Confederate States Army, serving as a chaplain and nurse until a fever ended his military service.

In the 1860s Gold left the Missionary Baptist Church and became a Primitive Baptist, joining the Kehukee Primitive Baptist Church in Halifax. He was baptized and ordained as an elder and a pastor at Kehukee Baptist Church. He served as a Baptist minister in Wilson, Rocky Mount, Tarboro, and in Durham. He was a leading figure in the Primitive Baptist community of North Carolina for over half a century.

In 1863, while serving as a Baptist pastor in Goldsboro, Gold met and married Julia Pipkin, a daughter of Willis Pipkin of Lenoir County. They had eleven children before Pipkin's death in 1913. He later married Eugenia Alice Roberts of Winston-Salem, with whom he had no children.

In 1867, with L.I. Bodenheimer, he co-founded Zion's Landmark, a Baptist newspaper. He became the associate editor in 1871 and was made editor the following year. He served as editor of Zion's Landmark until 1920. The paper became the leading publication of the Primitive Baptist Church. In 1902 Gold founded the P.D. Gold Publishing Company, which issued The Daily Times and The Semi-Weekly Times. The company was later incorporated as The Wilson Daily Times Publishing Company. He handed over the publishing company to his son, John Daniel Gold, who was married to author Daisy Hendley Gold and founded the Wilson Times, in 1896. Two more of Gold's sons, Pleasant Daniel Gold Jr. and Charles Willis Gold, co-founded the Jefferson Standard Life Insurance Company in 1907. In 1912 the company completed merges with two other companies, Security Life and Annuity Company and Greensboro Life Insurance Company, moving the headquarters to Greensboro. The Gold brothers later stepped down and handed the company over to Julian Price.

Gold died in Mebane in 1920 and is buried at Maplewood Cemetery in Wilson.
