= Goshen Primitive Baptist Church =

Historic church in Kentucky, United States

- U.S. National Register of Historic Places
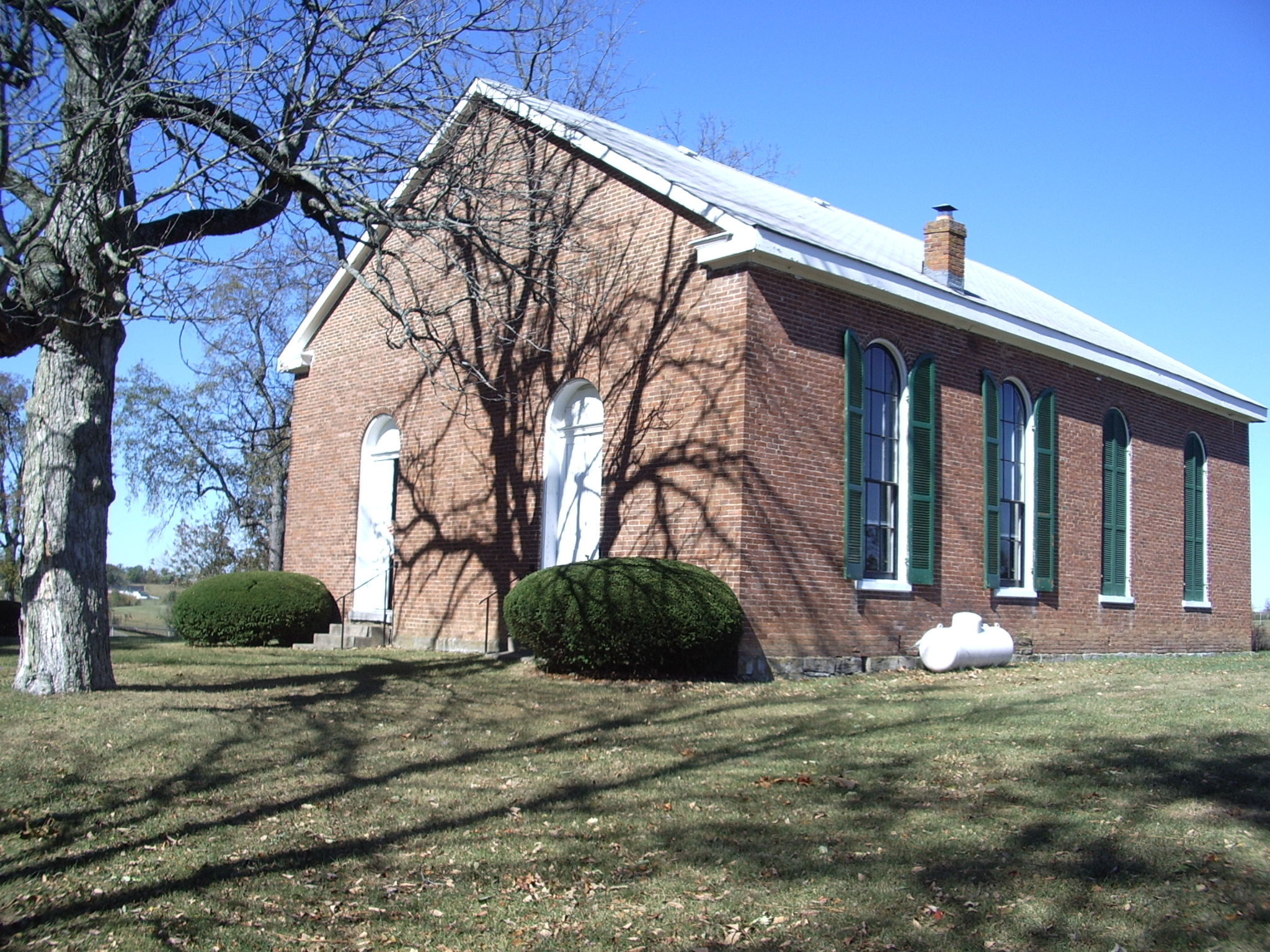
- Goshen Primitive Baptist Church

- Location within Kentucky Location within the United States
- Nearest city: Winchester, Kentucky
- Coordinates: 38°1′8″N 84°4′15″W
- Built: c.1850
- MPS: Clark County MRA
- NRHP reference No.: 79003583
- Added to NRHP: August 1, 1979

The Goshen Primitive Baptist Church is a historic Primitive Baptist church in Winchester, Kentucky. The congregation was founded in 1792. Its brick church building was built in c.1850. It was added to the National Register of Historic Places in 1979.

It has Greek Revival-style original details.

== See also ==
- National Register of Historic Places listings in Kentucky
