= Randall House Publications =

- Industry: Publishing
- Genre: Christian
- Founded: 1962
- Headquarters: Nashville, Tennessee
- Revenue: $4 million (2007)
- Number of employees: 40+
- Website: RandallHouse.com

Randall House Publications is an American publisher of Christian literature and church resources based in Nashville, Tennessee. Randall House has 11 departments: Administrative, Book Division, Training, Design, Distribution, Digital/IT, Editorial, Marketing, Printing, Sales, and Student & Children's Ministry.

== History ==
In 1935, the National Association of Free Will Baptists (NAFWB) selected Rev. Winford Davis of Missouri to become the first Sunday School Secretary. Only three years later, the NAFWB elected the first Sunday School Board, which developed the National Sunday School Convention (NSSC) in 1940. Since 1940, the work of the Sunday School Board has been promoted via the NSSC. In order to increase participation, the Sunday School Board brought back that work under the direct supervision of the Board in 1947. In 1950, the NSSC voted to dissolve as a separate entity.

The NAFWB launched their own Free Will Baptist-produced Sunday School literature program in 1958. It was shut down in 1959 due to financial difficulties and was reopened in 1962. In 1962, Roger Reeds became the first full-time General Director of the Sunday School Department (SS Department). In 1972 the SS Department adopted Randall House Publications as their trade name in honor of Benjamin Randall, the founder of the Northern line of Free Will Baptists.

In 1994, Dr. Roger Reeds retired, and Dr. Alton Loveless became the new Executive Director. In 2002, Loveless retired, and Ron Hunter Jr. became the third Executive Director and CEO of Randall House Publications. In 2007, the NAFWB renamed itself to "Randall House Publications of the National Association of Free Will Baptists".
