= Aldie, Virginia =

Census-designated place in Virginia, US

- Census-designated place
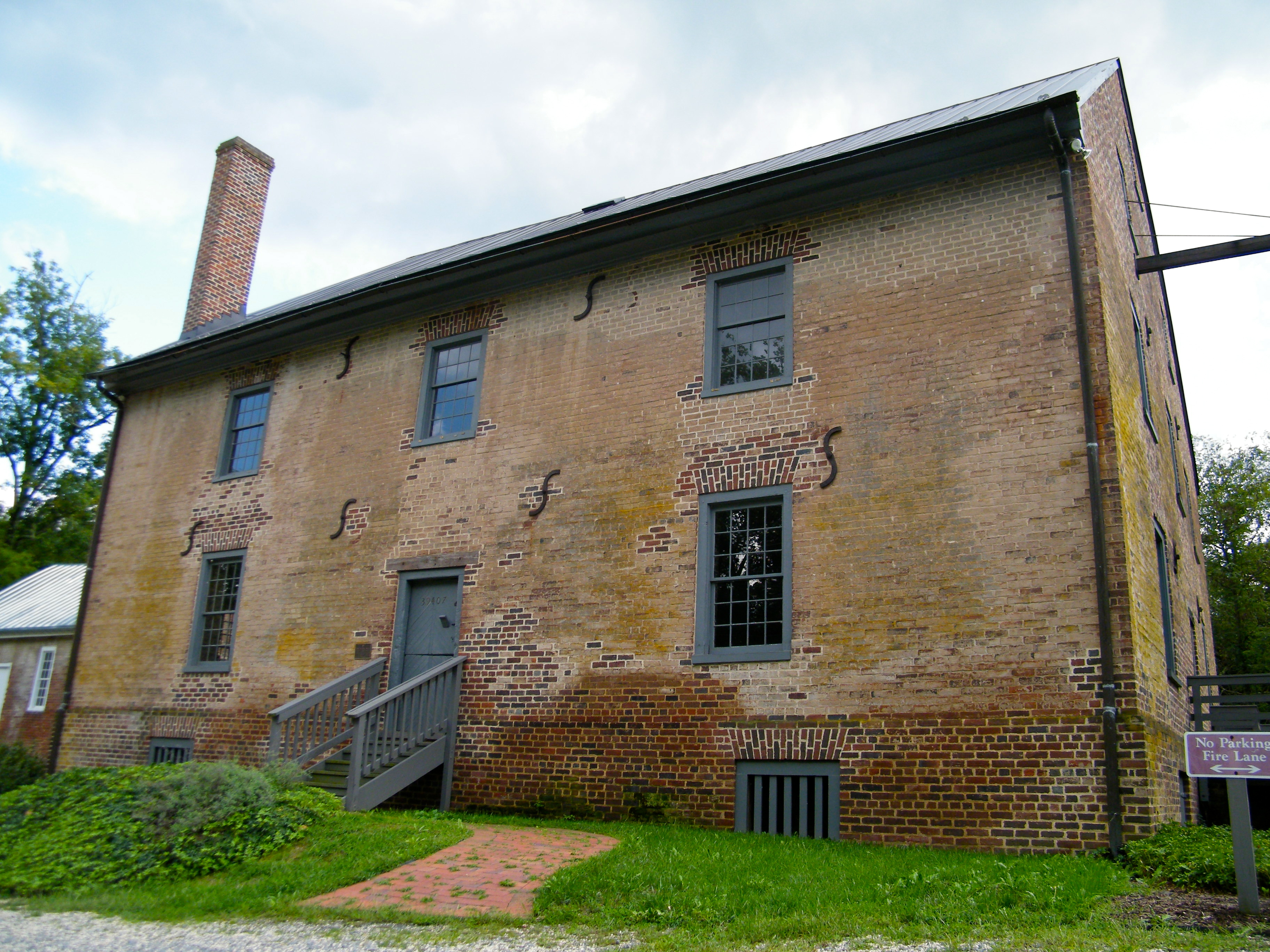
- The Aldie Mill in September 2011

- Location within Northern Virginia Location within Virginia Location within the United States
- Coordinates: 38°58′32″N 77°38′29″W
- Country: United States
- State: Virginia
- County: Loudoun

Area
  - Total: 0.25 sq mi (0.64 km^{2})
  - Land: 0.24 sq mi (0.63 km^{2})
  - Water: 0.0039 sq mi (0.01 km^{2})
- Elevation: 340 ft (100 m)

Population (2020)
  - Total: 70
  - Density: 290/sq mi (110/km^{2})
- Time zone: UTC−5 (Eastern (EST))
  - Summer (DST): UTC−4 (EDT)
- ZIP Code: 20105
- FIPS code: 51-00772
- GNIS feature ID: 1495187

Aldie is an unincorporated community and census-designated place (CDP) located between Chantilly and Middleburg in Loudoun County, Virginia, United States. The historic village of Aldie is located on the John Mosby Highway (U.S. Route 50) in a gap between the Catoctin Mountains and Bull Run Mountains, through which the Little River flows. Aldie traditionally serves as the gateway to the Loudoun Valley and beyond.

The Aldie CDP was first drawn prior to the 2020 census and comprises solely the historic village. As of 2014, the Aldie postal area (ZIP Code 20105), covering a much greater area than the CDP, had a population of 11,420 people, a 569% increase since 2000 making it one of the fastest-growing suburbs in the Washington metropolitan area and the second-fastest growing ZIP Code in Virginia. The Aldie ZIP Code 20105 has currently the highest median sales prices for houses sold in Loudoun County. As a result, the eastern part is suburbanized with numerous upscale communities recently built or under construction while most of the Aldie Hills adjacent to the village of Aldie have so far largely preserved their bucolic character with farms, wineries and custom homes.

It was first listed as a CDP in the 2020 census with a population of 70.

== History ==
Aldie's beginnings were laid in 1765 when James Mercer and George Mercer established a mill at the location of the present historic edifice. The location was a natural choice, as the gap contained the intersection of the Belhaven Road between Winchester and Alexandria and the Mountain Road which ran northwest to Snickers Gap. By 1809 the Little River Turnpike was completed from Alexandria to the Mercer Mill, replacing the older rutted section of Belhaven Road. With the opening of the road, James Mercer's son, Charles Fenton Mercer, in a partnership with William Cooke, set out to develop a village on 30 acres (120,000 m^{2}) at the turnpike's western terminus. Mercer named the village for Castle Aldie, his Scottish clan's ancestral home.

By 1811 a post office had been established in the village. Two years later, the Ashby's Gap Turnpike was completed from Aldie to Middleburg, and in 1818 the Snickersville Turnpike opened, replacing the Mountain Road. By the census of 1820, Aldie had a population of 248 residents, making it the fourth largest town in the county. The population peaked in 1830 at 260—notably more than half, 132, were slaves. With the incorporation of Middleburg the following year, Aldie began a slow decline. During the Civil War, the village itself and lands immediately to the west and northwest were the site of the Battle of Aldie during the Gettysburg campaign. In addition, the Confederate partisan John Singleton Mosby was active in the village, and several small skirmishes between Union cavalry and his band of rangers took place in and around Aldie.

Aldie's most famous resident was President James Monroe, who constructed his private residence at Oak Hill in 1822.

The Aldie Mill Historic District, Furr Farm, Loudoun Agricultural and Mechanical Institute and Mount Zion Old School Baptist Church are listed on the National Register of Historic Places.

== Arts and culture ==
The town hosts two annual festivals: in May the Treasures on the Turnpike, and in October the Harvest Festival.

=== Landmarks and other points of interest ===
Aldie has three sites listed on the National Register of Historic Places. This includes the Aldie Mill Historic District, which includes the Aldie Mill and other historical buildings, the Loudoun Agricultural and Mechanical Institute, and the Mount Zion Old School Baptist Church.

Gilbert's Corner Regional Park is also located in Aldie next to Mount Zion Old School Baptist Church and offers trails and a view of the Bull Run Mountains and Blue Ridge Mountains.

== Education ==
The Aldie area is served by Aldie Elementary School, Arcola Elementary School, Buffalo Trail Elementary, Goshen Post Elementary School, Pinebrook Elementary School, Hovatter Elementary School, Henrietta Lacks Elementary School, Mercer Middle School, Willard Middle School, John Champe High School, and Lightridge High School.

== Demographics ==
Aldie first appeared as a census designated place in the 2020 U.S. census.

== Notable people ==
- Al Grey, jazz trombonist
- James Monroe, 5th President of the United States.
