= Glennville, Georgia =

- City
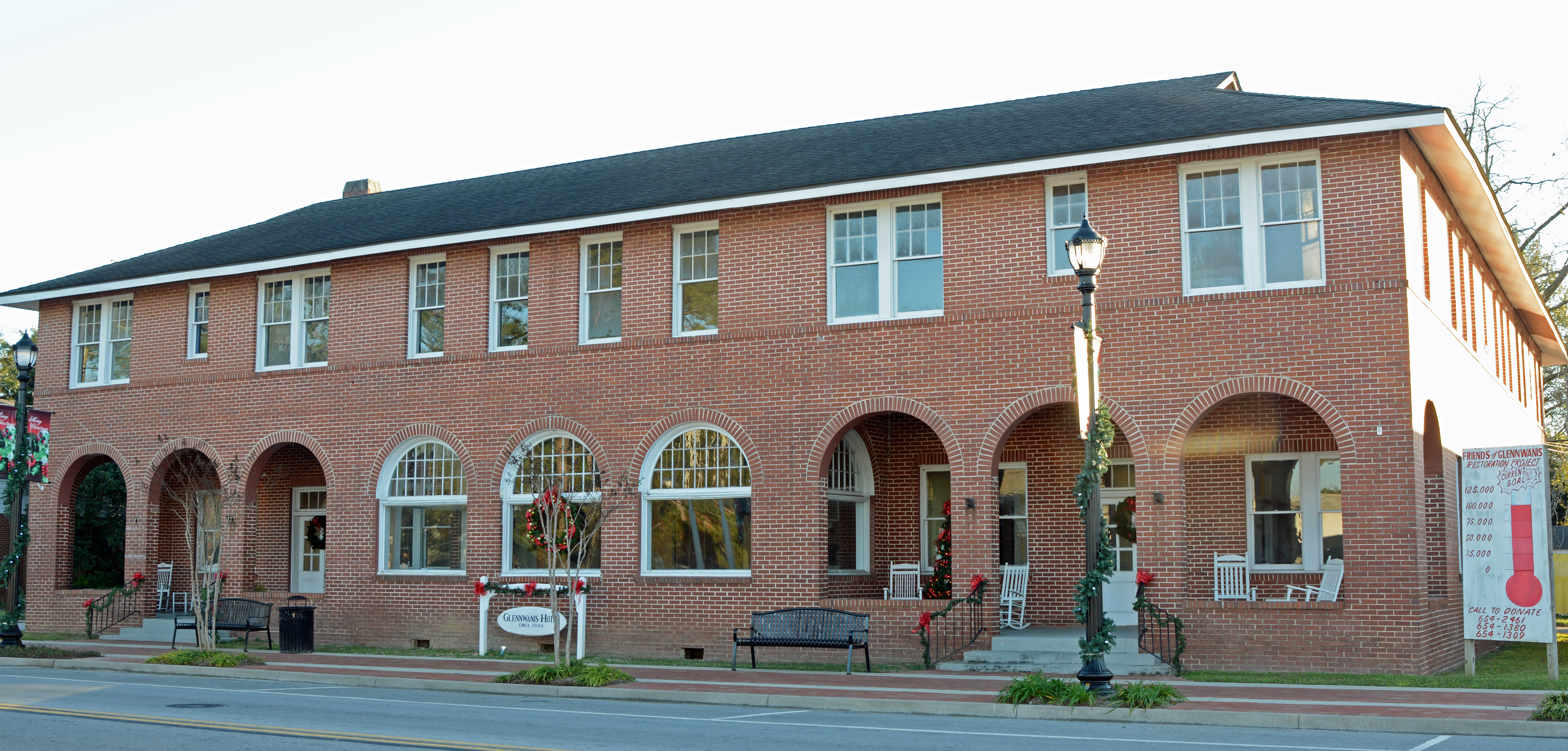
- Glennwanis Hotel, East Barnard Street; Downtown Glennville, GA

- Wordmark

- Location in Tattnall County and the state of Georgia
- Coordinates: 31.937°N 81.929°W
- Country: United States
- State: Georgia
- County: Tattnall

Government
  - Mayor: Bernie Weaver

Area
  - Total: 7.13 sq mi (18.47 km^{2})
  - Land: 7.05 sq mi (18.26 km^{2})
  - Water: 0.081 sq mi (0.21 km^{2})
- Elevation: 171 ft (52 m)

Population (2020)
  - Total: 3,834
  - Density: 543.9/sq mi (210.01/km^{2})
- Time zone: UTC-5 (Eastern (EST))
  - Summer (DST): UTC-4 (EDT)
- ZIP code: 30427
- Area code: 912
- FIPS code: 13-33336
- GNIS feature ID: 0331820
- Website: glennvillega.gov

Glennville is a city in southeastern Tattnall County, Georgia, United States. As of the 2020 census, the town had a population of 3,834.

== Geography ==
Glennville lies within the coastal plain of Georgia, surrounded by farmland and forest. The Altamaha River is 10 miles (16 km) to the southwest. Less than 2 miles to the east of Glennville, Beards Creek forms the border with Long County; just east of the creek is the edge of Fort Stewart. The nearest major city is Savannah, approximately 50 miles (80 km) east of Glennville. Baxley, Georgia, is 29 miles (47 km) southwest of Glennville.

According to the United States Census Bureau, as of 2020 the city had a total area of 7.13 square miles (18.5 km^{2}), of which 7.05 square miles (18.3 km^{2}) was land and 0.08 square miles (0.21 km^{2}) was water.

=== Major highways ===
There are multiple partial concurrencies among route numbers; descriptions are omitted here for simplicity:

- US 25 / US 301 (Main Street); travels north–south through downtown.
- SR 23 / SR 57 (Barnard Street from downtown to northwest; South Main Street from downtown southward)
- SR 73 (North Main Street)
- SR 144 (Barnard Street through downtown, and northwest to Hencart Road; Hencart Road to southwest)

=== Climate ===
Climate data for Glennville, Georgia (1991–2020 normals, extremes 1946–present)
Month	Jan	Feb	Mar	Apr	May	Jun	Jul	Aug	Sep	Oct	Nov	Dec	Year
Record high °F (°C)	84 (29)	87 (31)	94 (34)	97 (36)	103 (39)	110 (43)	113 (45)	105 (41)	106 (41)	98 (37)	89 (32)	85 (29)	113 (45)
Mean maximum °F (°C)	77.0 (25.0)	79.9 (26.6)	85.0 (29.4)	89.3 (31.8)	94.5 (34.7)	98.5 (36.9)	100.0 (37.8)	98.4 (36.9)	95.3 (35.2)	89.0 (31.7)	83.8 (28.8)	78.2 (25.7)	100.9 (38.3)
Mean daily maximum °F (°C)	60.6 (15.9)	64.7 (18.2)	71.3 (21.8)	78.6 (25.9)	85.2 (29.6)	90.1 (32.3)	92.3 (33.5)	91.2 (32.9)	86.6 (30.3)	78.9 (26.1)	69.9 (21.1)	62.8 (17.1)	77.7 (25.4)
Daily mean °F (°C)	49.0 (9.4)	52.5 (11.4)	58.7 (14.8)	65.5 (18.6)	72.9 (22.7)	79.3 (26.3)	81.9 (27.7)	81.1 (27.3)	76.4 (24.7)	67.1 (19.5)	57.8 (14.3)	51.4 (10.8)	66.1 (18.9)
Mean daily minimum °F (°C)	37.5 (3.1)	40.4 (4.7)	46.0 (7.8)	52.4 (11.3)	60.7 (15.9)	68.5 (20.3)	71.5 (21.9)	71.0 (21.7)	66.2 (19.0)	55.2 (12.9)	45.6 (7.6)	40.1 (4.5)	54.6 (12.6)
Mean minimum °F (°C)	22.7 (−5.2)	25.7 (−3.5)	30.5 (−0.8)	38.7 (3.7)	49.2 (9.6)	61.9 (16.6)	67.1 (19.5)	65.6 (18.7)	54.9 (12.7)	41.0 (5.0)	30.9 (−0.6)	25.5 (−3.6)	20.1 (−6.6)
Record low °F (°C)	1 (−17)	11 (−12)	17 (−8)	28 (−2)	40 (4)	52 (11)	59 (15)	52 (11)	40 (4)	28 (−2)	13 (−11)	9 (−13)	1 (−17)
Average precipitation inches (mm)	3.83 (97)	3.78 (96)	3.86 (98)	3.01 (76)	3.50 (89)	5.96 (151)	5.32 (135)	7.48 (190)	3.33 (85)	3.59 (91)	2.55 (65)	3.56 (90)	49.77 (1,264)
Average precipitation days	8.4	7.7	6.5	6.4	6.4	9.5	9.8	10.9	7.1	5.7	5.6	7.2	91.2
Source: NOAA

== Demographics ==
Historical population
Census	Pop.	Note	%±
1900	269		—
1910	640		137.9%
1920	1,069		67.0%
1930	1,503		40.6%
1940	1,674		11.4%
1950	2,327		39.0%
1960	2,791		19.9%
1970	2,965		6.2%
1980	4,144		39.8%
1990	3,676		−11.3%
2000	3,641		−1.0%
2010	3,569		−2.0%
2020	3,834		7.4%
U.S. Decennial Census

=== 2020 census ===
As of the 2020 census, Glennville had a population of 3,834. The median age was 38.0 years. 26.5% of residents were under the age of 18 and 19.1% were 65 years of age or older. For every 100 females, there were 85.8 males, and for every 100 females age 18 and over, there were 80.6 males age 18 and over.

0.0% of residents lived in urban areas, while 100.0% lived in rural areas.

There were 1,523 households in Glennville, including 1,071 families. Of all households, 35.2% had children under the age of 18 living in them, 34.3% were married-couple households, 19.2% were households with a male householder and no spouse or partner present, and 40.2% were households with a female householder and no spouse or partner present. About 33.0% of all households were made up of individuals, and 15.8% had someone living alone who was 65 years of age or older.

There were 1,784 housing units, of which 14.6% were vacant. The homeowner vacancy rate was 1.7% and the rental vacancy rate was 8.8%.

Glennville racial composition as of 2020
Race	Num.	Perc.
White (non-Hispanic)	2,037	53.13%
Black or African American (non-Hispanic)	1,318	34.38%
Native American	8	0.21%
Asian	57	1.49%
Pacific Islander	3	0.08%
Other/Mixed	127	3.31%
Hispanic or Latino	284	7.41%

== Economy ==
The Georgia Department of Corrections provides jobs for hundreds of people within Tattnall County and surrounding counties. Smith State Prison, a close-security facility, is located 2 miles north of Glennville. The facility can house 1000+ inmates at any given time.

The city is known for farming crickets to use as animal feed, as well as for pecans.

== Media ==
The Journal Sentinel of Tattnall County, with offices in the county seat of Reidsville as well as in Glennville, has been published since 1879.

== In popular culture ==
Glennville is the principal setting of Eternal Fire, a novel by Georgia-born author Calder Willingham.

== Historic structures ==
- Beards Creek Primitive Baptist Church, 5 miles northeast of town, was established in 1804.
- The Glennwanis Hotel, located in downtown Glennville, was built in 1926. It was added to the National Register of Historic Places in 2003.

== Notable people ==
- Osjha Anderson, Miss Georgia 1999
- Laura Belle Barnard, missionary, humanitarian, and educator; author of The Biblical Basis of Missions
- Beach Dickerson, Hollywood actor & producer who worked frequently with director Roger Corman
- Jesse Finch, US roster for baseball at 1956 Olympics in Melbourne, Australia
- Mason G. Rhodes, former athlete at Paine College; Rio Olympian and Paralympian in track and field, 2016
- Shannon Sharpe, co-host of ESPN First Take, former co-host of FS1 Undisputed, former football analyst for CBS, former collegiate and professional football player with Savannah State University and the Denver Broncos, 2011 Pro Football Hall of Fame inductee, brother of Sterling Sharpe
- Sterling Sharpe, former collegiate and professional football player with the University of South Carolina and the Green Bay Packers. 2014 College Football Hall of Fame inductee, 2025 Pro Football Hall of Fame inductee, brother of Shannon Sharpe
- Cole Swindell, American country music singer–songwriter
- Drew Tarver, actor and comedian; brother of Katelyn Tarver
- Katelyn Tarver, singer, actress, and model; sister of Drew Tarver
