= Primitive Baptists =

Conservative Baptists adhering to a degree of Calvinist beliefs

Primitive Baptist churches
- Classification: Primitive Baptists
- Orientation: Conservative
- Theology: Calvinistic Baptist
- Polity: Congregational
- Region: United States, mainly in the southern states
- Origin: 19th century
- Separations: Missionary Baptists

Primitive Baptists – also known as Regular Baptists, Old School Baptists, Foot Washing Baptists, anti-missions Baptists, or, derisively, Hard Shell Baptists – are conservative Baptists adhering to a degree of Calvinist beliefs that coalesced out of the controversy among Baptists in the early 19th century over the appropriateness of mission boards, tract societies, and temperance societies. Primitive Baptists are a subset of the Calvinistic Baptist tradition. The adjective "primitive" in the name is used in the sense of "original".

== History ==
The controversy over whether churches or their members should participate in mission boards, Bible tract societies, and temperance societies led the Primitive Baptists to separate from other general Baptist groups that supported such organizations, and to make declarations of opposition to such organizations in articles like the Kehukee Association Declaration of 1827. The Kehukee Primitive Baptist Church released a proclamation that they rejected formal service institutions outside of the church. The declaration proposed that

Upon examination, it was found that most of the churches had given their opinions; and after an interchange of sentiments among the members of this body, it was agreed that we discard all Missionary Societies, Bible Societies and Theological Seminaries, and the practices heretofore resorted to for their support, in begging money from the public; and if any persons should be among us, as agents of any of said societies, we hereafter discountenance them in those practices; and if under a character of a minister of the gospel, we will not invite them into our pulpits; believing these societies and institutions to be the inventions of men, and not warranted from the word of God. We further do unanimously agree that should any of the members of our churches join the fraternity of Masons, or, being members, continue to visit the lodges and parades, we will not invite them to preach in our pulpits, believing them to be guilty of such practices; and we declare non-fellowship with them and such practices altogether.

The official split between "Old School" and "New School" Baptists occurred during a meeting at the Black Rock Church on September 28, 1832 in Butler, MD. This became known as the Black Rock Address.

Primitive Baptist churches arose in the mountainous regions of the American South, where they are found in their greatest numbers.

African-American Primitive Baptist groups have been considered a unique category of Primitive Baptist. Approximately 50,000 African Americans are affiliated with African-American Primitive Baptist churches as of 2005. Approximately 64,000 people were affiliated (as of 1995) with Primitive Baptist churches in the various other emergences of Primitive Baptists.

Since arising in the 19th century, the influence of Primitive Baptists has waned as "Missionary Baptists became the mainstream".

== Theological views ==
Primitive Baptists reject some elements of classical Reformed theology, such as infant baptism and avoid the term "Calvinist". They are still Calvinist in the sense of holding strongly to the Five Points of Calvinism and they explicitly reject Arminianism. They are also characterized by "intense conservatism".

One branch, the Primitive Baptist Universalist church of central Appalachia, developed their own unique Trinitarian Universalist theology as an extension of the irresistible grace doctrine of Calvinist theology. They were encouraged in this direction by 19th century itinerant Christian universalist preachers of a theological bent similar to that of Hosea Ballou and John Murray.

== Distinct practices ==
Primitive Baptist practices that are distinguishable from those of other Baptists include a cappella singing, family integrated worship, and foot washing.

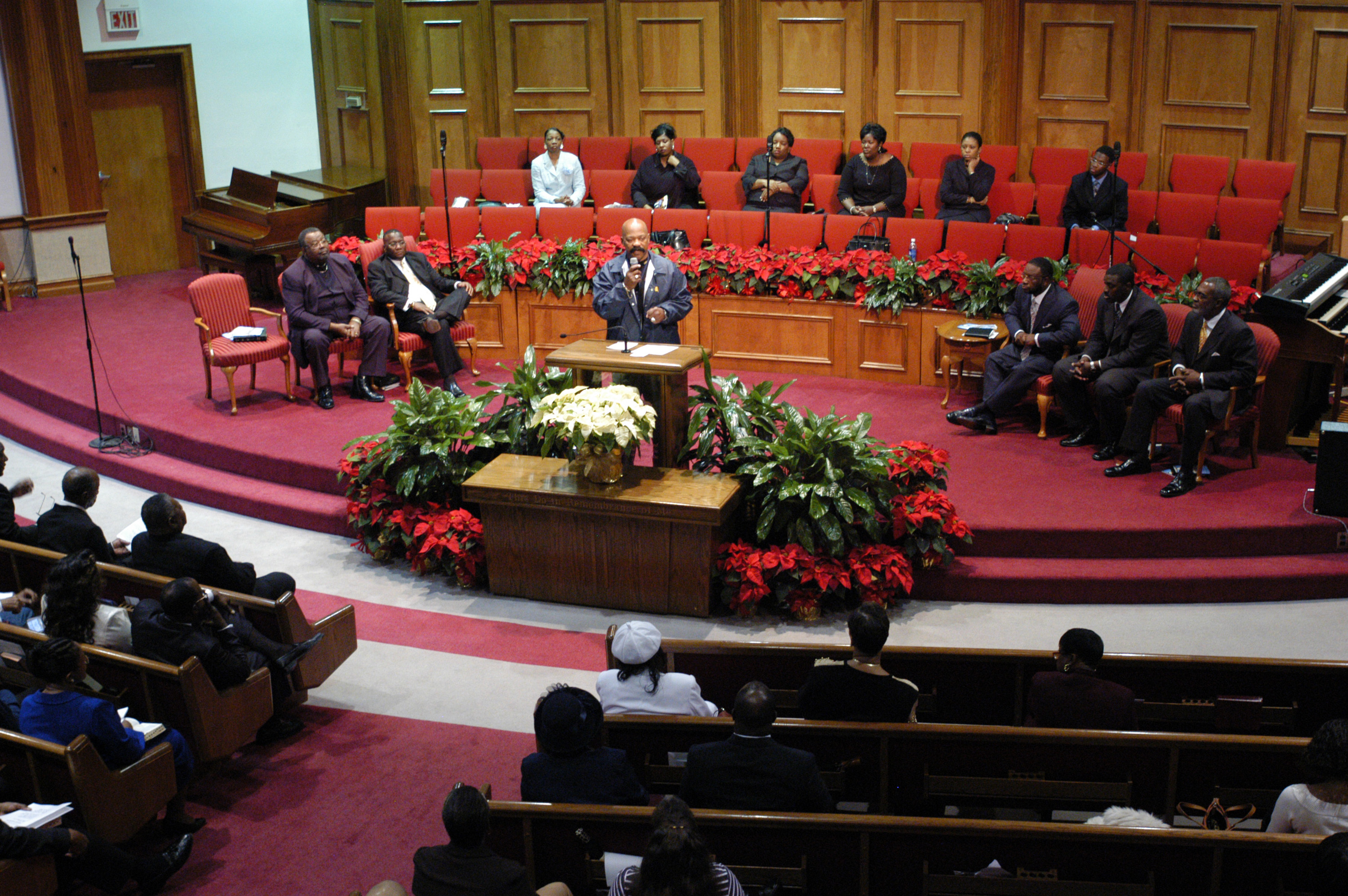
This African-American Primitive Baptist church in Florida is an exception to the usual practice of excluding musical instruments: a piano and organ are visible.

=== A cappella singing ===
Primitive Baptists generally do not play musical instruments as part of their worship services. They believe that all church music should be a cappella because there is no New Testament command to play instruments, but only to sing. They are noted for their singing schools and shape note singing. Further, they connect musical instruments in the Old Testament with "many forms and customs, many types and shadows, many priests with priestly robes, many sacrifices, festivals, tithings" that they see as having been abolished; "had they been needed in the church Christ would have brought them over".

African-American Primitive Baptists may not share the general Primitive Baptist opposition to musical instruments, however.

=== Family integrated worship ===
Primitive Baptists reject the idea of Sunday School, viewing it as unscriptural and interfering with the right of parents to give religious instruction to their children. Instead, children sit with their parents and participate in the church service just like the rest of the congregation.

=== Informal training of preachers ===
Primitive Baptists consider theological seminaries to have "no warrant or sanction from the New Testament, nor in the example of Christ and the apostles".

=== Foot washing ===
Most Primitive Baptists perform foot washing as a symbol of humility and service among the membership. The sexes are separated during the ritual where one person washes the feet of another. The practice is credited with increasing equality, as opposed to hierarchy, within Primitive Baptist churches.

== Notable churches ==
- Mount Zion Old School Baptist Church – Aldie, Virginia
- Goshen Primitive Baptist Church – Winchester, Kentucky
- Primitive Baptist Church of Brookfield – Slate Hill, New York
- Spring Green Primitive Baptist Church – Hamilton, North Carolina
- Smithwick's Creek Primitive Baptist Church – Martin County, North Carolina
- Garden City Primitive Baptist Church – Garden City, Georgia
- Welsh Tract Baptist Church – Newark, Delaware
- Upperville Primitive Baptist Church – Upperville Historic District, Upperville, Virginia
- Love's Chapel Primitive Baptist – Glennville, Georgia

== See also ==
- Primitive Baptist Universalism
- Progressive Primitive Baptists
- Reformed Baptists
- Regular Baptists
- Strict Baptists
- Two-Seed-in-the-Spirit Predestinarian Baptists
