= National Register of Historic Places listings in Martin County, North Carolina =

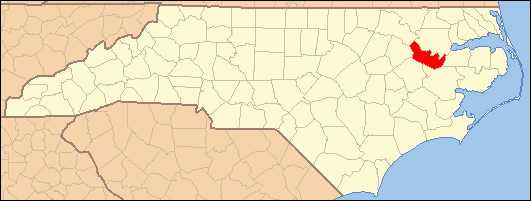

This list includes properties and districts listed on the National Register of Historic Places in Martin County, North Carolina. Click the "Map of all coordinates" link to the right to view an online map of all properties and districts with latitude and longitude coordinates in the table below.

== Current listings ==
This National Park Service list is complete through NPS recent listings posted June 26, 2026.

	Name on the Register	Image	Date listed	Location	City or town	Description
1	Bear Grass Primitive Baptist Church		April 28, 2005 (#05000352)	NW side NC 1001, 0.1 miles N of jct with NC 1106; 35°46′03″N 77°07′42″W	Bear Grass	
2	Bear Grass School		June 1, 2005 (#05000515)	6344 E. Bear Grass Rd. 35°46′05″N 77°07′38″W	Bear Grass	
3	Asa Biggs House and Site	Asa Biggs House and Site	October 10, 1979 (#79003335)	100 E. Church St. 35°51′22″N 77°03′24″W	Williamston	
4	Burras House		March 30, 1978 (#78001962)	On U.S. 64; 35°48′33″N 76°54′05″W	Jamesville	
5	Conoho Creek Historic District		March 12, 1998 (#98000230)	Roughly bounded by Conoho Cr., Salsbury Mill Branch, and 0.5 miles S of NC 142; 35°54′31″N 77°14′21″W	Hassell	
6	Darden Hotel		December 30, 1975 (#75001280)	Main St. 35°56′33″N 77°12′32″W	Hamilton	
7	Everetts Christian Church		April 28, 2005 (#05000351)	109 S. Broad St. 35°49′59″N 77°10′14″W	Everetts	
8	Everetts Historic District		December 2, 2014 (#14000988)	Roughly bounded by Barnhill, Peel, Main, Ayers & James Sts. 35°50′05″N 77°10′15″W	Everetts	
9	First Christian Church	First Christian Church	April 28, 2005 (#05000353)	126 S. Main St. 35°49′22″N 77°15′11″W	Robersonville	
10	Fort Branch Site		June 18, 1973 (#73001358)	SE of Hamilton on SR 1416; 35°55′39″N 77°10′19″W	Hamilton	
11	W. W. Griffin Farm		October 20, 2001 (#01001134)	1871 Wendell Griffin Rd. 35°49′45″N 76°57′29″W	Williamston	
12	Hamilton Historic District		June 3, 1980 (#80002884)	NC 125; 35°56′41″N 77°12′31″W	Hamilton	
13	Hickory Hill		December 20, 1984 (#84000546)	NC 903; 35°56′59″N 77°13′14″W	Hamilton	
14	Jamesville Primitive Baptist Church and Cemetery		December 20, 1984 (#84000556)	E side of NC 171; 35°48′35″N 76°53′51″W	Jamesville	
15	Jesse Fuller Jones House		April 29, 1982 (#82003485)	Off SR 1409; 35°53′02″N 77°11′08″W	Spring Green	
16	W. J. Little House		September 19, 1985 (#85002420)	109 N. Main St. 35°49′30″N 77°15′16″W	Robersonville	
17	Martin County Courthouse	Martin County Courthouse	May 10, 1979 (#79001733)	Main St. 35°51′54″N 77°03′10″W	Williamston	
18	Oak City Christian Church		April 28, 2005 (#05000354)	310 W. Commerce St. 35°57′37″N 77°18′53″W	Oak City	
19	Roberson-Everett-Roebuck House	Roberson-Everett-Roebuck House	August 30, 2010 (#10000602)	105 S. Outerbridge St. 35°49′25″N 77°15′26″W	Robersonville	
20	Robersonville Primitive Baptist Church	Robersonville Primitive Baptist Church	April 20, 2005 (#05000322)	107 N. Outterbridge St. 35°49′28″N 77°15′29″W	Robersonville	Now known as St. James Place Museum
21	Sherrod Farm		December 20, 1984 (#84000552)	W side of NC 125/903; 35°55′31″N 77°12′30″W	Hamilton	
22	Skewarkey Primitive Baptist Church	Skewarkey Primitive Baptist Church	April 28, 2005 (#05000355)	W side of US 17, 0.04 miles S. of jct. with US 64; 35°50′25″N 77°03′54″W	Williamston	
23	Smithwick's Creek Primitive Baptist Church		April 20, 2005 (#05000324)	Jct. of NC 1106 at NC 1516; 35°43′28″N 77°02′16″W	Farm Life	
24	Spring Green Primitive Baptist Church		April 20, 2005 (#05000323)	Jct. of NC 1409 and NC 903; 35°53′40″N 77°11′41″W	Hamilton	
25	Sunny Side Inn	Sunny Side Inn	November 29, 1995 (#95001396)	1102 Washington St. 35°50′32″N 77°03′47″W	Williamston	
26	West Martin School		January 25, 2018 (#100002049)	402 S Cherry St. 35°57′42″N 77°17′58″W	Oak City	
27	Williamston Colored School	Williamston Colored School	July 25, 2014 (#14000445)	705 Washington St. 35°50′45″N 77°03′38″W	Williamston	
28	Williamston Commercial Historic District	Williamston Commercial Historic District	March 9, 1995 (#95000174)	Roughly, areas surrounding the 100 blocks of E. Main, W. Main and S. Smithwick Sts. and the 200 block of Washington St. 35°51′17″N 77°03′21″W	Williamston	
29	Williamston Historic District	Williamston Historic District	October 12, 2001 (#01001095)	Roughly bounded by Franklin, Harrell, Williams, South Haughton, North Railroad, Roberson, and White Sts. 35°51′14″N 77°03′22″W	Williamston	

== See also ==
- National Register of Historic Places listings in North Carolina
- List of National Historic Landmarks in North Carolina
