= Hamilton Historic District =

Hamilton Historic District may refer to:

in the United States

(by state)

- Hamilton Historic District (Carnesville, Georgia), listed on the NRHP in Franklin County, Georgia
- Hamilton Historic District (Hamilton, Massachusetts), NRHP-listed
- Hamilton Historic District (Hamilton, North Carolina), listed on the NRHP in Martin County, North Carolina
- Hamilton Historic Civic Center, Hamilton, Ohio, NRHP-listed
- Fort Hamilton Historic District, Newport, Rhode Island, NRHP-listed
- Hamilton Historic District (Cedarburg, Wisconsin), listed on the NRHP in Ozaukee County, Wisconsin
