= Hickory Hill =

Hickory Hill may refer to several places:

== United States ==
(by state)

- Hickory Hill, Arkansas
- Hickory Hill, Florida
- Hickory Hill (Thomson, Georgia), listed on the NRHP in McDuffie County, Georgia
- Hickory Hill, Illinois
- Another name for the Crenshaw House, Gallatin County, Illinois
- Hickory Hill Park, Iowa City, Iowa
- Hickory Hill, Kentucky
- Hickory Hill, Maryland
- Hickory Hill, Missouri
- Hickory Hill (Clermont, New York), NRHP-listed
- Hickory Hill, North Carolina
- Hickory Hill (Hamilton, North Carolina), listed on the NRHP in Martin County, North Carolina
- Hickory Hill, Oklahoma
- Hickory Hill, Bedford County, Pennsylvania
- Hickory Hill, Chester County, Pennsylvania
- Hickory Hill, South Carolina
- Hickory Hill, Tennessee
- Hickory Hill, Texas
- Hickory Hill (Ashland, Virginia), NRHP-listed
- Hickory Hill (Glasgow, Virginia), listed on the NRHP in Rockbridge County, Virginia
- Hickory Hill (McLean, Virginia), the home of the Robert F. Kennedy family
- Hickory Hill, West Virginia
- Hickory Hill (Petersburg, West Virginia), listed on the NRHP in Hardy County, West Virginia

== See also ==
- Hickory Hills (disambiguation)
