= Everetts =

Everetts may refer to:

- Everetts, North Carolina, USA; a town in Martin County
  - Everetts Historic District
- Everetts Creek, Kentucky, USA; former name of the city of Independence and the watercourse Cruises Creek
- John Everetts (1873–1956), U.S. Navy sailor
- Everetts barb, a species of fish
- Everetts bulbul, a species of bird

== See also ==
- Everetts Corner, Delaware, USA
- Everett (disambiguation)
