= Everetts Historic District =

Historic district in North Carolina, United States

- U.S. National Register of Historic Places
- U.S. Historic district
- Location within North Carolina Location within the United States
- Location: Roughly bounded by Barnhill, Peel, Main, Ayers & James Sts., Everetts, North Carolina
- Coordinates: 35°50′05″N 77°10′15″W
- Area: 50 acres (20 ha)
- Built: c. 1870
- Architectural style: Bungalow/Craftsman, Colonial Revival, Romanesque, Queen Anne
- NRHP reference No.: 14000988
- Added to NRHP: December 2, 2014

Everetts Historic District is a national historic district located at Everetts, Martin County, North Carolina. The district encompasses 84 contributing buildings, 3 contributing sites, and 1 contributing structure in the town of Everetts. They include notable examples of Queen Anne, Colonial Revival, Romanesque, and Bungalow / American Craftsman architecture in buildings dated from the 1870s through the 1950s. Most of the district's extant historic buildings date from the early 1900s and 1910s. Located in the district is the separately listed Everetts Christian Church. Other notable buildings include the Simon Peter and Minerva Jane Everett House (1870s), Peel House (c. 1955), Barnhill's Hardware and Grocery Store (1907), the J. S. Peel Commercial Building (1909), Taylor-Peel House (c. 1918), and the Everetts Community Building (1952).

It was listed on the National Register of Historic Places in 2014.
