= North Carolina Highway 171 =

State highway in North Carolina, US

North Carolina Highway 171

Route information
- Maintained by NCDOT
- Length: 17.2 mi (27.7 km)
- Existed: 1936–present

Major junctions
- South end: US 17 in Old Ford
- US 64 in Jamesville
- North end: US 64 Bus. in Jamesville

Location
- Country: United States
- State: North Carolina
- Counties: Beaufort, Martin

Highway system
- North Carolina Highway System; Interstate; US; State; Scenic
← NC 168	→ NC 172

North Carolina Highway 171 (NC 171) is a primary state highway in the U.S. state of North Carolina. It utilized as a connector route running from US 17 in Old Ford between Washington and Williamston to US 64 Business in Jamesville.

== Route description ==
Starting from US 17, in Old Ford, this two-lane rural highway travels through the farmland of Beaufort and Martin Counties, ending in downtown Jamesville at US 64 Business.

== History ==
Established as a new primary routing in 1936 and has not changed since. However, it had existed previously in the late 1920s to late 1934 from Lenoir to Edgemont; it was replaced by NC 90.

== Junction list ==
County	Location	mi	km	Destinations	Notes
Beaufort	Old Ford	0.0	0.0	US 17 – Washington, Williamston	Southern terminus
Martin	Jamesville	16.9	27.2	US 64 – Williamston, Plymouth	
Martin	Jamesville	17.2	27.7	US 64 Bus. (Main Street) / St. Andrews Street	Northern terminus
1.000 mi = 1.609 km; 1.000 km = 0.621 mi
