= Conoho Creek Historic District =

Historic district in North Carolina, United States

- U.S. National Register of Historic Places
- U.S. Historic district
- Location within North Carolina Location within the United States
- Location: Roughly bounded by Conoho Cr., Salsbury Mill Branch, and 0.5 miles S of NC 142, near Hassell, North Carolina
- Coordinates: 35°54′31″N 77°14′21″W
- Area: 2,800 acres (1,100 ha)
- Built: 1890
- Architectural style: Georgian, Federal, Greek Revival
- NRHP reference No.: 98000230
- Added to NRHP: March 12, 1998

Conoho Creek Historic District is a national historic district located near Hassell, Martin County, North Carolina. The district encompasses 77 contributing buildings, 6 contributing site, 5 contributing structures, and 2 contributing objects in a rural agricultural and woodland area of Martin County. They include notable examples of Federal, Georgian, and Greek Revival architecture in buildings dated from the early-19th century through the 1940s. Notable contributing resources include the Outterbridge-Everett Farm, Outterbridge-Briley-Purvis house, the Sherrod-Best-Fleming Farm, the Ballard-Hyman-Thomas Farm, the Ballard-Salsbury-Eubanks Farm, the Cherry-Council House, and the Haislip House.

It was listed on the National Register of Historic Places in 1998.
