= Joseph Needleman =

Victim of attempted lynching

Joseph Needleman (d. 1986) was a Jewish salesman who was falsely accused of rape and castrated in an attempted lynching in Williamston, North Carolina in 1925.

Needleman was the son of a poor Jewish immigrant from Russia. He worked as a traveling salesman.

== Attempted lynching ==
Needleman was falsely accused of raping Effie Griffin, a 19-year-old white Christian woman from a prominent North Carolina family. A mob, including members of the girl's family, broke into the Martin County jail on April 2, 1925 and kidnapped him. The leader of the mob castrated Needleman with a knife. Needleman survived the attack, was absolved by a grand jury, and later sued the family in federal court.

The attack took place behind Skewarkey Primitive Baptist Church, possibly in the church cemetery.

== Legal action ==
Eighteen of his attackers were later convicted, pleaded guilty, or pleaded no contest, of whom 10 received prison sentences. A 19th participant, Tommy Lilley, who lent his .22 caliber rifle to the mob, but did not directly participate in the lynching, shot himself in the head with his rifle after learning about the mass arrests. He died from injuries less than a year later.

At the trial, prosecution witness John Gurkin identified Dennis Griffin as the ringleader and Furnie Sparrow Sr., Julian Bullock, and Furnie Sparrow Jr., as the men who restrained Needleman while Griffin performed the castration. He said that several of the men had intended to lynch Needleman and dump his body in the Roanoke River. Gurkin, however, claimed that he persuaded the men to spare Needleman's life.

The jury convicted Griffin, Sparrow, Sr., and Bullock of mutilation with malice and Baptist minister Claro Heath of mutilation with malice. The remaining defendants including Edward Stone, Johnny Gurkin, Albert Gurkin, Alfred Griffin, Furnie Sparrow Jr., and Roy Gray, all pleaded guilty to being accessories to mutilation. Griffin was sentenced to 30 years in prison at hard labor, while Sparrow Sr., Sparrow Jr., and Bullock were each sentenced to 6 to 10 years in prison at hard labor. Edward Stone and Claro Heath were each sentenced to 2 to 3 years in prison at hard labor. Johnnie Gurkin was sentenced to 18 months to 3 years in prison at hard labor. Roy Gray and Alfred Griffin were both sentenced to 1 to 2 years in prison at hard labor. Albert Gurkin received the same sentence, with an additional $500 fine. The remaining eight defendants, John G. Corey, Lester Edmondson, Tom Harrell, J.H. Coltraine, L.A. Croom, Clarence Gurkin, Hubert Griffin, and Wilson Griffin, were each fined $500. Needleman also filed a $100,000 dollar lawsuit for damages against Sheriff Thad Roberson, Effie Griffin, and the men charged in the assault. In June 1928, the defendants concluded an out-of-court settlement with Needleman.

Denied clemency or a pardon by Governor Angus Wilton McLean Dennis Griffin, Sparrow Sr., and Sparrow Jr. were still in prison 1928. However, Bullock escaped from prison on January 2, 1927, and was never recaptured. Sparrow Jr. was paroled in October 1928. He died in 1976 at the age of 71.

Effie Griffin and Furnie Sparrow Jr., who had gotten married in 1925, separated in 1942 and divorced in 1943. In 1942, Griffin joined the Women's Army Corps. She died in 1984 at the age of 78.

== Later life and death ==
After the trial, Needleman returned to Philadelphia. A year later, he married and became a salesman for a cleaning plant. He died in 1986.
