= Burras House =

Historic house in North Carolina, United States

- U.S. National Register of Historic Places
- Location within North Carolina Location within the United States
- Location: On U.S. 64, Jamesville, North Carolina
- Coordinates: 35°48′33″N 76°54′5″W
- Area: less than one acre
- Architectural style: Federal, vernacular frame cottage
- NRHP reference No.: 78001962
- Added to NRHP: March 30, 1978

Burras House is a historic home located at Jamesville, Martin County, North Carolina. It dates to the early-19th century, and is a 1 1/2-story, five-bay, rectangular vernacular Federal style frame cottage. It has a gable roof and shed roofed front porch with vernacular, Doric order-type porch posts.

It was added to the National Register of Historic Places in 1978.
