= Jamesville Primitive Baptist Church and Cemetery =

Historic site in Martin County, North Carolina, US

- U.S. National Register of Historic Places
- Location within North Carolina Location within the United States
- Location: E side of NC 171, Jamesville, North Carolina
- Coordinates: 35°48′35″N 76°53′51″W
- Area: 0.5 acres (0.20 ha)
- Built: c. 1865-1870
- NRHP reference No.: 84000556
- Added to NRHP: December 20, 1984

Jamesville Primitive Baptist Church and Cemetery, also known as Jamesville Women's Club, is a historic Primitive Baptist church and cemetery located on the east side of NC 171 in Jamesville, Martin County, North Carolina. It was built between 1865 and 1870, and is a rectangular one-story frame building with gable-front roof. It is two-bays wide and three bays deep and is sheathed with plain weatherboards. The Jamesville Women's Club acquired the building and its lot in 1953.

It was added to the National Register of Historic Places in 1984.
