= Bear Grass Primitive Baptist Church =

Historic church in North Carolina, United States

- U.S. National Register of Historic Places
- Location within North Carolina Location within the United States
- Location: NW side NC 1001, 0.1 mi. N of jct with NC 1106, Bear Grass, North Carolina
- Coordinates: 35°46′3″N 77°7′42″W
- Area: 0.5 acres (0.20 ha)
- Built: 1877
- Architectural style: Front-gable
- NRHP reference No.: 05000352
- Added to NRHP: April 28, 2005

Bear Grass Primitive Baptist Church is a historic Primitive Baptist church located on the north side NC 1001, 0.1 miles north of the junction with NC 1106 in Bear Grass, Martin County, North Carolina. It was built in 1877, and is a front-gable, two-bay frame building. The building measures 42 feet, 2 3/4 inches, wide and 64 feet, 4 1/2 inches deep. It rests on a brick pier foundation and it is believed that parts of the earlier building are incorporated into the current edifice.

It was added to the National Register of Historic Places in 2005.
