= Daniel T. Lilley =

American politician (1920–1996)

Member of the North Carolina House of Representatives
- In office 1969–???

Personal details
- Born: August 15, 1920 Martin County, North Carolina, U.S.
- Died: June 1996 (aged 75)
- Party: Democratic
- Spouse: Jean Hites
- Children: 2

Daniel T. Lilley (August 15, 1920 – June 1996) was an American politician. He served as a Democratic member of the North Carolina House of Representatives.

== Life and career ==
Lilley was born in Martin County, North Carolina. He attended Farm Life High School and Spartan School of Aeronautics.

In 1969, Lilley was elected to the North Carolina House of Representatives.

Lilley died in June 1996, at the age of 75.
