= KMCZ =

KMCZ may refer to:

- Martin County Airport (ICAO code KMCZ)
- KMCZ (FM), a defunct radio station (107.1 FM) formerly licensed to serve Cameron, Louisiana, United States
