= MCZ =

MCZ may refer to:

- Marine Conservation Zone, type of marine nature reserve in UK waters
- Martin County Airport, North Carolina, USA
- Momoiro Clover Z, Japanese girl group
- Museum of Comparative Zoology, Harvard University, Massachusetts, USA
- Zumbi dos Palmares International Airport, Maceió, Brazil (IATA code)
- The former ticker symbol for Mad Catz
