= Bear Grass School =

Historic Charter school in North Carolina, United States

- U.S. National Register of Historic Places
- U.S. Historic district
- Location within North Carolina Location within the United States
- Location: 6344 E. Bear Grass Rd., Bear Grass, North Carolina
- Coordinates: 35°46′05″N 77°07′38″W
- Area: 9 acres (3.6 ha)
- Built: 1925
- Architect: Flanagan, Eric
- Architectural style: Colonial Revival, Modern Movement
- NRHP reference No.: 05000515
- Added to NRHP: June 1, 2005

Bear Grass School is a historic school complex and national historic district located at Bear Grass, Martin County, North Carolina. The complex includes the one-story Colonial Revival style brick school (1925), a utility shed, a frame gymnasium (1942), a brick cafeteria and high school building (1948), a brick gymnasium (1955), a brick principal's residence (1955), a frame "scout hut" (1951), and a frame teacherage (1935).

It was listed on the National Register of Historic Places in 2004.
