= Asa Biggs House and Site =

Historic house in North Carolina, United States

- U.S. National Register of Historic Places
- U.S. Historic district – Contributing property
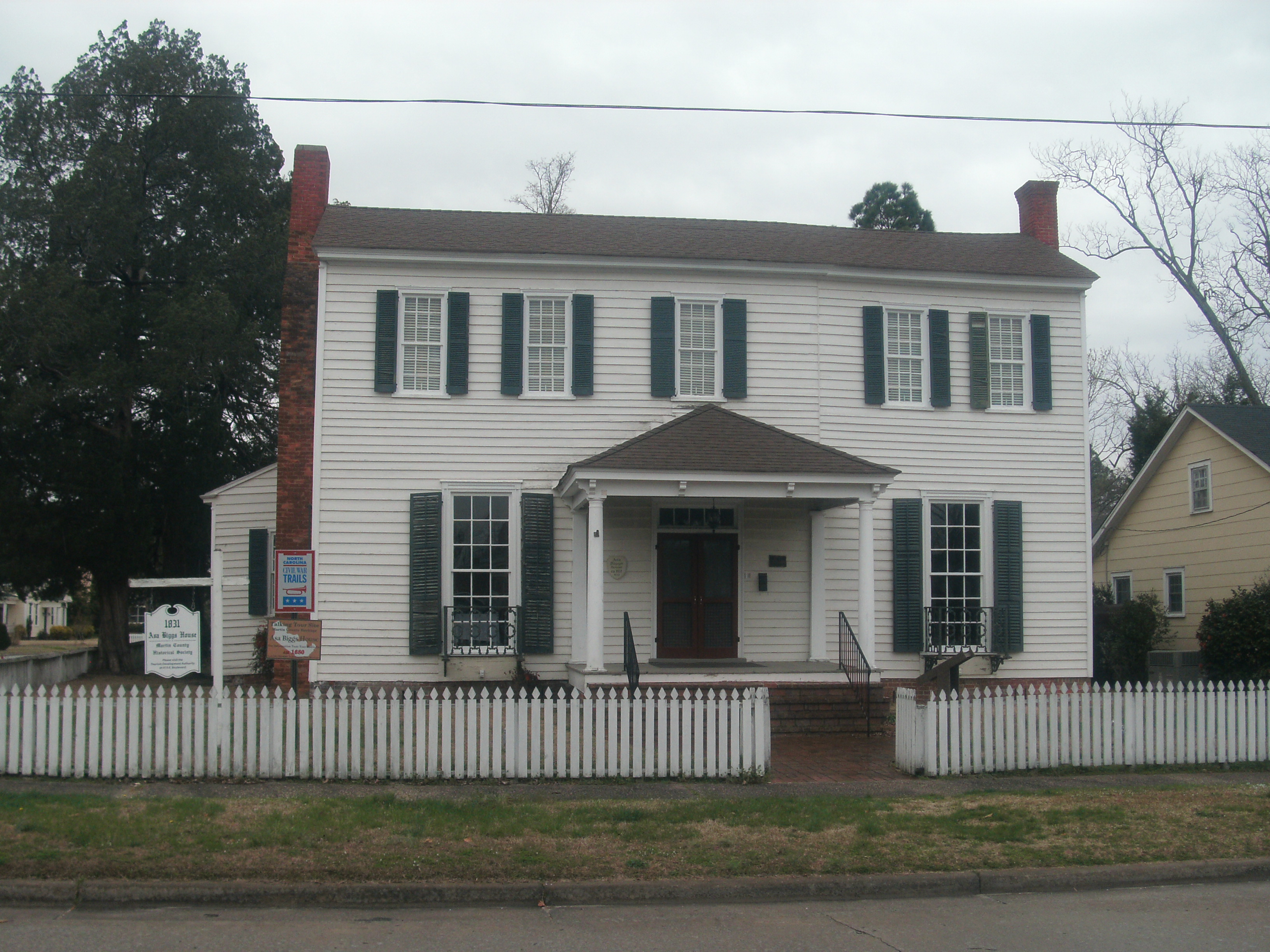
- The Asa Biggs House, March, 2015

- Location within North Carolina Location within the United States
- Location: 100 E. Church St., Williamston, North Carolina
- Coordinates: 35°51′22″N 77°3′24″W
- Area: 0.3 acres (0.12 ha)
- Built: 1835
- Architectural style: Greek Revival, Federal, vernacular
- NRHP reference No.: 79003335
- Added to NRHP: October 10, 1979

The Asa Biggs House and Site is a historic home and archaeological site located at Williamston, Martin County, North Carolina. It was built in 1835, and built as a two-story, side hall-plan, late Federal style frame dwelling. It was later enlarged with a two-story, two-bay, vernacular Greek Revival style addition and rear ell to form a T plan. It was the home of U.S. Congressman, Senator, and judge Asa Biggs (1811-1878). The property is owned by the Martin County Historical Society.

It was added to the National Register of Historic Places in 1979. It is located in the Williamston Historic District.
