= Hickory Hills =

Hickory Hills may refer to several places in the United States:

- Hickory Hills, Alabama - two locations:
  - Hickory Hills, Lauderdale County, Alabama
  - Hickory Hills, Morgan County, Alabama
- Hickory Hills, Georgia
- Hickory Hills, Illinois - two locations:
  - Hickory Hills, Illinois, in Cook County
  - Hickory Hills, Henry County, Illinois
- Hickory Hills, Maryland - three locations:
  - Hickory Hills, Anne Arundel County, Maryland
  - Hickory Hills, Calvert County, Maryland
  - Hickory Hills, Harford County, Maryland
- Hickory Hills, Mississippi
- Hickory Hills, North Carolina
- Hickory Hills, Ohio - two locations:
  - Hickory Hills, Athens County, Ohio
  - Hickory Hills, Williams County, Ohio
- Hickory Hills, Pennsylvania
- Hickory Hills, Tennessee - six locations:
  - Hickory Hills, Bradley County, Tennessee
  - Hickory Hills, Greene County, Tennessee
  - Hickory Hills, Hamilton County, Tennessee
  - Hickory Hills, Knox County, Tennessee
  - Hickory Hills, Rutherford County, Tennessee
  - Hickory Hills, Williamson County, Tennessee
- Hickory Hill, West Virginia
- Hickory Hills, Wisconsin

== See also ==
- Hickory Hill (disambiguation)
