= Hamilton Historic District (Hamilton, North Carolina) =

Historic district in North Carolina, United States

- U.S. National Register of Historic Places
- U.S. Historic district
- Location within North Carolina Location within the United States
- Location: NC 125, Hamilton, North Carolina
- Coordinates: 35°56′41″N 77°12′31″W
- Area: 200 acres (81 ha)
- Architectural style: Greek Revival, Queen Anne, Carpenter Gothic
- NRHP reference No.: 80002884
- Added to NRHP: June 3, 1980

Hamilton Historic District is a national historic district located at Hamilton, Martin County, North Carolina. The district encompasses 60 contributing buildings, 2 contributing sites, and 1 contributing structure in the town of Hamilton. They include notable examples of Greek Revival, Queen Anne, and Carpenter Gothic architecture in buildings dated from the early-19th century through the 1920s. Located in the district is the separately listed Darden Hotel. Other notable buildings include the Edmondson-Purvis House, Upton-Pippen house, Conoho Masonic Lodge, Weatherbee-Anthony House, David L. Martin House (c. 1879), Baker-Ballard House, St. Martin's Episcopal Church, Gladstone Building, Hamilton Methodist Church (1903), and Hamilton Baptist Church (1929).

It was listed on the National Register of Historic Places in 1980.
