= Everetts Church of Christ =

Historic church in North Carolina, United States

- Everetts Christian Church
- U.S. National Register of Historic Places
- Location within North Carolina Location within the United States
- Location: 109 S. Broad St., Everetts, North Carolina
- Coordinates: 35°49′59″N 77°10′14″W
- Area: 0.2 acres (0.081 ha)
- Built: 1923
- Architectural style: Romanesque
- NRHP reference No.: 05000351
- Added to NRHP: April 28, 2005

Everetts Church of Christ, also known as Everetts Christian Church, is a historic Disciples of Christ (DOC) church located at 109 S. Broad Street in Everetts, Martin County, North Carolina. It was built in 1923, and is a one-story, brick-veneered, Romanesque Revival building. The front facade features three arched stained-glass windows and a two-story bell tower.

It was added to the National Register of Historic Places in 2005.

The senior pastor is Rev. Dr. Tony Warren, author of the devotional book, Footsteps of Recovery The mailing address is Everetts Christian Church, PO Box 245, Everetts, NC 27828.
