= Williamston Commercial Historic District =

Historic district in North Carolina, United States

- U.S. National Register of Historic Places
- U.S. Historic district
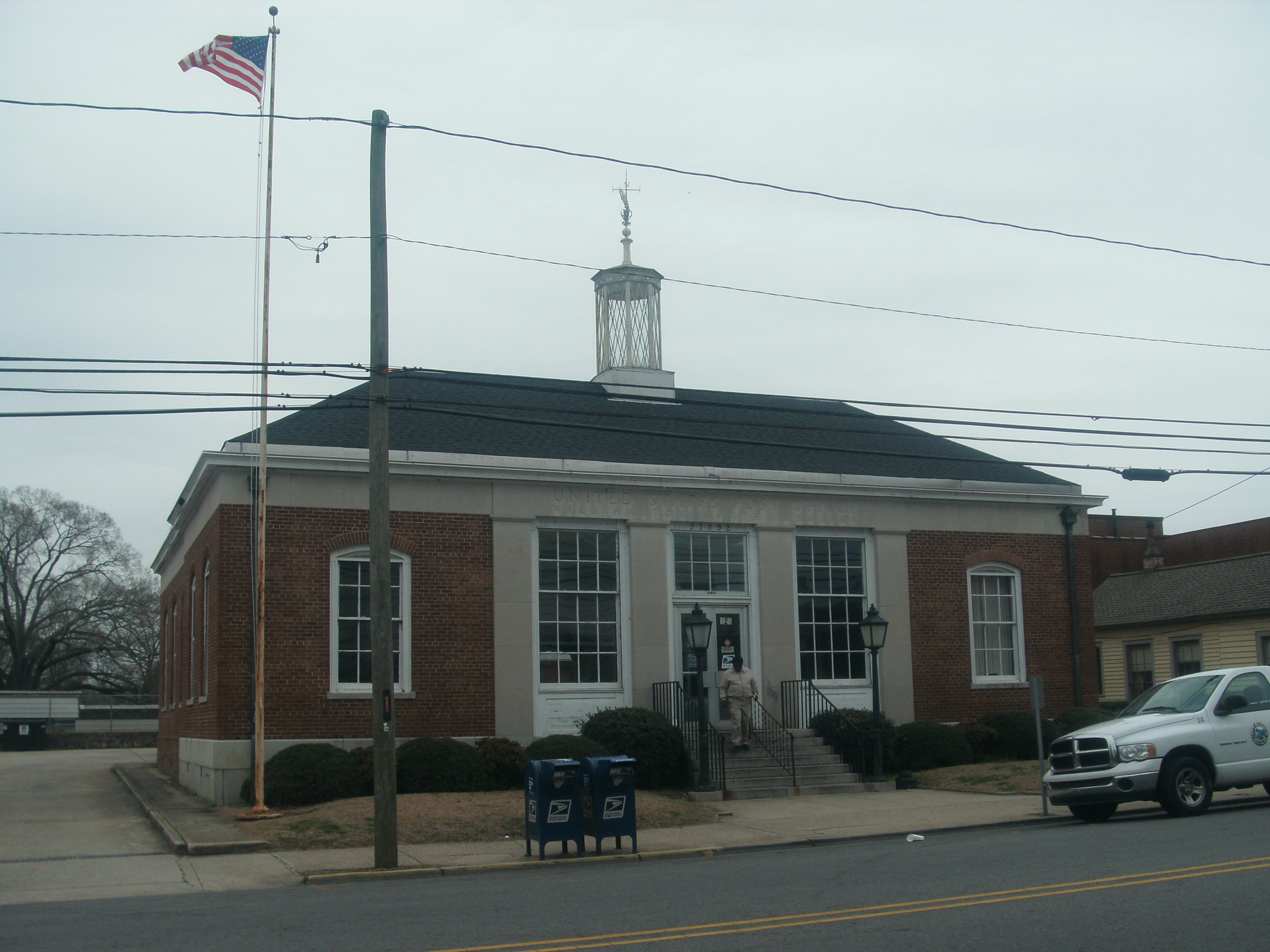
- US Post Office, March, 2015

- Location within North Carolina Location within the United States
- Location: Roughly, areas surrounding the 100 blocks of E. Main, W. Main and S. Smithwick Sts. and the 200 block of Washington St., Williamston, North Carolina
- Coordinates: 35°51′17″N 77°03′21″W
- Area: 11.5 acres (4.7 ha)
- Built: 1850
- Architect: Benton, Charles Collins; Bishop, Fred A., et al.
- Architectural style: Greek Revival, Colonial Revival, Romanesque
- NRHP reference No.: 95000174
- Added to NRHP: March 9, 1995

Williamston Commercial Historic District is a national historic district located at Williamston, Martin County, North Carolina. The district encompasses 31 contributing buildings in the central business district of Williamston. They include notable examples of Greek Revival, Colonial Revival, and Romanesque architecture in buildings dated from the mid-19th century through the 1920s. Located in the district is the separately listed Martin County Courthouse. Other notable buildings include the Docton W. Bagley Building (c. 1850), (former) People's Bank (1917), Watts Theatre (1929/1940/c. 1968), the Tar Heel Apartments (1921), the Flatiron Building, and the United States Post Office (1938). The post office contains a mural, First Flight of the Wright Brothers at Kitty Hawk, by Philip von Saltza, painted in 1940 as part of the Works Project Administration's mural project.

It was listed on the National Register of Historic Places in 1995.
