= Williamston Colored School =

Historic school building in North Carolina, United States

- U.S. National Register of Historic Places
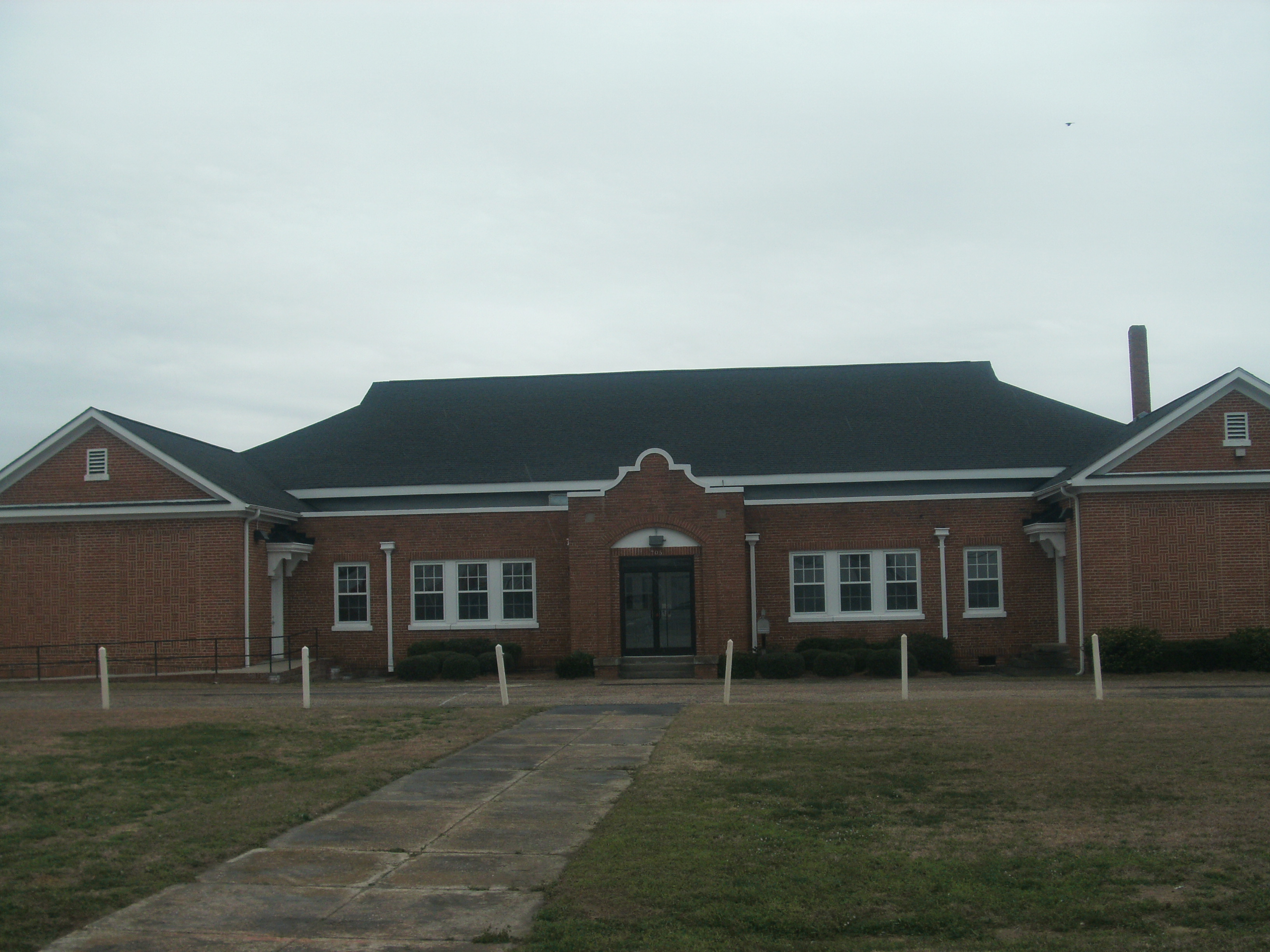
- Williamston Colored School in March, 2015

- Location within North Carolina Location within the United States
- Location: 705 Washington St., Williamston, North Carolina
- Coordinates: 35°50′45″N 77°03′38″W
- Area: 2.8 acres (1.1 ha)
- Built: 1930-1931
- Architect: Flannagan, Eric G.
- Architectural style: Colonial Revival
- NRHP reference No.: 14000445
- Added to NRHP: July 25, 2014

Williamston Colored School, also known as E. J. Hayes School and E. J. Hayes High School, is a historic Rosenwald School building located at Williamston, Martin County, North Carolina, USA. It was built between 1930 and 1931 and is a one-story, five-bay, H-shaped, Colonial Revival-style red brick building. It has two projecting pedimented gable-front wings, a hipped roof, and large decorative brick panels in a basketweave bond. A three classroom addition was built in 1939.

It was listed on the National Register of Historic Places in 2014.
