= Jesse Fuller Jones House =

Historic house in North Carolina, United States

- U.S. National Register of Historic Places
- Location within North Carolina Location within the United States
- Location: Off SR 1409, Spring Green, North Carolina
- Coordinates: 35°53′2″N 77°11′8″W
- Area: less than one acre
- Built: 1800-1825
- Architectural style: Federal
- NRHP reference No.: 82003485
- Added to NRHP: April 29, 1982

Jesse Fuller Jones House is a historic plantation house in Spring Green, Martin County, North Carolina. It dates to the first quarter of the 19th century and is a 2 1/2-story, four-bay, Federal-style frame dwelling. It has a gable roof and flanking exterior end chimneys. The house features handsomely detailed interior woodwork. Also on the property is a contributing smokehouse.

It was added to the National Register of Historic Places in 1982.
