= W. J. Little House =

Historic house in North Carolina, United States

- U.S. National Register of Historic Places
- Location within North Carolina Location within the United States
- Location: 109 N. Main St., Robersonville, North Carolina
- Coordinates: 35°49′30″N 77°15′16″W
- Area: 1 acre (0.40 ha)
- Built: 1913–1914; 112 years ago
- Architects: Stout, John C.
- Architectural style: Classical Revival
- NRHP reference No.: 85002420
- Added to NRHP: September 19, 1985

W. J. Little House, also known as the “Little House” or “Magnolia Hall,” is a historic home located at Robersonville, Martin County, North Carolina. It was built in 1913–1914, and is a two-story, three-bay, double-pile Classical Revival style frame dwelling. It has a hipped slate roof topped by a Chippendale-style balustrade, a two-story entrance portico, a one-story wrap-around porch, and a porte-cochère.

The house was used as a central filming location for the 1987 film, Summer Heat (1987 film).

It was added to the National Register of Historic Places in 1985.
