= Williamston Historic District =

Historic district in North Carolina, United States

- U.S. National Register of Historic Places
- U.S. Historic district
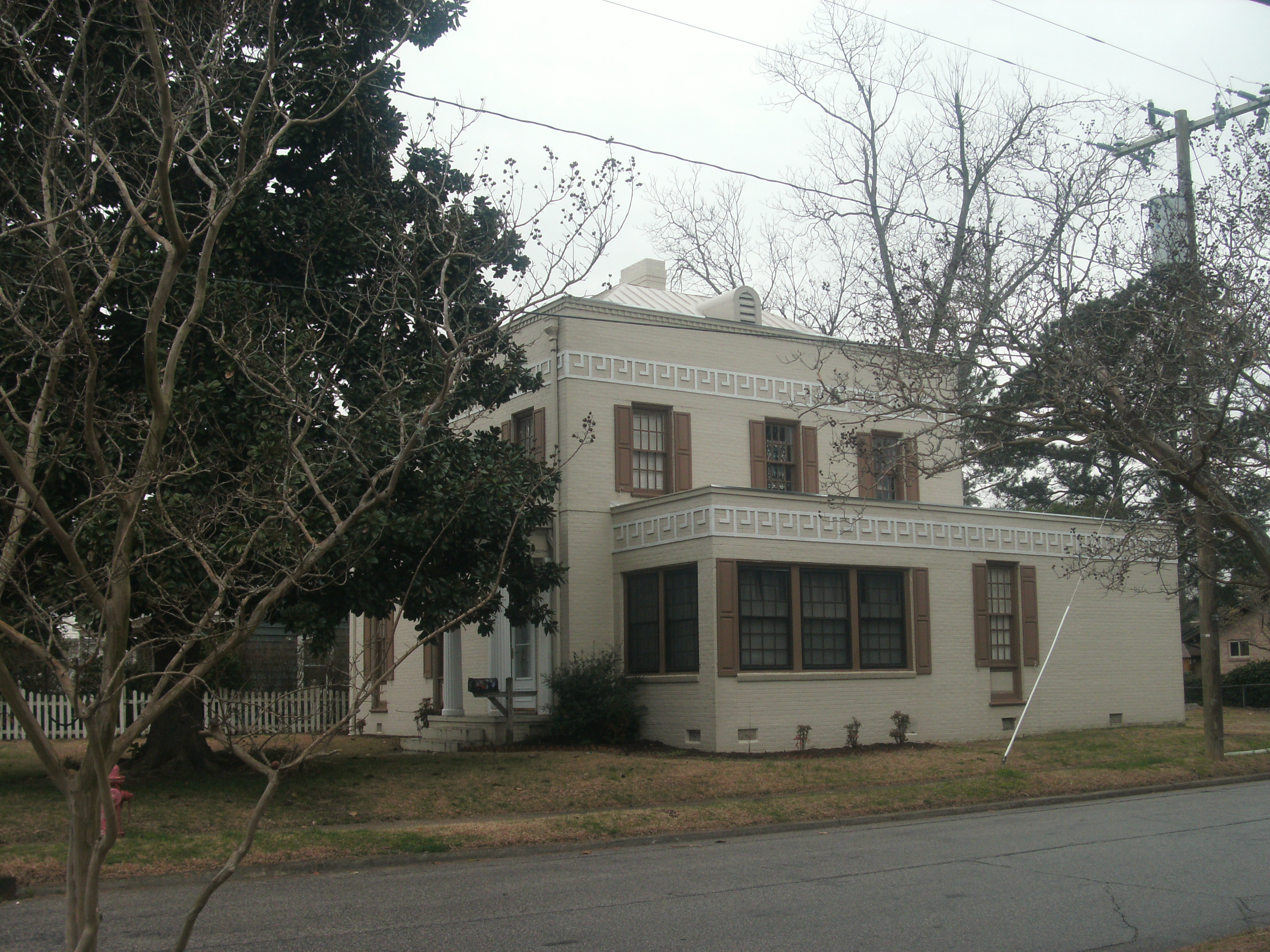
- The Frank Earl Wynne House in March, 2015

- Location within North Carolina Location within the United States
- Location: Roughly bounded by Franklin, Harrell, Williams, South Haughton, North Railroad, Roberson, and White Sts., Williamston, North Carolina
- Coordinates: 35°51′14″N 77°03′22″W
- Area: 145 acres (59 ha)
- Built: c. 1800
- Architect: Benton, Charles C.; Benton, Frank W.
- Architectural style: Federal, Late Gothic Revival, Colonial Revival et.al.
- NRHP reference No.: 01001095
- Added to NRHP: October 12, 2001

Williamston Historic District is a national historic district located at Williamston, Martin County, North Carolina. The district encompasses 368 contributing buildings, 1 contributing site, and 27 contributing structures in predominantly residential sections of Williamston. They include notable examples of Federal, Late Gothic Revival, and Colonial Revival architecture in buildings dated from the early-19th century through the 1940s. Located in the district is the separately listed Asa Biggs House and Site. Other notable buildings include the Williams-Knight House (c. 1800), Duggan-Godard House (1853–1854), Cushing Biggs Hassell House (1847–1848), James Daniel Leggett House (1907), Stalls-Lee House (1925), J. R. Leggett House (1927), and Frank N. Margolis House (1929).

It was listed on the National Register of Historic Places in 2001.
