= Oak City Christian Church =

Historic church in North Carolina, United States

- U.S. National Register of Historic Places
- Location within North Carolina Location within the United States
- Location: 310 W. Commerce St., Oak City, North Carolina
- Coordinates: 35°57′37″N 77°18′53″W
- Area: less than one acre
- Built: 1921
- Architectural style: Gothic Revival
- NRHP reference No.: 05000354
- Added to NRHP: April 28, 2005

Oak City Christian Church, also known as Oak City Christian Church, Disciples of Christ, is a historic Christian Church (Disciples of Christ) (DOC) church located at 310 W. Commerce Street in Oak City, Martin County, North Carolina. It was built in 1921, and is a one-story, frame, weatherboarded, Gothic Revival style building. It features five lancet-arched stained-glass windows, a two-story bell tower with a broached hexagonal roof, and a hip-roofed porch.

It was added to the National Register of Historic Places in 2005.
