= Skewarkey Primitive Baptist Church =

Historic church in North Carolina, United States

- U.S. National Register of Historic Places
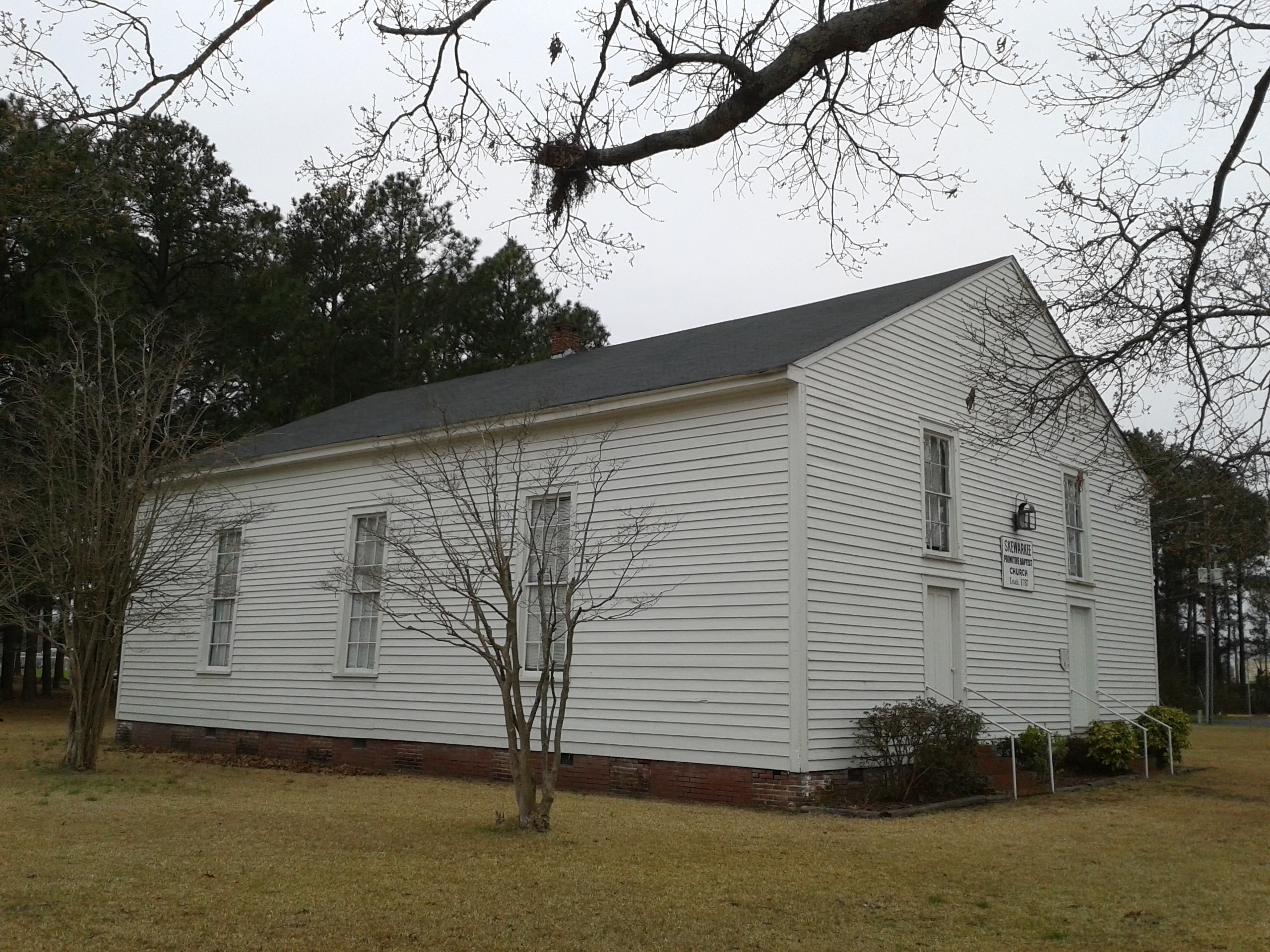
- Skewarkey Primitive Baptist Church seen in March, 2015

- Location within North Carolina Location within the United States
- Location: W side of US 17, 0.04 miles S. of jct. with US 64, near Williamston, North Carolina
- Coordinates: 35°50′25″N 77°3′54″W
- Area: 4.9 acres (2.0 ha)
- Built: 1858-1859
- Architectural style: Greek Revival, Front-gable
- NRHP reference No.: 05000355
- Added to NRHP: April 28, 2005

Skewarkey Primitive Baptist Church is a historic Primitive Baptist church located near Williamston, Martin County, North Carolina. It was built in 1858–1859, and is a one-story, front-gable timber-frame building in a simply rendered Greek Revival style. The building measures just over 60 feet deep and 40 feet wide. Located on the property is the contributing church cemetery. A historic marker denoting the history of the church was erected in 1959 by the state of North Carolina.

Joseph Needleman was attacked and castrated in the area just behind the church in 1925; the location of the attack is sometimes given as the church cemetery.

It was added to the National Register of Historic Places in 2005.
