= W. W. Griffin Farm =

Historic farm in North Carolina, United States

- U.S. National Register of Historic Places
- Location within North Carolina Location within the United States
- Location: 1871 Wendell Griffin Rd., near Williamston, North Carolina
- Coordinates: 35°49′45″N 76°57′29″W
- Area: 6.8 acres (2.8 ha)
- Built: c. 1902
- Architectural style: I-house
- NRHP reference No.: 01001134
- Added to NRHP: October 20, 2001

W. W. Griffin Farm is a historic home and farm located near Williamston, Martin County, North Carolina. The house was built about 1902, and built as a two-story, three-bay, frame, I-house. It is sheathed in weatherboard siding and rests on a brick pier foundation. The house has a stylish front porch, one-story rear ell, and an additional room added about 1930. Also on the property is the contributing storage shed (c. 1920), corn crib (c. 1900), cotton barn (c. 1910), hay barn (c. 1940), brick well (c. 1930), and agricultural landscape.

It was added to the National Register of Historic Places in 2001.
