= Fort Branch Site =

- U.S. National Register of Historic Places
- Location within North Carolina Location within the United States
- Location: SE of Hamilton on SR 1416, near Hamilton, North Carolina
- Coordinates: 35°55′39″N 77°10′19″W
- Area: 9 acres (3.6 ha)
- Built: c. 1863
- NRHP reference No.: 73001358
- Added to NRHP: June 18, 1973

Fort Branch Site is a historic archaeological site located near Hamilton, Martin County, North Carolina. Fort Branch was built in 1862 and improved in mid- to late 1864. It sits 70 feet above a bend in the Roanoke River, and the Confederate States Army earthen fort provided a safe and clear view of Union gunboats approaching from down river. The fort site has undergone restoration by the Fort Branch Battlefield Commission, Inc.

It was listed on the National Register of Historic Places in 1973.
