= Sherrod Farm =

Historic house in North Carolina, United States

- U.S. National Register of Historic Places
- Location within North Carolina Location within the United States
- Location: W side of NC 125/903, near Hamilton, North Carolina
- Coordinates: 35°55′31″N 77°12′30″W
- Area: 140 acres (57 ha)
- Architectural style: Greek Revival, Federal, Greek Revival Vernacular
- NRHP reference No.: 84000552
- Added to NRHP: December 20, 1984

Sherrod Farm is a historic plantation house located near Hamilton, Martin County, North Carolina. The main part of the L-shaped dwelling is a two-story, five-bay, single-pile, Federal style center-hall plan frame dwelling dated to the first quarter of the 19th century. The one-story pedimented Ionic order portico was added about 1843 and is in a vernacular Greek Revival style. The two-bay one-story Georgian rear ell was raised to two stories in the late-19th century.

It was added to the National Register of Historic Places in 1984.
