= Darden Hotel (Hamilton, North Carolina) =

- U.S. National Register of Historic Places
- Location within North Carolina Location within the United States
- Location: Main St., Hamilton, North Carolina
- Coordinates: 35°56′33″N 77°12′32″W
- Area: less than one acre
- Built: c. 1843
- Architectural style: Greek Revival, frame temple-form building
- NRHP reference No.: 75001280
- Added to NRHP: December 30, 1975

Darden Hotel, also known as Conoho House and Hamilton House, is a historic hotel building located at Hamilton, Martin County, North Carolina. It was built about 1843, and is a two-story, three bay by four bay, temple form frame building in the Greek Revival style. It features a superimposed vernacular Ionic order double portico.

It was listed on the National Register of Historic Places in 1975.
