= Hickory Hill (Hamilton, North Carolina) =

Historic house in North Carolina, United States

- U.S. National Register of Historic Places
- Location within North Carolina Location within the United States
- Location: NC 903, near Hamilton, North Carolina
- Coordinates: 35°56′59″N 77°13′14″W
- Area: 208.6 acres (84.4 ha)
- Built: c. 1847
- Architectural style: Colonial Revival, Greek Revival, Late Victorian
- NRHP reference No.: 84000546
- Added to NRHP: December 20, 1984

Hickory Hill, also known as the Price-Everett House, is a historic home located near Hamilton, Martin County, North Carolina. The original Greek Revival style section was built about 1847, and is a two-story double-pile, frame building with a center-hall plan. It is three bays by two bays, and has a low hipped roof and two interior chimneys with stuccoed stacks. The present one-story, hipped roof, full-facade Victorian porch was added in the 1880s. The house was considerably refurbished in the Colonial Revival style during the early-20th century.

It was added to the National Register of Historic Places in 1984.
