= Hamilton Historic Civic Center =

Coordinates: 39°24′04″N 84°33′53″W

- U.S. National Register of Historic Places
- U.S. Historic district
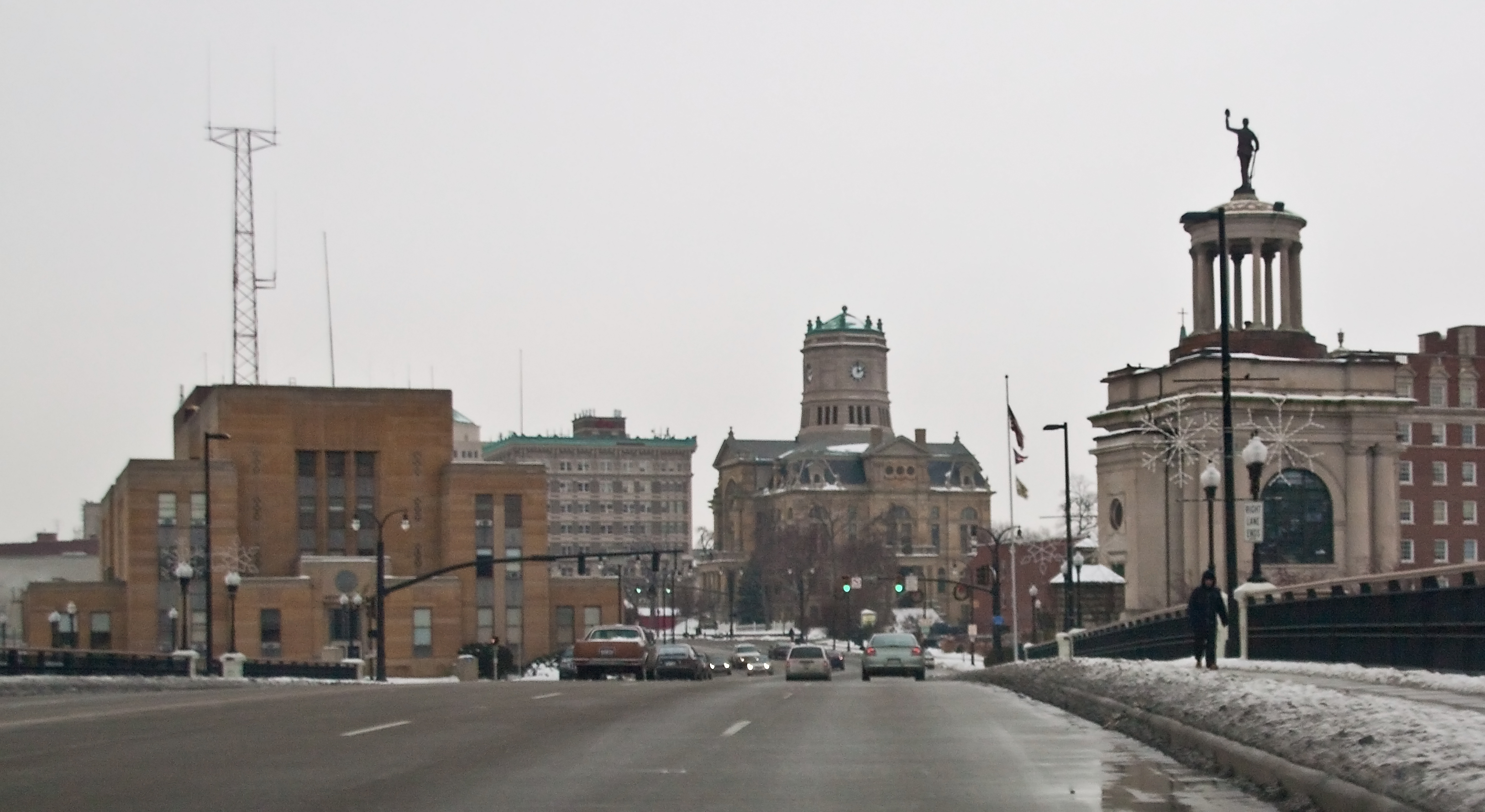

- Location within Ohio Location within the United States
- Location: Hamilton, Ohio
- Area: 40 acres (160,000 m^{2})
- Architectural style: Classical Revival, Moderne and Art Deco
- NRHP reference No.: 94000170
- Added to NRHP: 1995-06-29

Hamilton Historic Civic Center is a registered historic district in Hamilton, Ohio, listed in the National Register of Historic Places on 1995-06-29. It contains 4 contributing buildings.

Included buildings are the Anthony Wayne Hotel (now senior housing), the 1935 Hamilton Municipal Building(now The Hamilton Mill business incubator and Heritage Hall), the Soldier's, Sailor's and Pioneer's Monument, and the High-Main Bridge (now replaced).

== Gallery ==
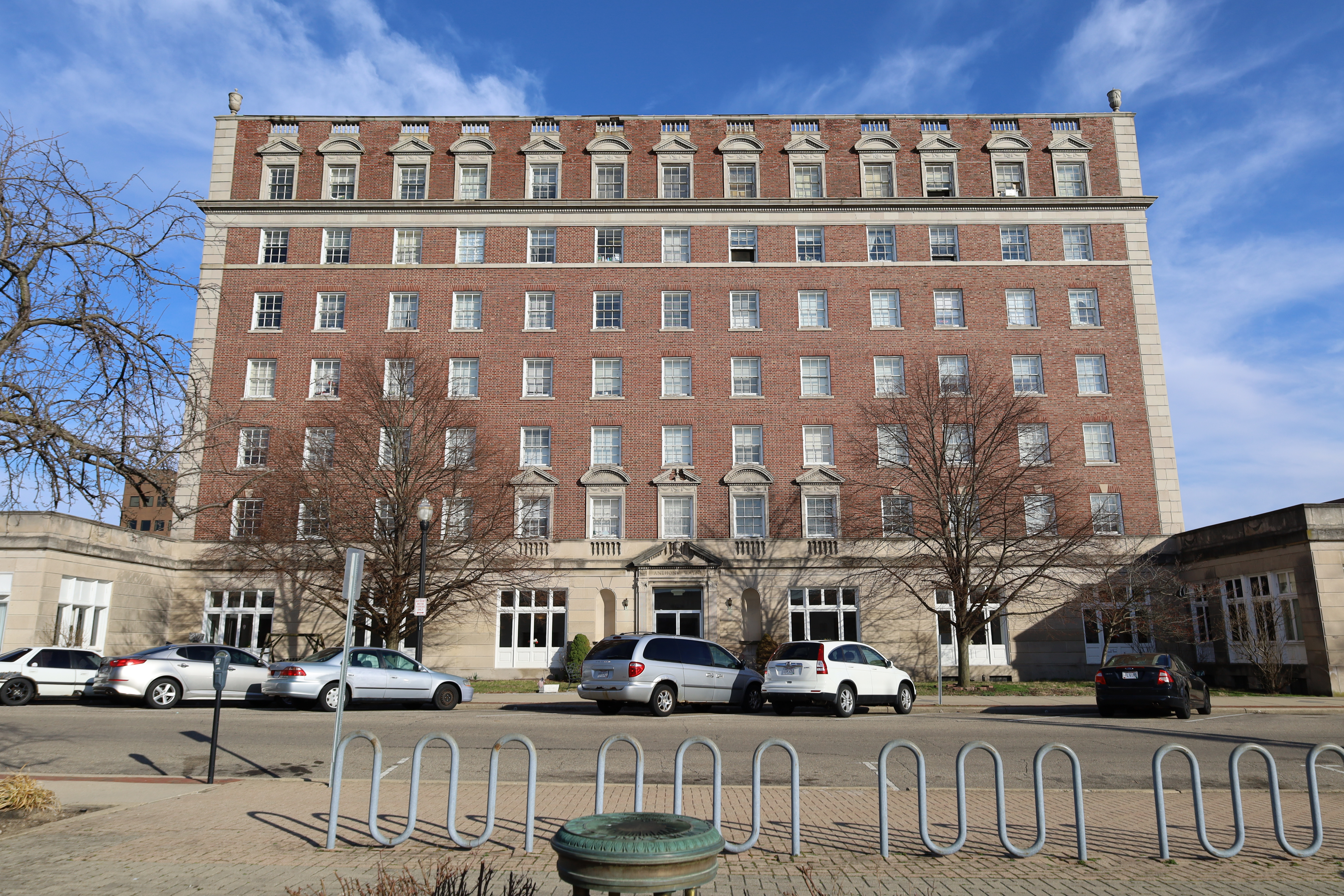
Anthony Wayne Hotel in 2022

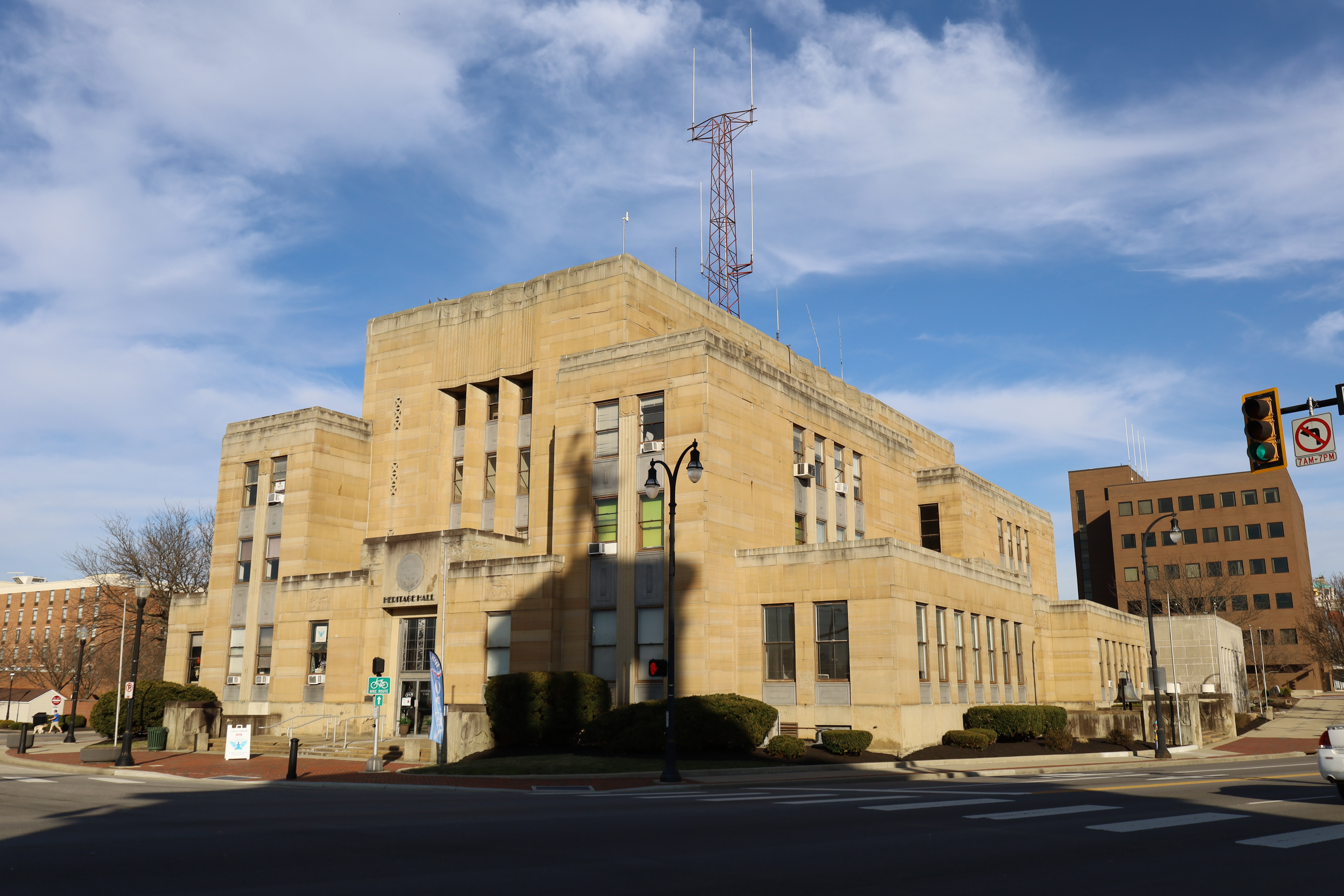
Heritage Hall in 2022

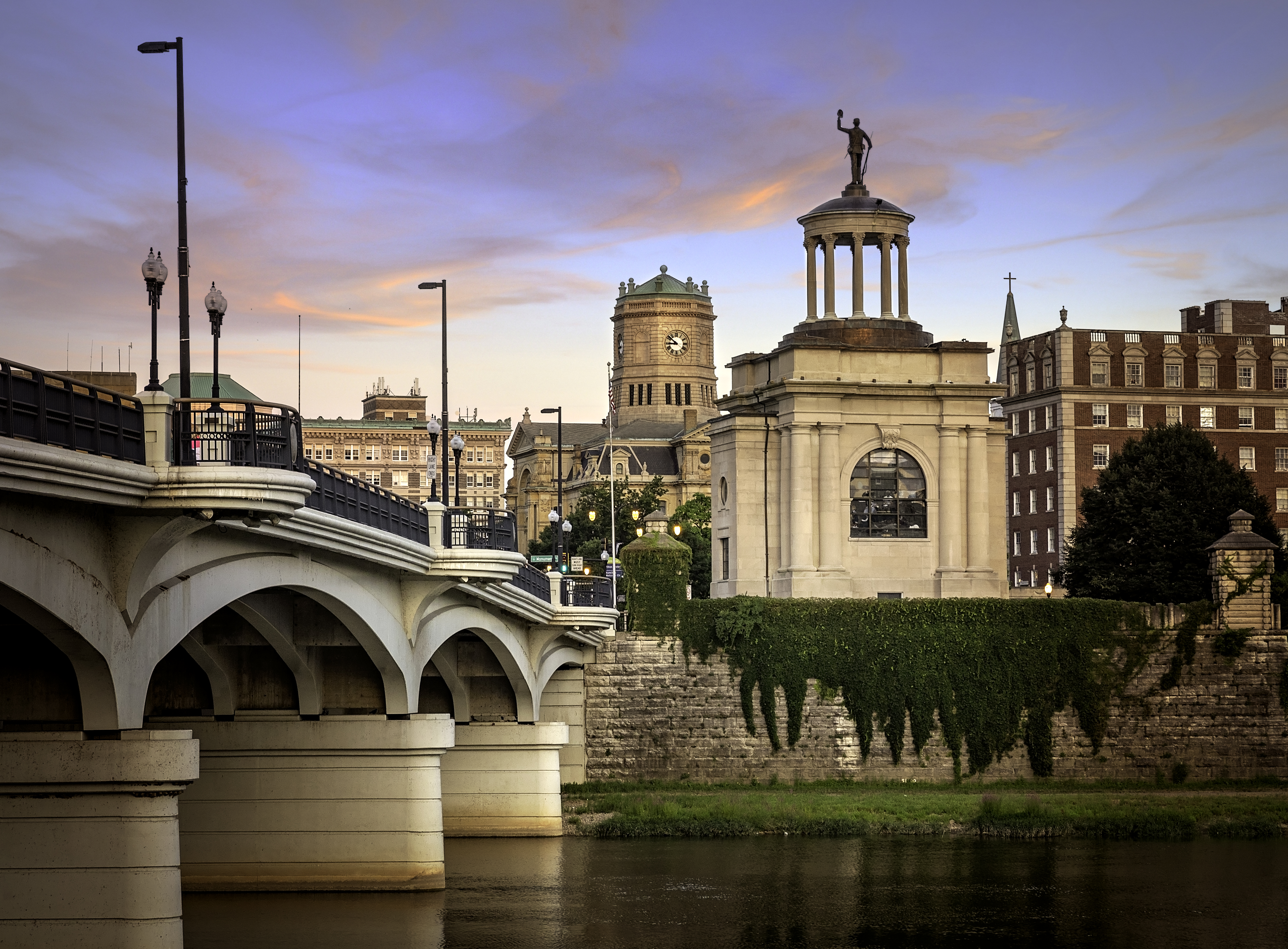
The Soldier's, Sailor's and Pioneer's Monument at right in 2018

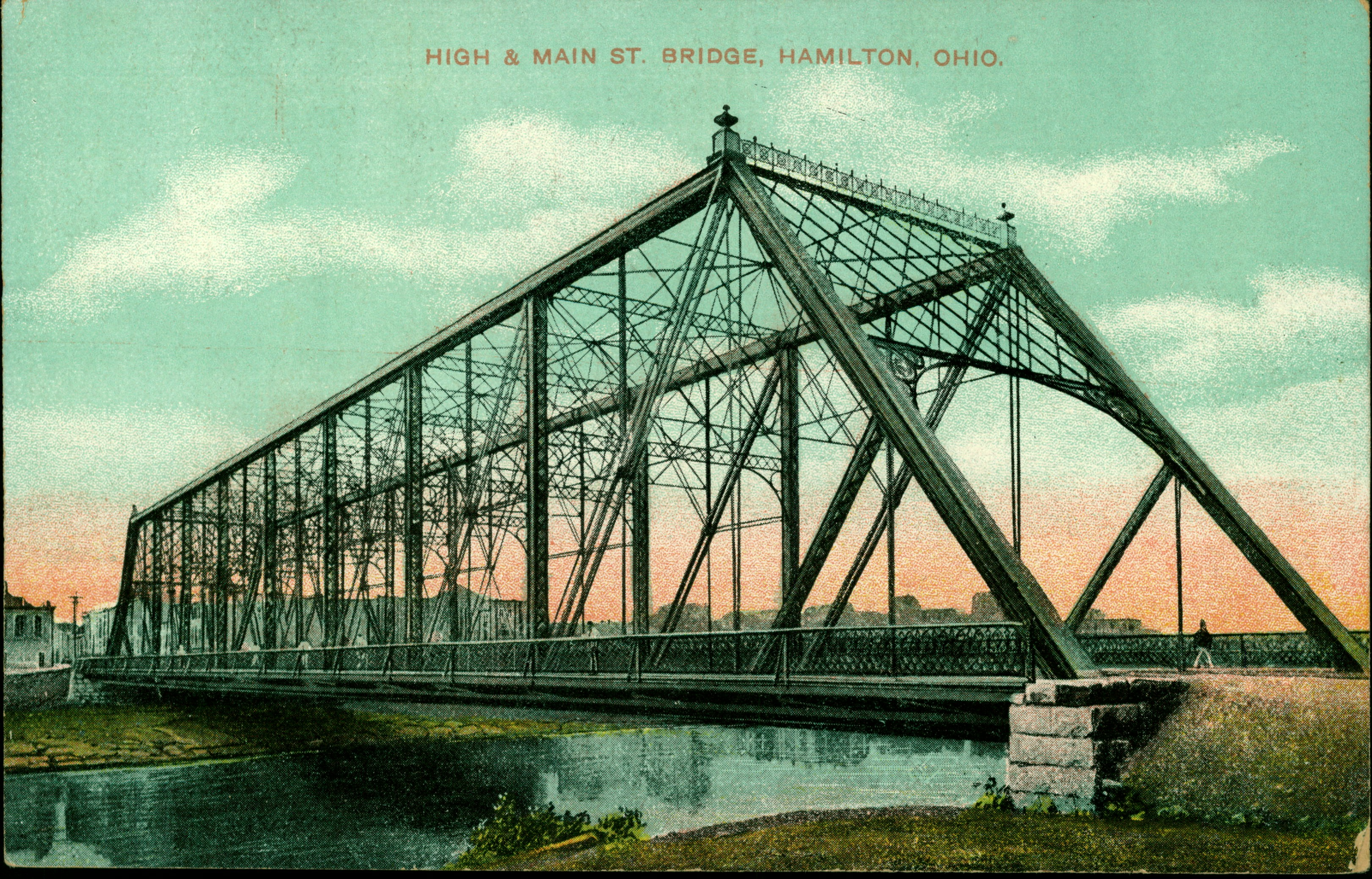
The former High & Main Street Bridge
