= Hamilton Historic District (Carnesville, Georgia) =

Historic district in Georgia, United States

- U.S. National Register of Historic Places
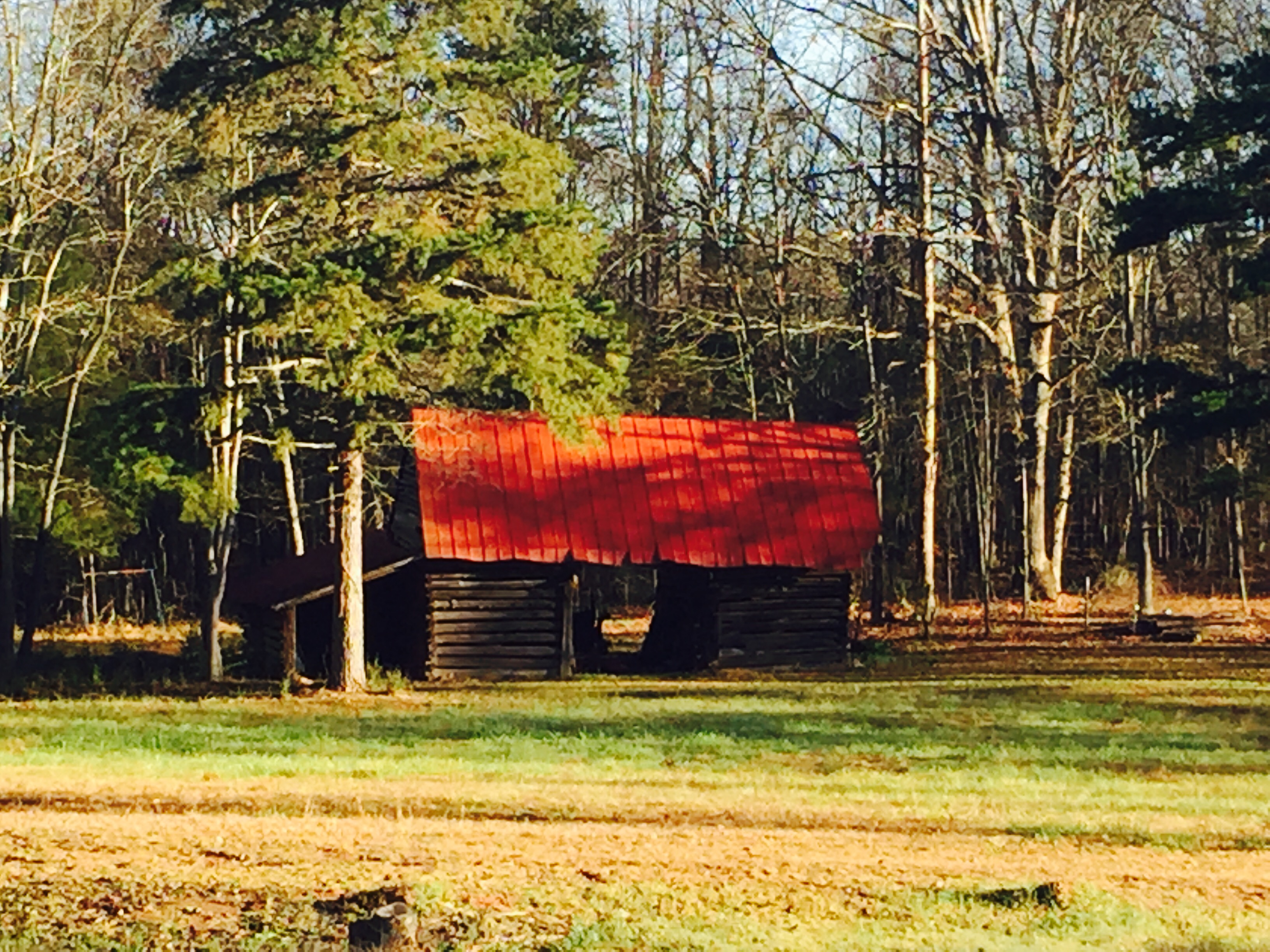

- Location within Georgia
- Nearest city: Carnesville, Georgia
- Coordinates: 34°20′54″N 83°19′49″W
- Area: 25 acres (10 ha)
- Built: c.1860
- Architectural style: Bungalow/craftsman, plantation plain
- MPS: Old Federal Road in Georgia's Banks and Franklin Counties MPS
- NRHP reference No.: 96001300
- Added to NRHP: November 7, 1996

The Hamilton Historic District, in Franklin County, Georgia near Carnesville, Georgia is located on GA 51, approximately .5 mi. NW of jct. with I-85. It is a 25 acres (10 ha) historic district which was listed on the National Register of Historic Places in 1996. The listing included 13 contributing buildings and three non-contributing ones.

One of the two oldest homes is the Brawner-Kennedy-Hamilton House, built in the 1850s or 1860s. It is a Plantation Plain-style house with a rear kitchen extension. It was home of medical Dr. Asa W. Brawner (b.1830), who served as Franklin County's representative to the state General Assembly during the American Civil War. He was also in the Georgia State Guard "and was assigned to stay in the area and care for residents and the many young soldiers returning from the war."
