= Martin County Courthouse (North Carolina) =

Historic courthouse in North Carolina, US

- U.S. National Register of Historic Places
- U.S. Historic district – Contributing property
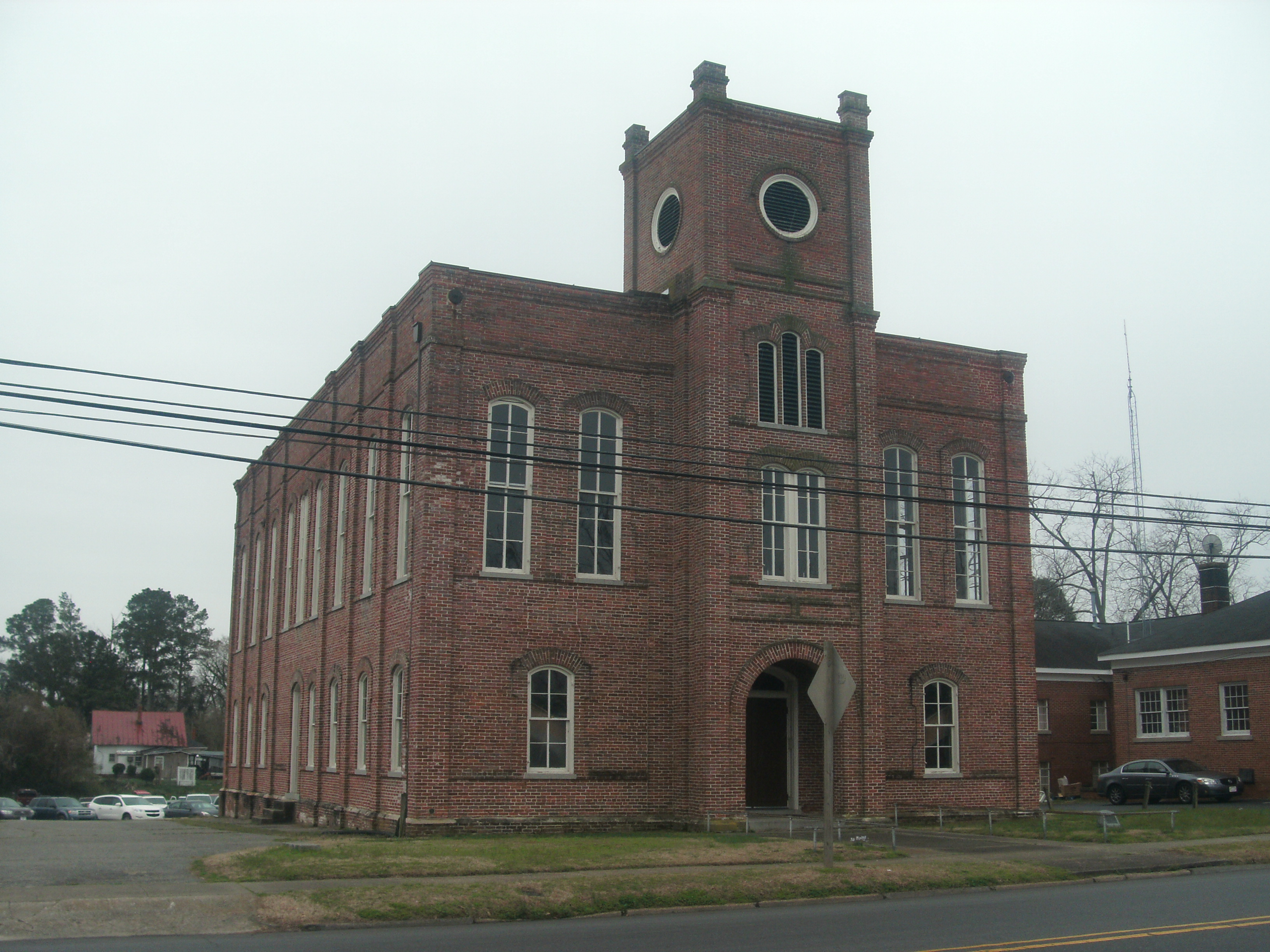
- The old Martin County Courthouse building, seen in March, 2015

- Location within North Carolina Location within the United States
- Location: Main St., Williamston, North Carolina
- Coordinates: 35°51′54″N 77°3′10″W
- Area: less than one acre
- Built: 1885
- Architectural style: Late Victorian, Italianate
- Website: https://oldcourthouseculturalcenter.com/
- MPS: North Carolina County Courthouses TR
- NRHP reference No.: 79001733
- Added to NRHP: May 10, 1979

Martin County Courthouse is a historic courthouse building located at Williamston, Martin County, North Carolina. It was built in 1885, and is two-story, brick, eclectic building with Italianate- and Late Victorian-style design elements. It has segmental arched windows and a three-story, central square tower. At the rear of the courthouse are two- and three-story jail additions.

It was listed on the National Register of Historic Places in 1979. It is located in the Williamston Commercial Historic District.
