= Hickory Hill (Petersburg, West Virginia) =

Historic house in West Virginia, United States

- U.S. National Register of Historic Places
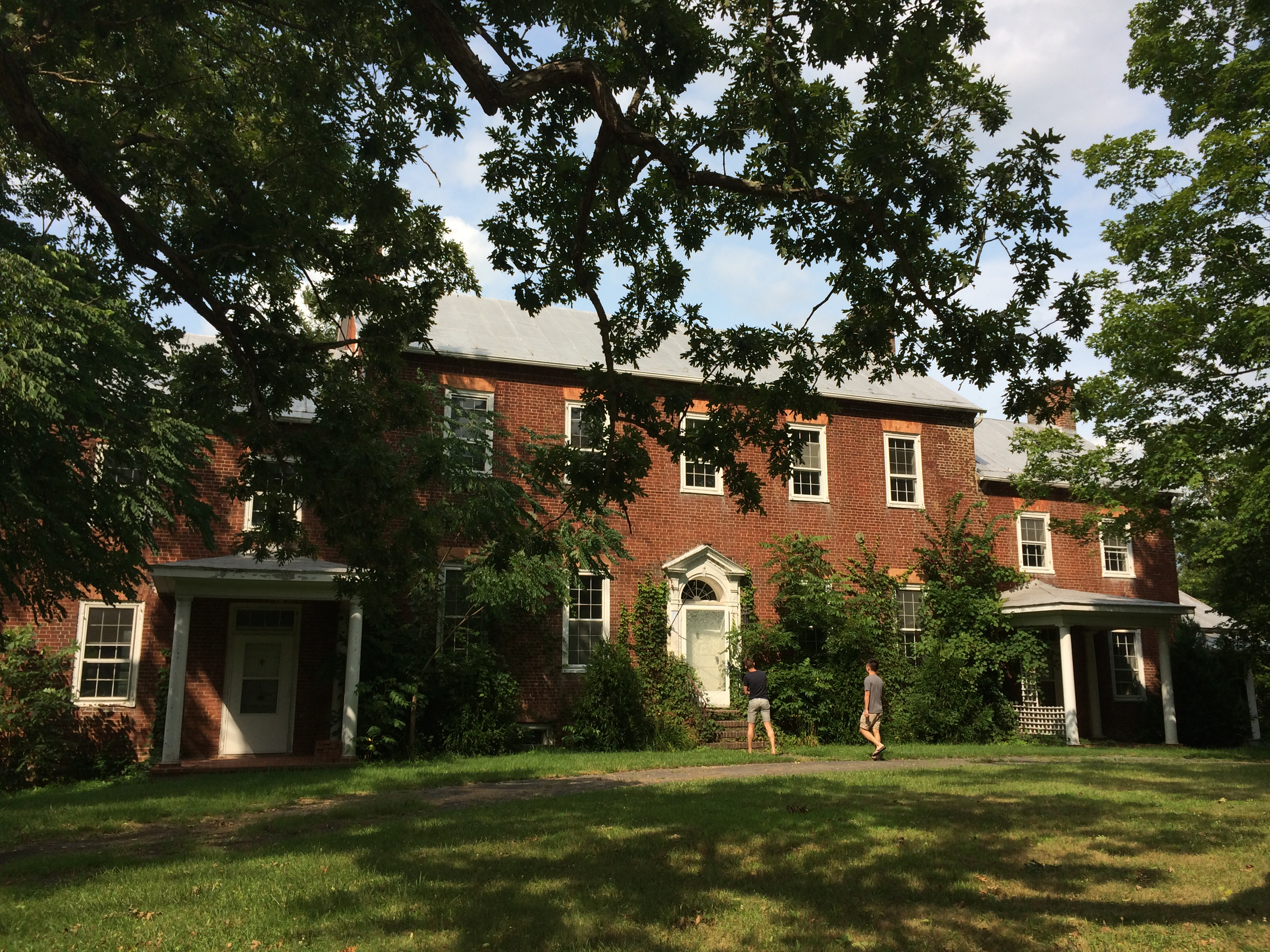

- Location within Eastern Panhandle of West Virginia Location within West Virginia Location within the United States
- Location: U.S. Route 220, near Petersburg, West Virginia
- Coordinates: 38°59′57″N 79°4′14″W
- Area: 1.5 acres (0.61 ha)
- Built: 1809
- Built by: Solomon Cunningham
- Architectural style: Federal
- MPS: South Branch Valley MRA
- NRHP reference No.: 85001596
- Added to NRHP: July 10, 1985

Hickory Hill is a historic home located near Petersburg, West Virginia. It is located in Hardy County, West Virginia. It was built in 1809, and is a two-story brick dwelling in the Federal style. It has a traditional five bay center entrance plan. Also on the property are a log barn and smokehouse.

It was listed on the National Register of Historic Places in 1985.
