= Martin County Airport =

Airport in Martin County, North Carolina, United States

- IATA: none; ICAO: KMCZ; FAA LID: MCZ

Summary
- Airport type: Public
- Owner: County of Martin
- Serves: Williamston, North Carolina
- Elevation AMSL: 75 ft / 23 m
- Coordinates: 35°51′44″N 077°10′42″W

Map
- Location of airport in North Carolina

Runways
Direction	Length		Surface
Direction	ft	m	Surface
3/21	5,000	1,524	Asphalt

Statistics (2021)
- Aircraft operations (year ending 5/30/2021): 12,500
- Based aircraft: 14
- Source: Federal Aviation Administration

Martin County Airport (ICAO: KMCZ, FAA LID: MCZ) is a county-owned, public-use airport in Martin County, North Carolina, United States. It is located six nautical miles (7 mi, 11 km) west of the central business district of Williamston, North Carolina. This airport is included in the National Plan of Integrated Airport Systems for 2011–2015, which categorized it as a general aviation facility.

Although most U.S. airports use the same three-letter location identifier for the FAA and IATA, this airport is assigned MCZ by the FAA but has no designation from the IATA (which assigned MCZ to Zumbi dos Palmares Airport in Maceió, Alagoas, Brazil). The airport's ICAO identifier is KMCZ.

== Facilities and aircraft ==
Martin County Airport covers an area of 110 acres (45 ha) at an elevation of 75 feet (23 m) above mean sea level. It has one runway designated 3/21 with an asphalt surface measuring 5,000 by 75 feet (1,524 x 23 m).

For the 12-month period ending May 30, 2021, the airport had 12,500 aircraft operations, an average of 34 per day: 96% general aviation and 4% military. At that time there were 14 aircraft based at this airport: 13 single-engine and 1 multi-engine.

== See also ==
- List of airports in North Carolina
