= Hassell, North Carolina =

- Town
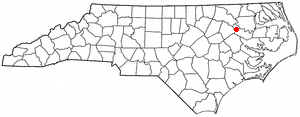
- Location in North Carolina
- Coordinates: 35°54′31″N 77°16′35″W
- Country: United States
- State: North Carolina
- County: Martin

Area
  - Total: 0.27 sq mi (0.69 km^{2})
  - Land: 0.27 sq mi (0.69 km^{2})
  - Water: 0 sq mi (0.00 km^{2})
- Elevation: 79 ft (24 m)

Population (2020)
  - Total: 49
  - Density: 180/sq mi (71/km^{2})
- Time zone: UTC-5 (Eastern (EST))
  - Summer (DST): UTC-4 (EDT)
- ZIP Code: 27841
- Area code: 252
- FIPS code: 37-30040
- GNIS feature ID: 2406651

Hassell is a town in Martin County, North Carolina, United States. The population was 49 at the 2020 census, down from 84 in 2010.

== Geography ==
Hassell is in western Martin County, along North Carolina Highway 142. Williamston, the Martin county seat, is 14 miles (23 km) to the east, and Tarboro is 16 miles (26 km) to the west.

According to the U.S. Census Bureau, the town of Hassell has a total area of 0.27 square miles (0.70 km^{2}), all land. The town sits on the Atlantic Coastal Plain and mainly drains north toward Conoho Creek, an east-flowing tributary of the Roanoke River.

== History ==
=== Founding ===
In 1878, Hassel was first founded as a settlement named Dogwood Crossroads, later receiving a railroad station in 1880. The town was later renamed in honor of Elder Sylvester Hassel, a Primitive Baptist historian, educator and minister.

=== Incorporation ===
On February 17, 1903, Hassel was incorporated as a rural town, serving as a local hotspot for farmers' markets.

== Demographics ==
Historical population
Census	Pop.	Note	%±
1910	90		—
1920	85		−5.6%
1930	169		98.8%
1940	150		−11.2%
1950	137		−8.7%
1960	147		7.3%
1970	160		8.8%
1980	109		−31.9%
1990	95		−12.8%
2000	72		−24.2%
2010	84		16.7%
2020	49		−41.7%
U.S. Decennial Census

=== Racial and ethnic composition ===
Hassell town, North Carolina – Racial and ethnic composition Note: the US Census treats Hispanic/Latino as an ethnic category. This table excludes Latinos from the racial categories and assigns them to a separate category. Hispanics/Latinos may be of any race.
Race / Ethnicity (NH = Non-Hispanic)	Pop 2000	Pop 2010	Pop 2020	% 2000	% 2010	% 2020
White alone (NH)	27	35	11	37.50%	41.67%	22.45%
Black or African American alone (NH)	45	49	33	62.50%	58.33%	67.35%
Native American or Alaska Native alone (NH)	0	0	0	0.00%	0.00%	0.00%
Asian alone (NH)	0	0	0	0.00%	0.00%	0.00%
Native Hawaiian or Pacific Islander alone (NH)	0	0	0	0.00%	0.00%	0.00%
Other Race alone (NH)	0	0	1	0.00%	0.00%	2.04%
Mixed Race or Multiracial (NH)	0	0	2	0.00%	0.00%	4.08%
Hispanic or Latino (any race)	0	0	2	0.00%	0.00%	4.08%
Total	72	84	49	100.00%	100.00%	100.00%

=== 2000 census ===
As of the census of 2000, there were 72 people, 32 households, and 20 families residing in the town. The population density was 266.2 people per square mile (102.8 people/km^{2}). There were 33 housing units at an average density of 122.0 per square mile (47.1/km^{2}). The racial makeup of the town was 37.50% White, and 62.50% African American.

There were 32 households, out of which 15.6% had children under the age of 18 living with them, 43.8% were married couples living together, 15.6% had a female householder with no husband present, and 37.5% were non-families. 34.4% of all households were made up of individuals, and 12.5% had someone living alone who was 65 years of age or older. The average household size was 2.25 and the average family size was 2.85.

In the town the population was spread out, with 19.4% under the age of 18, 1.4% from 18 to 24, 26.4% from 25 to 44, 27.8% from 45 to 64, and 25.0% who were 65 years of age or older. The median age was 46 years. For every 100 females there were 100.0 males. For every 100 females age 18 and over, there were 100.0 males.

The median income for a household in the town was $12,250, and the median income for a family was $19,167. Males had a median income of $29,375 versus $38,750 for females. The per capita income for the town was $12,498. There were 33.3% of families and 30.0% of the population living below the poverty line, including 38.5% of under eighteens and 63.6% of those over 64.
