= Bear Grass, North Carolina =

- Town
- Location within North Carolina Location within the United States
- Coordinates: 35°45′59″N 77°07′44″W
- Country: United States
- State: North Carolina
- County: Martin

Area
  - Total: 0.25 sq mi (0.66 km^{2})
  - Land: 0.25 sq mi (0.66 km^{2})
  - Water: 0 sq mi (0.00 km^{2})
- Elevation: 59 ft (18 m)

Population (2020)
  - Total: 89
  - Density: 351.0/sq mi (135.51/km^{2})
- Time zone: UTC-5 (Eastern (EST))
  - Summer (DST): UTC-4 (EDT)
- ZIP Code: 27892
- Area code: 252
- FIPS code: 37-04180
- GNIS feature ID: 2405220

Bear Grass is a town in Martin County, North Carolina, United States. The population was 89 at the 2020 census, up from 73 in 2010.

== History ==
The town of Bear Grass, located in the southern part of Martin County, was named for a type of yucca (Yucca flaccida) that grows less than two feet in height and is found abundantly in the region. One of the first settlers to the area was John Swinson, who received a large tract of land from the Earl of Granville, the last Lord Proprietor, in 1761. Bear Grass Swamp was a part of this property and was mentioned in Swinson's deed. Many of the early settlers were farmers whose principal crops of cotton and corn were sold in towns along the Tar and Roanoke rivers. Sheep, cattle, and hogs were also raised in large numbers, and farmers often supplemented their income with shingle making, woodcrafts, and the production of tar and turpentine from the area's abundant forests.

Though the congregation of the Bear Grass Primitive Baptist Church organized in 1828, the Bear Grass community did not emerge until after the Civil War. A public school constructed of logs was founded by the late 1860s, directly across the street from the existing school. Reuben H. Rogerson opened a general mercantile store in the 1880s, followed in the early 1900s by several additional general merchandise stores and a blacksmith shop. The community's development was hindered by it not being located along a navigable stream or on either of the railroad lines traversing Martin County. A post office was established in 1885, although it was closed less than two years later.

Records are limited, complicated by the fact that Bear Grass businesses were listed in directories with Williamston addresses because that was the nearest post office. But by the turn of the century, the community consisted of several legal distilleries, cotton gins, sawmills, grist mills and blacksmith shops. Reuben H. Rogerson's two-story steam-powered sawmill and cotton gin was one of the area's largest before being destroyed by fire in November 1908.

The first decade of the 20th century witnessed considerable growth in the community. After several meetings in early 1909, the town's merchants drew up a charter, and on February 16, 1909, the North Carolina General Assembly granted a charter to the town of Bear Grass.

An unusual physical feature of the town is that, when incorporated, the boundary was a circle with a radius of 500 yards (460 m) from a white oak "near a well at the stores of Rogers Brothers and Cowing [sic] Brothers." These limits remain today, making Bear Grass one of the few towns in the state laid out in this manner.

Local artist Henry C. Cowen created two statues that enliven the Bear Grass School campus. The "rampant bear" statue standing in front of the school was sculpted in 1981. The statue of George Washington in front of the Yucca House (formerly the Bear Grass School teacherage) was commissioned by the Bear Grass Ruritan Club in honor of the country's constitutional bicentennial in 1987. Cowen also produced several war memorial soldiers located on the corner of Green Street and Ayers Avenue.

Beginning in 2014, Bear Grass hosts the annual Chicken Mull Festival. Chicken mull is a local comfort food consisting of parboiled chicken, broth, crushed soda crackers, chopped boiled eggs and seasoning. The festival is held each year in the fall, and includes the sale of locally made goods, fundraisers for various local organizations, sale of chicken mull, and other festivities. Musical presentations by gospel, country and bluegrass bands are also included.

== Geography ==
Bear Grass is in southern Martin County on the Atlantic Coastal Plain, 8 miles (13 km) southwest of Williamston, the county seat. According to the U.S. Census Bureau, the town has a total area of 0.25 square miles (0.65 km^{2}), all land. The elevation in the town is 59 feet (18.1 m) above sea level.

== Demographics ==
Historical population
Census	Pop.	Note	%±
1910	56		—
1920	108		92.9%
1930	131		21.3%
1940	114		−13.0%
1950	128		12.3%
1960	103		−19.5%
1970	99		−3.9%
1980	82		−17.2%
1990	77		−6.1%
2000	53		−31.2%
2010	73		37.7%
2020	89		21.9%
U.S. Decennial Census

As of the census of 2000, there were 53 people, 26 households, and 17 families residing in the town. The population density was 197.3 inhabitants per square mile (76.2/km^{2}). There were 28 housing units at an average density of 104.2 per square mile (40.2/km^{2}). The racial makeup of the town was 100.00% White.

There were 26 households, out of which 15.4% had children under the age of 18 living with them, 53.8% were married couples living together, 11.5% had a female householder with no husband present, and 34.6% were non-families. 34.6% of all households were made up of individuals, and 11.5% had someone living alone who was 65 years of age or older. The average household size was 2.04 and the average family size was 2.53.

In the town, the population was spread out, with 15.1% under the age of 18, 7.5% from 18 to 24, 15.1% from 25 to 44, 37.7% from 45 to 64, and 24.5% who were 65 years of age or older. The median age was 54 years. For every 100 females, there were 76.7 males. For every 100 females age 18 and over, there were 80.0 males.

The median income for a household in the town was $24,375, and the median income for a family was $30,625. Males had a median income of $14,375 versus $38,333 for females. The per capita income for the town was $18,562. There were 24.0% of families and 22.7% of the population living below the poverty line, including 41.7% of under eighteens and 44.4% of those over 64.

== Education ==
Bear Grass Charter School
