= Jamesville, North Carolina =

- Town
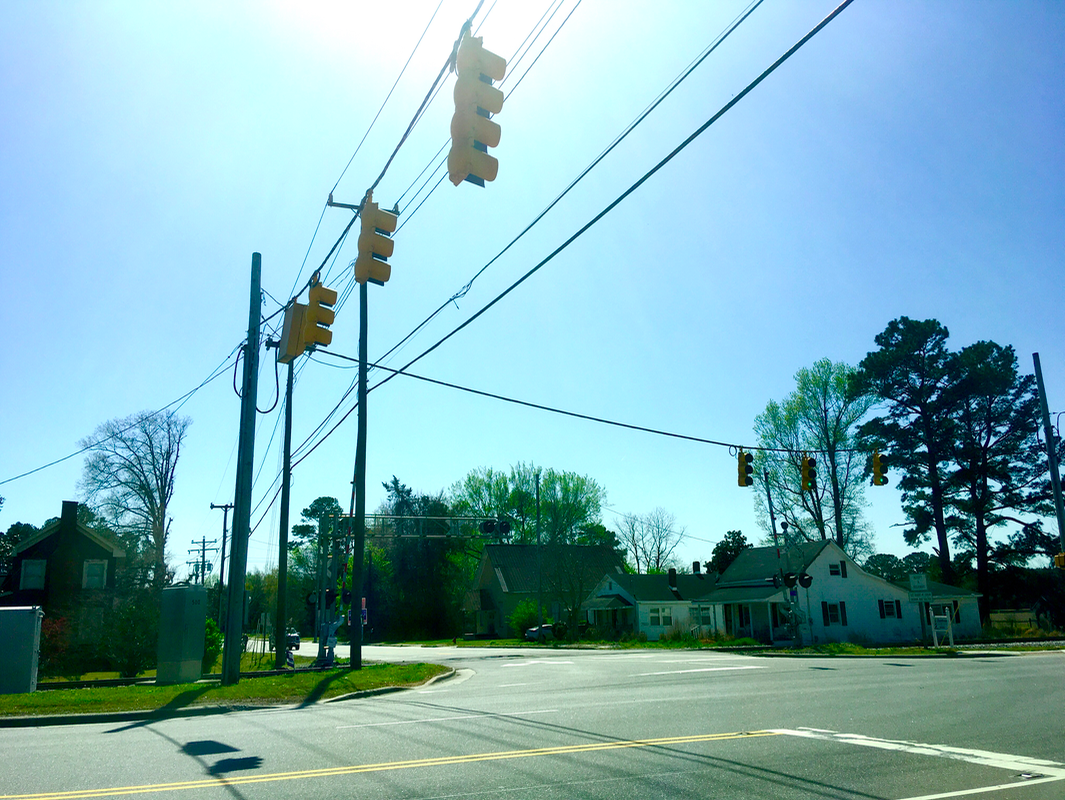

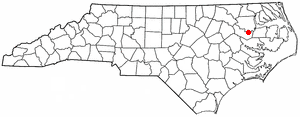
- Location in North Carolina
- Coordinates: 35°48′44″N 76°54′01″W
- Country: United States
- State: North Carolina
- County: Martin

Area
  - Total: 1.46 sq mi (3.77 km^{2})
  - Land: 1.46 sq mi (3.77 km^{2})
  - Water: 0 sq mi (0.00 km^{2})
- Elevation: 36 ft (11 m)

Population (2020)
  - Total: 424
  - Density: 291.1/sq mi (112.41/km^{2})
- Time zone: UTC-5 (Eastern (EST))
  - Summer (DST): UTC-4 (EDT)
- ZIP Code: 27846
- Area code: 252
- FIPS code: 37-34320
- GNIS feature ID: 2405905
- Website: www.townofjamesvillenc.com

Jamesville is a town in Martin County, North Carolina, United States. The population was 424 at the 2020 census, down from 491 in 2010.

== Geography ==
Jamesville is in eastern Martin County, bordered to the north by the Roanoke River, which forms the Bertie County line. U.S. Route 64 passes through the south side of town, leading west 10 miles (16 km) to Williamston, the Martin county seat, and east the same distance to Plymouth.

According to the U.S. Census Bureau, the town has a total area of 1.46 square miles (3.78 km^{2}), all land.

== Demographics ==
Historical population
Census	Pop.	Note	%±
1860	46		—
1870	150		226.1%
1880	299		99.3%
1890	346		15.7%
1900	235		−32.1%
1910	398		69.4%
1920	389		−2.3%
1930	344		−11.6%
1940	499		45.1%
1950	529		6.0%
1960	538		1.7%
1970	533		−0.9%
1980	604		13.3%
1990	612		1.3%
2000	502		−18.0%
2010	491		−2.2%
2020	424		−13.6%
U.S. Decennial Census

As of the census of 2000, there were 502 people, 199 households, and 140 families residing in the town. The population density was 375.1 people per square mile (144.8 people/km^{2}). There were 233 housing units at an average density of 174.1 per square mile (67.2/km^{2}). The racial makeup of the town was 64.94% White, 33.86% African American, 1.00% from other races, and 0.20% from two or more races. Hispanic or Latino of any race were 1.20% of the population.

There were 199 households, out of which 32.2% had children under the age of 18 living with them, 46.2% were married couples living together, 18.6% had a female householder with no husband present, and 29.6% were non-families. 27.6% of all households were made up of individuals, and 16.1% had someone living alone who was 65 years of age or older. The average household size was 2.52 and the average family size was 3.04.

In the town, the population was spread out, with 28.1% under the age of 18, 6.2% from 18 to 24, 25.1% from 25 to 44, 22.1% from 45 to 64, and 18.5% who were 65 years of age or older. The median age was 38 years. For every 100 females, there were 92.3 males. For every 100 females age 18 and over, there were 81.4 males.

The median income for a household in the town was $28,438, and the median income for a family was $32,813. Males had a median income of $32,045 versus $20,208 for females. The per capita income for the town was $16,682. About 21.5% of families and 19.7% of the population were below the poverty line, including 31.7% of those under age 18 and 13.4% of those age 65 or over.

== Education ==
- Jamesville Elementary School
- Northeast Regional School Of Biotechnology & Agriscience

== In literature and fiction ==
The town of Jamesville is featured in Don Brown's historical fiction novel Destiny, the prequel to Brown's Navy Justice series.

== Notable people ==
- Jimmy Brown (1910–1977), Major League Baseball infielder with the St. Louis Cardinals
