= Everetts, North Carolina =

- Town
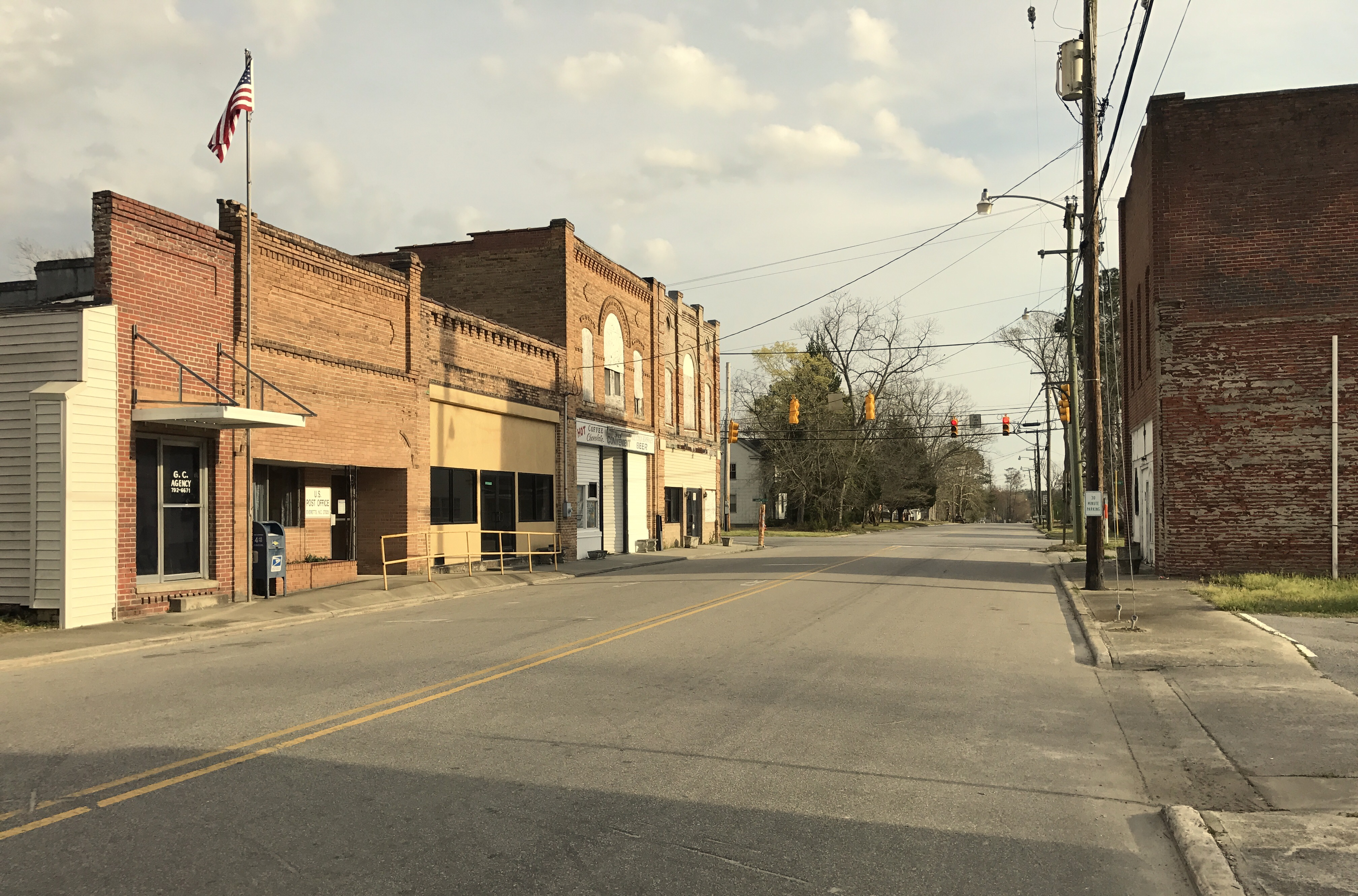

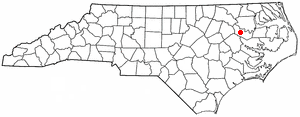
- Location in North Carolina
- Coordinates: 35°50′05″N 77°10′20″W
- Country: United States
- State: North Carolina
- County: Martin

Area
  - Total: 0.49 sq mi (1.28 km^{2})
  - Land: 0.49 sq mi (1.28 km^{2})
  - Water: 0 sq mi (0.00 km^{2})
- Elevation: 59 ft (18 m)

Population (2020)
  - Total: 150
  - Density: 304.5/sq mi (117.55/km^{2})
- Time zone: UTC-5 (Eastern (EST))
  - Summer (DST): UTC-4 (EDT)
- ZIP Code: 27825
- Area code: 252
- FIPS code: 37-22040
- GNIS feature ID: 2406473

Everetts is a town in Martin County, North Carolina, United States. The population was 150 at the 2020 census.

== History ==
Everetts was named for a family of first settlers.

== Geography ==
The town is in central Martin County along U.S. Route 64 Alt. It is 7 miles (11 km) west of Williamston, the county seat, and 4 miles (6 km) east of Robersonville.

According to the U.S. Census Bureau, the town has a total area of 0.5 square miles (1.3 km^{2}), all land.

== Demographics ==
Historical population
Census	Pop.	Note	%±
1900	127		—
1910	146		15.0%
1920	230		57.5%
1930	270		17.4%
1940	265		−1.9%
1950	244		−7.9%
1960	225		−7.8%
1970	198		−12.0%
1980	213		7.6%
1990	143		−32.9%
2000	179		25.2%
2010	164		−8.4%
2020	150		−8.5%
U.S. Decennial Census

As of the census of 2000, there were 179 people, 80 households, and 58 families residing in the town. The population density was 390.1 people per square mile (150.6 people/km^{2}). There were 85 housing units at an average density of 185.2 per square mile (71.5/km^{2}). The racial makeup of the town was 67.04% White, 30.17% African American, 2.23% from other races, and 0.56% from two or more races. Hispanic or Latino of any race were 2.79% of the population.

There were 80 households, out of which 28.8% had children under the age of 18 living with them, 50.0% were married couples living together, 15.0% had a female householder with no husband present, and 27.5% were non-families. 25.0% of all households were made up of individuals, and 12.5% had someone living alone who was 65 years of age or older. The average household size was 2.24 and the average family size was 2.62.

In the town, the population was spread out, with 22.3% under the age of 18, 5.0% from 18 to 24, 27.4% from 25 to 44, 22.9% from 45 to 64, and 22.3% who were 65 years of age or older. The median age was 42 years. For every 100 females, there were 80.8 males. For every 100 females age 18 and over, there were 82.9 males.

The median income for a household in the town was $21,964, and the median income for a family was $25,938. Males had a median income of $23,750 versus $17,188 for females. The per capita income for the town was $13,390. About 13.1% of families and 16.6% of the population were below the poverty line, including 15.6% of those under the age of eighteen and 2.8% of those 65 or over.
