= Martin County, North Carolina =

County in North Carolina, United States

- County
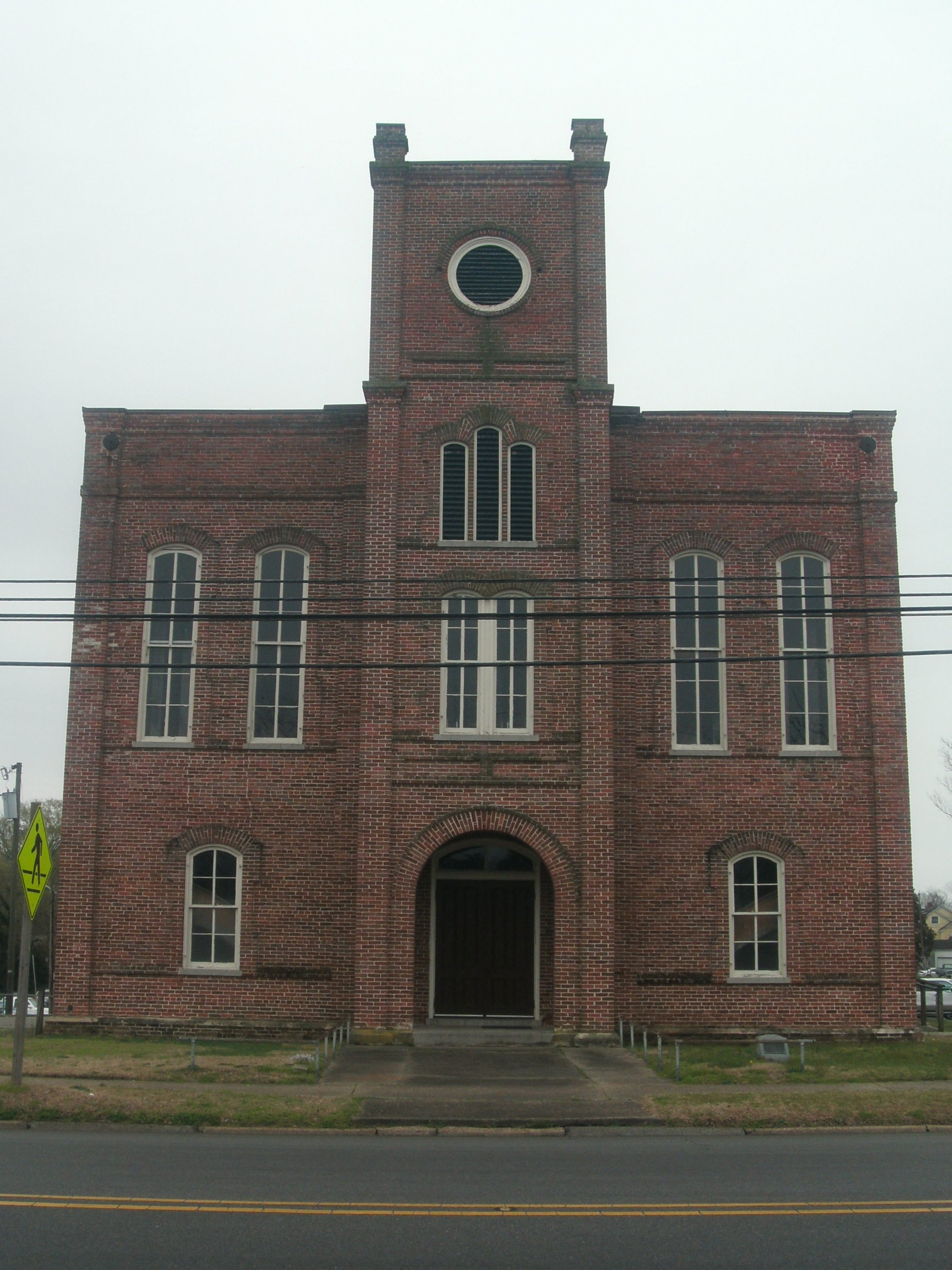
- Old Martin County Courthouse in Williamston

- Seal Logo

- Location within the U.S. state of North Carolina
- Interactive map of Martin County, North Carolina
- Coordinates: 35.85°N 77.12°W
- Country: United States
- State: North Carolina
- Founded: March 14, 1774
- Named for: Josiah Martin
- Seat: Williamston
- Largest community: Williamston

Area
  - Total: 456.70 sq mi (1,182.8 km^{2})
  - Land: 456.41 sq mi (1,182.1 km^{2})
  - Water: 0.29 sq mi (0.75 km^{2}) 0.06%

Population (2020)
  - Total: 22,031
  - Estimate (2025): 21,601 ▼
  - Density: 48.27/sq mi (18.64/km^{2})
- Time zone: UTC−5 (Eastern)
  - Summer (DST): UTC−4 (EDT)
- Congressional district: 1st
- Website: www.martincountync.gov

Martin County is a county located in the U.S. state of North Carolina. As of the 2020 census, the population was 22,031. Its county seat is Williamston.

== History ==
Martin County was formed in 1774 from the southeastern part of Halifax County and the western part of Tyrrell County. It was named for Josiah Martin, the governor of North Carolina from 1771 to 1776. Whereas Dobbs County and Tryon County, North Carolina, named for his predecessors, were abolished after American independence, Martin County was neither abolished nor renamed.

The Martin County Courthouse was listed on the National Register of Historic Places in 1979.

== Geography ==
According to the U.S. Census Bureau, the county has a total area of 456.70 square miles (1,182.8 km^{2}), of which 456.41 square miles (1,182.1 km^{2}) is land and 0.29 square miles (0.75 km^{2}) (0.06%) is water.

=== State and local protected areas/sites ===
- Fort Branch Civil War Site
- Lower Roanoke River Wetlands Game Land (part)

=== Major water bodies ===
- Conoho Creek
- Etheridge Creek
- Gardiners Creek
- Hardison Mill Creek
- Long Creek
- Roanoke River
- Smithwick Creek
- Tranters Creek
- Welch Creek

=== Adjacent counties ===
- Bertie County – northeast
- Washington County – east
- Beaufort County – southeast
- Pitt County – southwest
- Edgecombe County – west
- Halifax County – northwest

=== Major highways ===
- Future I-87
- US 13
- US 17
- US 64
- US 64 Alt.
- US 64 Bus.
- NC 11
- NC 42
- NC 111
- NC 125
- NC 142
- NC 171
- NC 903

=== Major infrastructure ===
- Martin County Airport

== Demographics ==
Historical population
Census	Pop.	Note	%±
1790	6,010		—
1800	5,629		−6.3%
1810	5,987		6.4%
1820	6,320		5.6%
1830	8,539		35.1%
1840	7,637		−10.6%
1850	8,307		8.8%
1860	10,195		22.7%
1870	9,647		−5.4%
1880	13,140		36.2%
1890	15,221		15.8%
1900	15,383		1.1%
1910	17,797		15.7%
1920	20,828		17.0%
1930	23,400		12.3%
1940	26,111		11.6%
1950	27,938		7.0%
1960	27,139		−2.9%
1970	24,730		−8.9%
1980	25,948		4.9%
1990	25,078		−3.4%
2000	25,593		2.1%
2010	24,505		−4.3%
2020	22,031		−10.1%
2025 (est.)	21,601	▼	−2.0%
U.S. Decennial Census; 1790–1960 1900–1990; 1990–2000 2010 2020

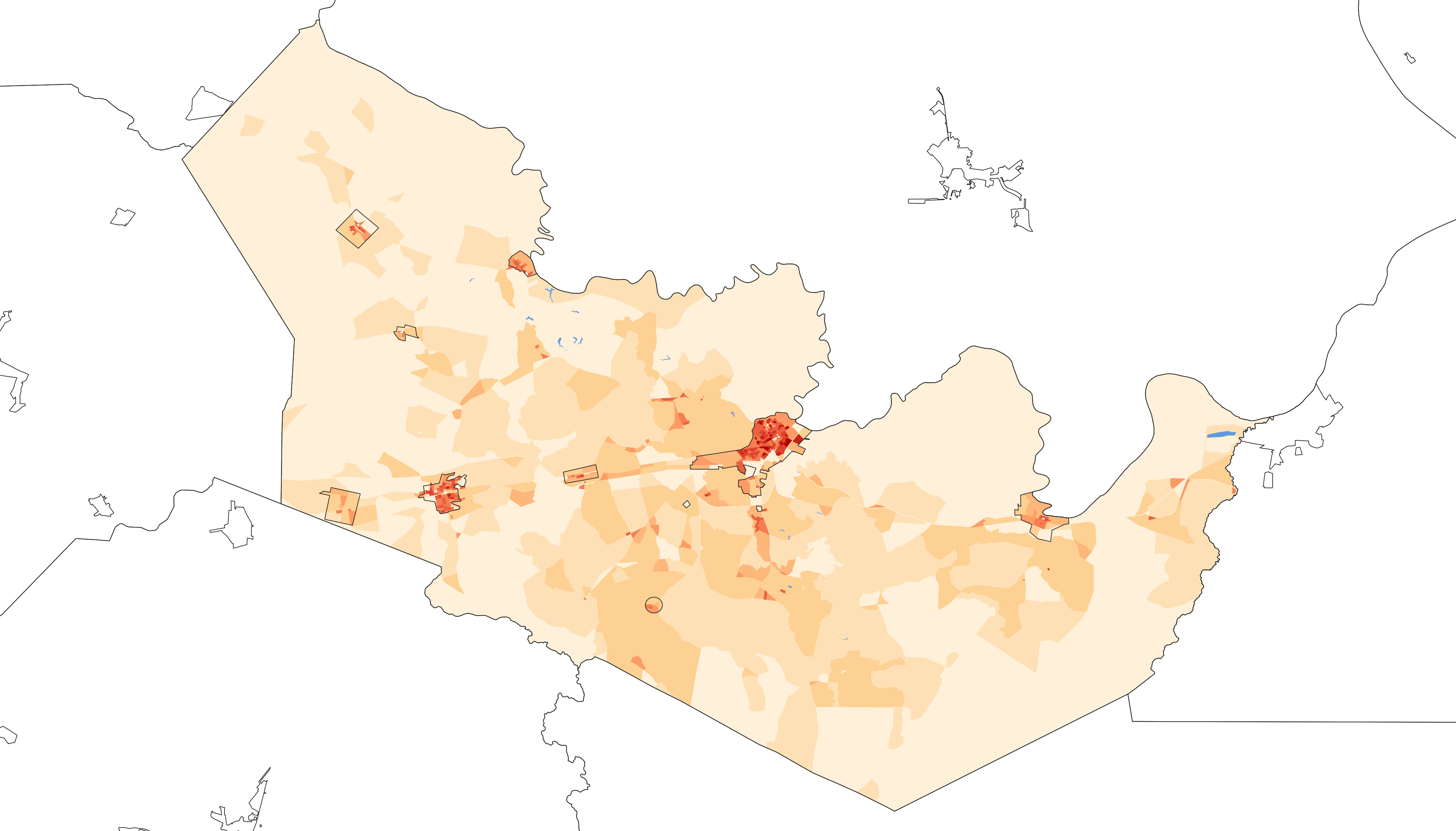
2020 population density of Martin County NC by census block

=== Racial and ethnic composition ===
Martin County, North Carolina – racial and ethnic composition Note: the US Census treats Hispanic/Latino as an ethnic category. This table excludes Latinos from the racial categories and assigns them to a separate category. Hispanics/Latinos may be of any race.
Race / ethnicity (NH = Non-Hispanic)	Pop 1980	Pop 1990	Pop 2000	Pop 2010	Pop 2020	% 1980	% 1990	% 2000	% 2010	% 2020
White alone (NH)	14,277	13,772	13,264	12,790	11,528	55.02%	54.92%	51.83%	52.19%	52.33%
Black or African American alone (NH)	11,398	11,149	11,542	10,601	8,868	43.93%	44.46%	45.10%	43.26%	40.25%
Native American or Alaska Native alone (NH)	2	20	70	65	69	0.01%	0.08%	0.27%	0.27%	0.31%
Asian alone (NH)	34	38	61	71	98	0.13%	0.15%	0.24%	0.29%	0.44%
Native Hawaiian or Pacific Islander alone (NH)	x	x	2	5	1	x	x	0.01%	0.02%	0.00%
Other race alone (NH)	14	0	10	10	64	0.05%	0.00%	0.04%	0.04%	0.29%
Mixed-race or multiracial (NH)	x	x	116	194	508	x	x	0.45%	0.79%	2.31%
Hispanic or Latino (any race)	223	99	528	769	895	0.86%	0.39%	2.06%	3.14%	4.06%
Total	25,948	25,078	25,593	24,505	22,031	100.00%	100.00%	100.00%	100.00%	100.00%

=== 2020 census ===
As of the 2020 census, there were 22,031 people, 9,554 households, and 6,195 families residing in the county.

The median age was 47.9 years. 20.0% of residents were under the age of 18 and 24.8% of residents were 65 years of age or older. For every 100 females there were 87.8 males, and for every 100 females age 18 and over there were 84.1 males age 18 and over.

The racial makeup of the county was 52.8% White, 40.5% Black or African American, 0.4% American Indian and Alaska Native, 0.4% Asian, <0.1% Native Hawaiian and Pacific Islander, 2.6% from some other race, and 3.3% from two or more races. Hispanic or Latino residents of any race comprised 4.1% of the population.

25.1% of residents lived in urban areas, while 74.9% lived in rural areas.

There were 9,554 households in the county, of which 26.4% had children under the age of 18 living in them. Of all households, 40.6% were married-couple households, 19.0% were households with a male householder and no spouse or partner present, and 35.4% were households with a female householder and no spouse or partner present. About 32.4% of all households were made up of individuals and 17.2% had someone living alone who was 65 years of age or older.

There were 11,080 housing units, of which 13.8% were vacant. Among occupied housing units, 68.0% were owner-occupied and 32.0% were renter-occupied. The homeowner vacancy rate was 1.1% and the rental vacancy rate was 5.9%.

=== 2000 census ===
At the 2000 census, there were 25,593 people, 10,020 households, and 7,194 families residing in the county. The population density was 56 people per square mile (22 people/km^{2}). There were 10,930 housing units at an average density of 24 units per square mile (9.3 units/km^{2}). The racial makeup of the county was 52.54% White, 45.37% Black or African American, 0.29% Native American, 0.24% Asian, 0.03% Pacific Islander, 0.90% from other races, and 0.63% from two or more races. 2.06% of the population were Hispanic or Latino of any race.

There were 10,020 households, out of which 31.60% had children under the age of 18 living with them, 50.30% were married couples living together, 17.60% had a female householder with no husband present, and 28.20% were non-families. 25.70% of all households were made up of individuals, and 11.90% had someone living alone who was 65 years of age or older. The average household size was 2.53 and the average family size was 3.02.

In the county, the population was spread out, with 25.50% under the age of 18, 7.50% from 18 to 24, 26.80% from 25 to 44, 25.00% from 45 to 64, and 15.20% who were 65 years of age or older. The median age was 39 years. For every 100 females there were 86.50 males. For every 100 females age 18 and over, there were 81.80 males.

The median income for a household in the county was $28,793, and the median income for a family was $35,428. Males had a median income of $29,818 versus $19,167 for females. The per capita income for the county was $15,102. About 16.30% of families and 20.20% of the population were below the poverty line, including 27.50% of those under age 18 and 25.70% of those age 65 or over.

== Law and government ==
Martin County is a member of the Mid-East Commission regional council of governments.

=== Politics ===
Martin County is a historically Democratic county; in 2004, it voted Republican for only the fourth time, the first three having been in the Republican landslides of 1872, 1972, and 1984. Barack Obama won the county back for the Democratic Party in both 2008 and 2012, but in 2016, it narrowly backed Donald Trump. In 2020, it narrowly supported Trump again, voting for a losing Republican nominee for the first time ever. On the same day, Martin County voted to reelect Democratic Governor Roy Cooper in the North Carolina gubernatorial election.

United States presidential election results for Martin County, North Carolina
Year	Republican		Democratic		Third party(ies)	
Year	No.	%	No.	%	No.	%
1912	229	15.13%	1,251	82.63%	34	2.25%
1916	281	16.03%	1,472	83.97%	0	0.00%
1920	530	17.15%	2,561	82.85%	0	0.00%
1924	216	9.71%	1,999	89.88%	9	0.40%
1928	411	12.73%	2,818	87.27%	0	0.00%
1932	94	2.42%	3,781	97.37%	8	0.21%
1936	111	2.42%	4,477	97.58%	0	0.00%
1940	106	2.24%	4,628	97.76%	0	0.00%
1944	133	2.93%	4,408	97.07%	0	0.00%
1948	163	3.36%	4,636	95.53%	54	1.11%
1952	415	7.02%	5,493	92.98%	0	0.00%
1956	449	7.27%	5,730	92.73%	0	0.00%
1960	737	11.23%	5,826	88.77%	0	0.00%
1964	1,511	23.86%	4,821	76.14%	0	0.00%
1968	1,221	14.97%	3,118	38.22%	3,818	46.81%
1972	4,188	68.76%	1,840	30.21%	63	1.03%
1976	1,931	29.81%	4,518	69.75%	28	0.43%
1980	2,564	34.59%	4,750	64.09%	98	1.32%
1984	4,266	52.32%	3,870	47.47%	17	0.21%
1988	3,149	46.61%	3,598	53.26%	9	0.13%
1992	2,958	36.90%	4,069	50.76%	989	12.34%
1996	3,590	41.98%	4,500	52.62%	462	5.40%
2000	4,420	47.19%	4,929	52.63%	17	0.18%
2004	5,334	51.03%	5,102	48.81%	16	0.15%
2008	5,957	47.50%	6,539	52.14%	45	0.36%
2012	5,995	47.38%	6,583	52.03%	74	0.58%
2016	5,897	49.29%	5,846	48.86%	221	1.85%
2020	6,532	52.09%	5,911	47.14%	97	0.77%
2024	6,601	54.83%	5,360	44.52%	79	0.66%

== Education ==
The primary and secondary public school functions are performed by Martin County Schools, a district covering the entire county. Martin Community College is located in Williamston.

== Communities ==
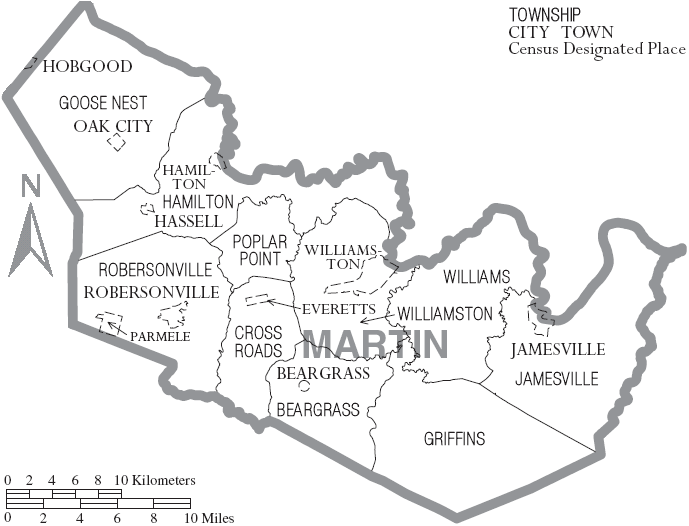
Map of Martin County with municipal and township labels

=== Towns ===
- Bear Grass
- Everetts
- Hamilton
- Hassell
- Jamesville
- Oak City
- Parmele
- Robersonville
- Williamston (county seat and largest community)

=== Townships ===
- Bear Grass
- Cross Roads
- Goose Nest
- Griffins
- Hamilton
- Jamesville
- Poplar Point
- Robersonville
- Williams
- Williamston

== Notable people ==
- Annie Moore Cherry, professor, author, and playwright
- Wilber Hardee, founder of Hardee's
- William Drew Robeson I, minister of Witherspoon Street Presbyterian Church
- Gaylord Perry, hall of fame Major League Baseball pitcher.

== See also ==
- List of counties in North Carolina
- National Register of Historic Places listings in Martin County, North Carolina
- North Carolina in the American Civil War
