= Williamstown High School =

Williamstown High School may refer to:

- Williamstown High School (Kentucky) — Williamstown, Kentucky
- Williamstown High School (New Jersey) — Williamstown, New Jersey
- Williamstown High School (Pennsylvania) — Williamstown, Pennsylvania
- Williamstown High School (West Virginia) — Williamstown, West Virginia
- Williamstown High School (Victoria) — Williamstown, Victoria, Australia
- Altmar-Parish-Williamstown High School — Parish, New York

See also:

- Williamston High School
