= Robersonville, North Carolina =

- Town
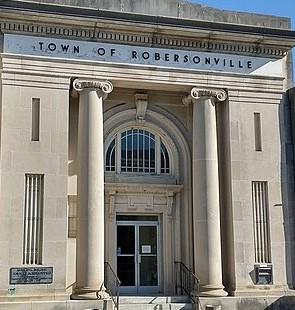
- Robersonville Old Town Hall (built 1921)

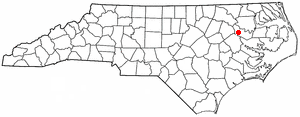
- Location in North Carolina
- Coordinates: 35°49′30″N 77°15′12″W
- Country: United States
- State: North Carolina
- County: Martin

Government
  - Type: Council-Manager
  - Mayor: Tina Brown

Area
  - Total: 1.21 sq mi (3.14 km^{2})
  - Land: 1.21 sq mi (3.14 km^{2})
  - Water: 0 sq mi (0.00 km^{2})
- Elevation: 72 ft (22 m)

Population (2020)
  - Total: 1,269
  - Density: 1,047.1/sq mi (404.28/km^{2})
- Time zone: UTC-5 (Eastern (EST))
  - Summer (DST): UTC-4 (EDT)
- ZIP Code: 27871
- Area code: 252
- FIPS code: 37-57100
- GNIS feature ID: 2407229
- Website: www.robersonville.org

Robersonville, incorporated in 1872, is a town in Martin County, North Carolina, United States. The population was 1,269 at the 2020 census. Robersonville is located in North Carolina's Inner Banks region. Once an affluent eastern North Carolina community, it is noted for its abundance of historic mansions and estates, due (large in part) to families obtaining wealth from the tobacco industry and later manufacturing. It is currently home to the East Carolina Motor Speedway.

== History ==
The earliest known residents of the Robersonville area were the Tuscarora and Morotock Native American people. According to various deeds, family bibles, wills, and church records, European settlers arrived many years before the Revolutionary War. One of the earliest known churches of the area was Flat Swamp Primitive Baptist Church, founded in 1776. Among the early settlers of this area was the family of Henry Robason, who is said to have been born in 1710 in England. Eventually the family name became "Roberson", and the family tree grew throughout the region. Before the Civil War, George O. Roberson and his father, William, owned a store originally located on the northwest corner of what are now Railroad and Roberson streets. The local militia trained at this store during the Civil War. After returning from the war, George built a store across the street from the original one.

Another primary landowner in the area before the Civil War was W.D. Barnhill. According to records, he owned some four hundred acres to the south of what is present-day Robersonville. In 1859, he constructed a plantation house which came to be known as "Pinegrove" (not to be confused with Pine Grove Plantation in SC). It was constructed amongst the pine groves of what would later become Robersonville to help keep the house cool during harsh summers. The Barnhill family lived at Pinegrove for more than four generations until the house caught fire in the early 1900's. The great-grandson of W.D. Barnhill, Gray Barnhill, constructed a new house on the site of the previous plantation house in 1910. This Queen Anne style structure still exists today with the only remnant of the previous plantation house being an old chimney attached to the west side of the current house.

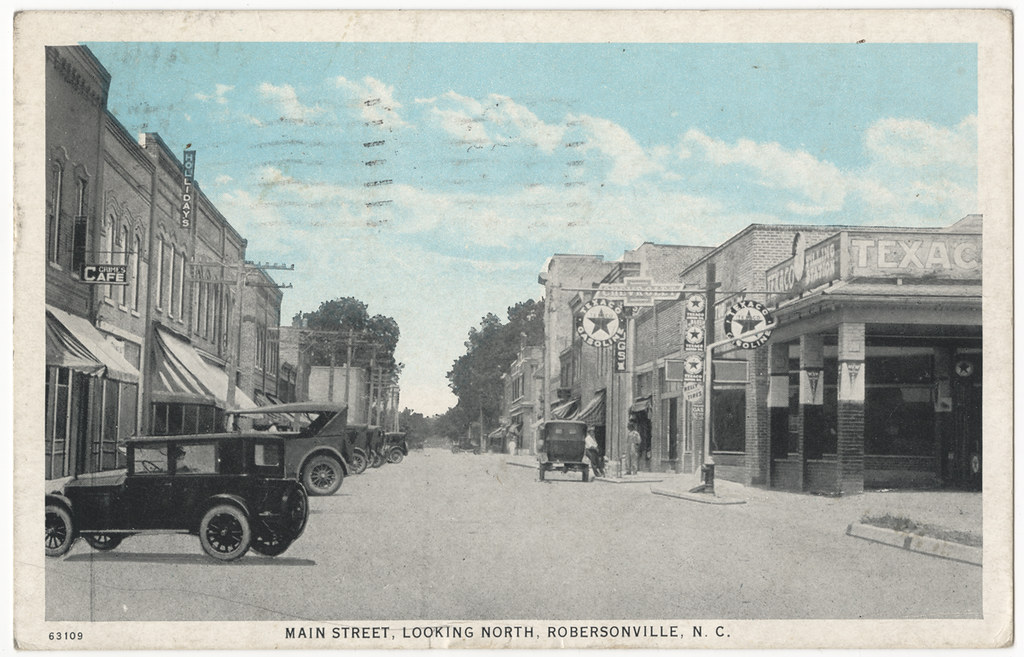
Downtown Robersonville (1927)

When the town was incorporated February 16, 1872, it became the first town in Martin County not located on the Roanoke River; thus, it wasn't dependent on the river for communication with other settlements. Instead, the railroad was the main artery of communication and trade. The town was named after Henry, William, and George Roberson. Of the three brothers, Henry D. Roberson is considered to be the "Father of Robersonville". He served as director, stockholder, and one of the foremost promoters of the railroad that ran from Williamston to Tarboro. It was first known as the Williamston and Tarboro R.R., but, the name was soon changed to the Seaboard and Raleigh Railroad, and then the Albemarle and Raleigh Railroad. It is now part of the Atlantic Coast Line system. Although the Seaboard and Raleigh Railway Company would not be incorporated until late 1873, town founders envisioned it as a prominent trading center and market for western Martin County. Growing slowly during its first decade, after the railroad's completion in October 1882, the town had eleven general stores, two physicians, and a number of industries by 1884. The population was then 400 residents, with an influx of farm families and ambitious young men moving here because of various entrepreneurial, educational, and social opportunities. The first mayor was William W. Roberson. The original town commissioners were Henry D. Roberson, Staton Everett, and Eli Askew. Vance L. Roberson served the longest tenure of public service of any Robersonville citizen. Henry Staton Everett served longer than any other mayor.

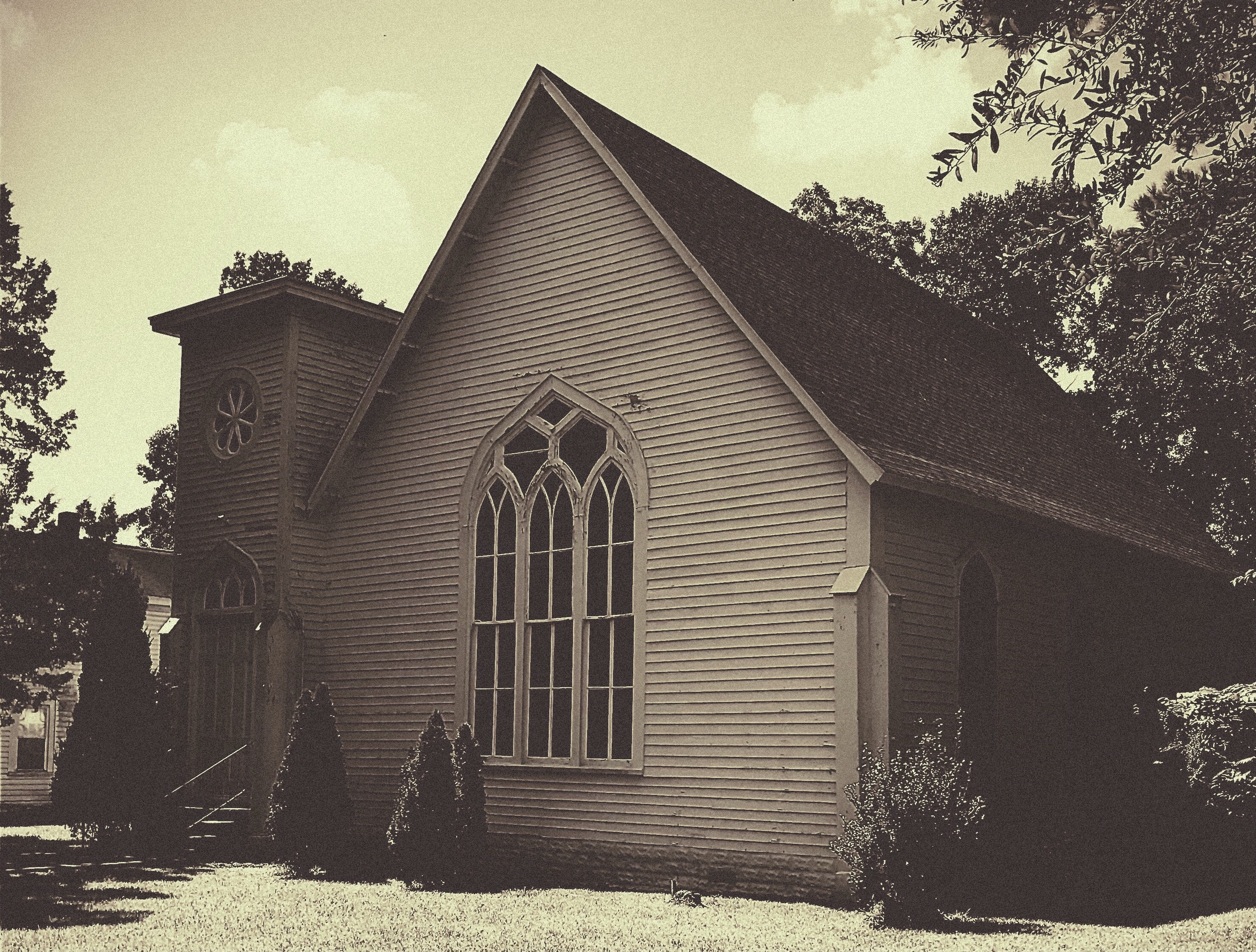
Adath Shalom Synagogue (ca.1922)

In the late 1800s, the Jewish Agricultural Society helped many Jewish families relocate from Russia to the United States. While most of these families settled in the Northeast, a few were relocated to eastern North Carolina due to its agrarian-based economy and abundance of affordable land. Most notably the Margolis, Smith (Schmidt), and Bernstein families came to the Robersonville area in the early 1900s and took to farming in addition to owning department stores and shops. In 1902, Adath Shalom (Congregation of Peace) was established. The first synagogue was built in 1907 and existed until it caught fire in the late 1940s. Afterward, most families attended religious services in nearby Rocky Mount, 34 miles (55 km) to the west. The handful of Jewish families who resided in Robersonville and nearby Williamston either died or relocated to larger cities, with the Margolis family being one of the last to leave in the 1990s.

Postal service began on July 10, 1874, with Wilson T. Outterbridge as the first postmaster. Mrs. Geneva Weaver served the longest term of any Robersonville postmaster. The first electric plant was built around 1914 and was privately owned and operated. Around 1940, the town contracted to buy current from Greenville. After World War II, a contract was negotiated with Virginia Electric & Power. Later, Carolina Power & Light was used. At one time, J.S. (Jim) Simpson supervised the distribution and maintenance of electricity, under the direction of Town Manager James E. Gray and Clerk Alice Briley. Today, the town has a contract with Electricities, Inc. The water and sewage disposal system was installed in 1924.

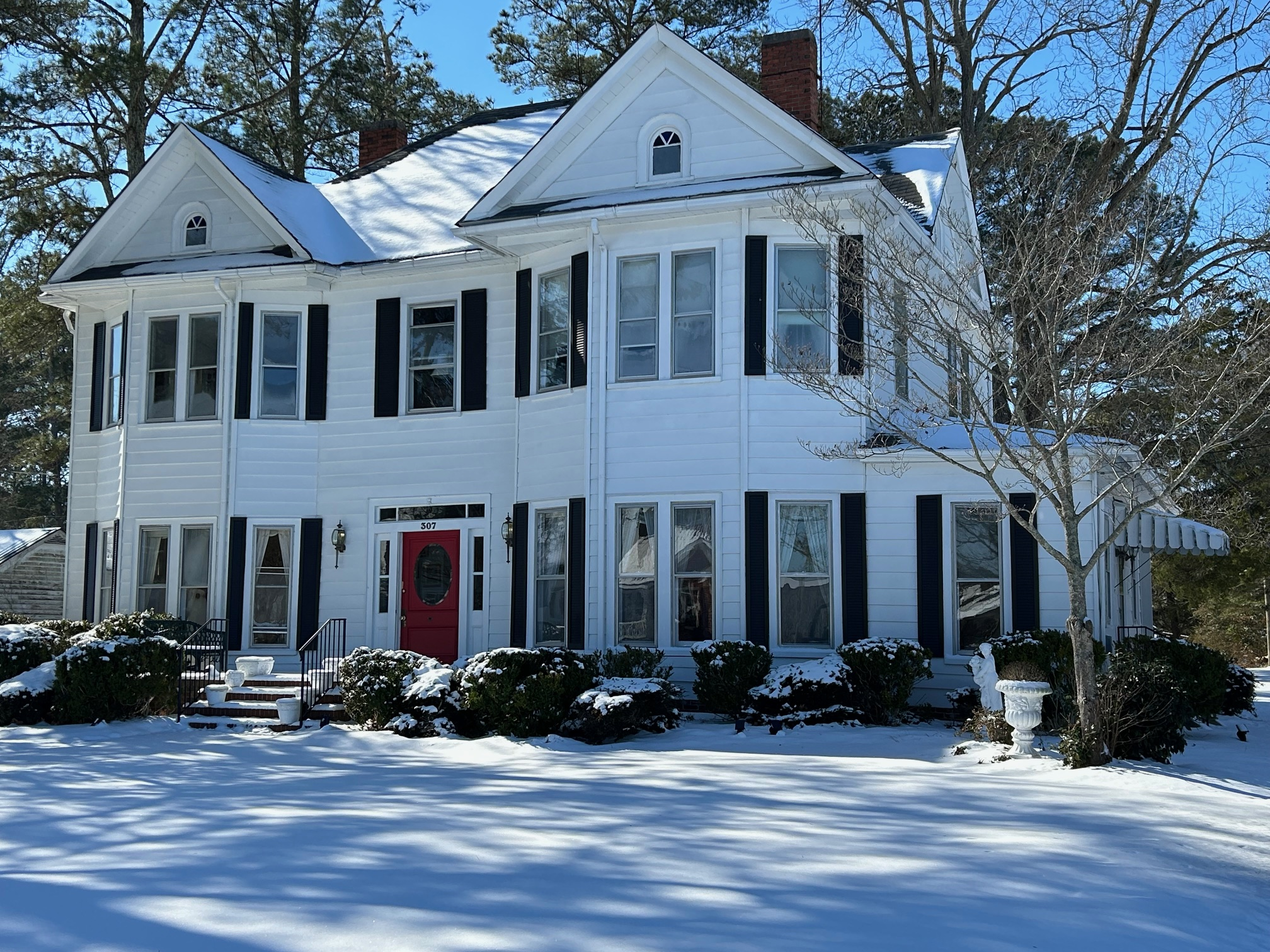
Pinegrove [Gray Barnhill House] (built 1910)

The Robersonville Primitive Baptist Church was founded in 1883. The land was given for the sole purpose of building a house of public worship and school. The original church was dismantled in 1883, and the present sanctuary, one of the oldest buildings in town, was completed the same year. The building was later restored in the 1990s by Dr. Everette James and is now home to the St. James Place Museum of southern folk art. The clapboard, late Gothic-Revival church building now houses original furnishings, folk art, and antique duck decoys. More than 100 North Carolina quilts, including 42 African-American examples, and hundreds of pieces of North Carolina pottery are exhibited.

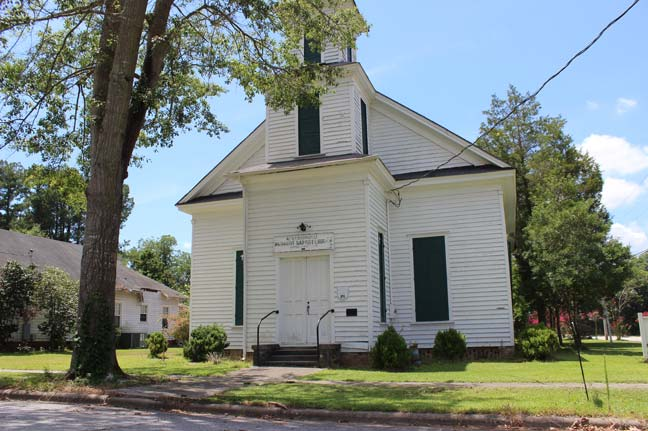
Robersonville Primitive Baptist Church (built 1910)

As site of the county's first tobacco market on August 7, 1900, Robersonville embarked on a second, more expansive era of development with a population that rose to 1,200 during the early 20th century. The town was becoming a rural trading center and market for agricultural commodities. The tobacco market was once reported to be the largest in the world with a single set of buyers. Mr. J.C. Andrews was chosen as "soliciting agent" to seek subscriptions to buy the land necessary for the market. In 1903, he and Mr. J.W. Ferrell purchased the Carolina and Southern Warehouses. Taylor Warehouse opened that same year and was run by W.H. Adkins, J.H. Taylor, and R.A. Bailey. These warehouses changed hands and names many times. In 1930, the New Red Front Warehouse was built and operated by Jimmie Taylor and Jim Gray. In the same year, Haywood Everett and J.R. Morris were the managers of Central Warehouse. The Adkins and Bailey Warehouse, which used to be Taylor Warehouse was now under management of W.H. Adkins and R.A. Bailey. In 1947, the Planters Warehouse was built on the opposite side of town from the other three. Mr. E.G. Anderson and Mr. H.T. Highsmith were the proprietors of the warehouse. In the spring of 1968, the Adkins and Bailey Warehouse burned down. Mr. James E. Gray financed the rebuilding of a new warehouse on the same spot. The new Gray's Warehouse was opened in the 1968 season. In 1971, Planters Warehouse was purchased by Mr. Norman Hardee and Mr. Edwin Lee. They renamed it Hardee's Warehouse. Also that year, Gray's, Red front, and Central Warehouses were under the ownership of James E. Gray, Jim Gray, R.K. Adkins, and Jack Sharp, taking the place of his late father-in-law, Mr. Charlie Gray. In 1973, Mr. James E. Gray died and his son, Harry Gray, took over his position. The tobacco market in Martin County did very well until 2001 when the larger companies began to contract directly with the grower.

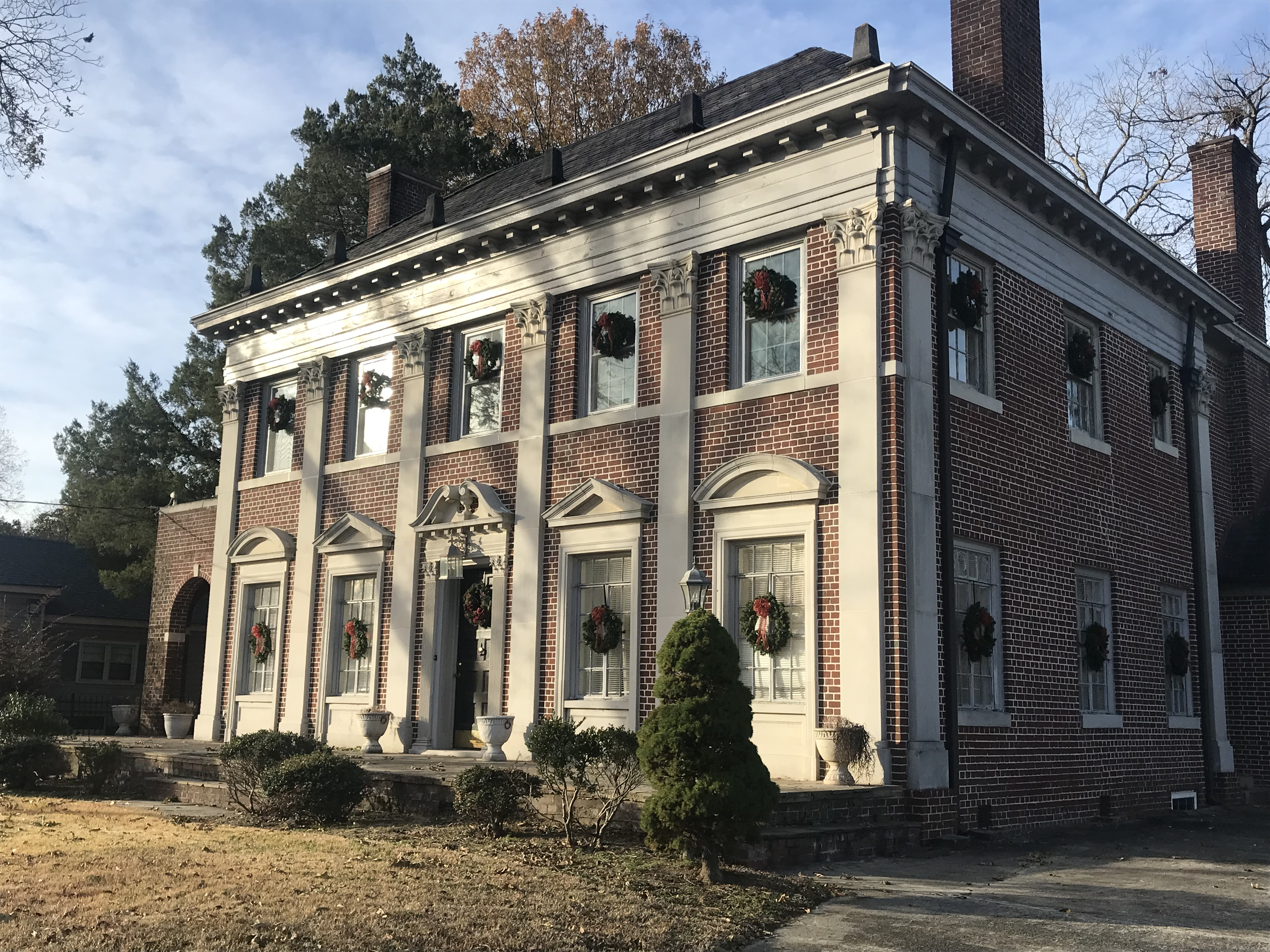
Oakhurst [Wilson House] (built 1931)

Throughout the 1990s and early 2000s, Eddie Vanderford and Harry Gray (Gray's Red Front and Central Warehouse), and Kenneth Roberson (Hardee's Warehouse) were running the auction sales in Robersonville. In 2001, Harry Gray leased Gray's Warehouse to Philip Morris as a tobacco receiving station and Mr. Gray contracted tobacco through Lester Warren, station operator and agent for Philip Morris. In 2008, Harry Gray retired from the tobacco business and Alliance One International took over the receiving station with Mr. Warren still the operator.

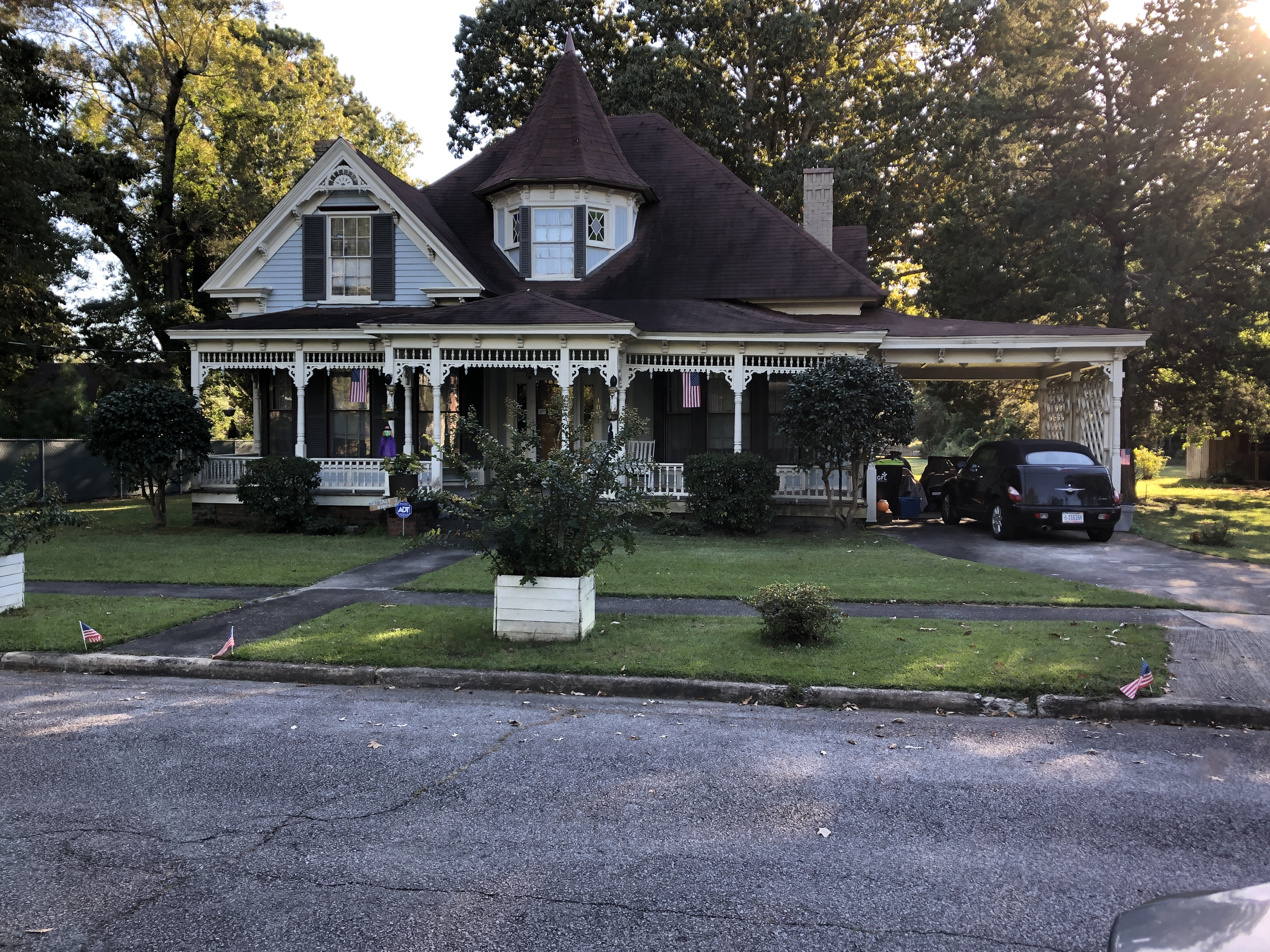
Roberson-Everett-Roebuck House (ca. 1900)

Robersonville has had a tobacco market since 1900. Central Warehouse and the Red Front Warehouses have been razed. Hardee's Warehouse is now owned by the Roberson's "Scattered Acres Farms." Gray's Warehouse is still receiving tobacco and tobacco is still King. Cotton is also one of the biggest cash crops. The growth of new industries brought new residential areas which opened to provide homes for the town's increased population – most notably New Town, a residential neighborhood that would become one of eastern North Carolina's most cohesive and civic-minded early 20th-century African-American communities.

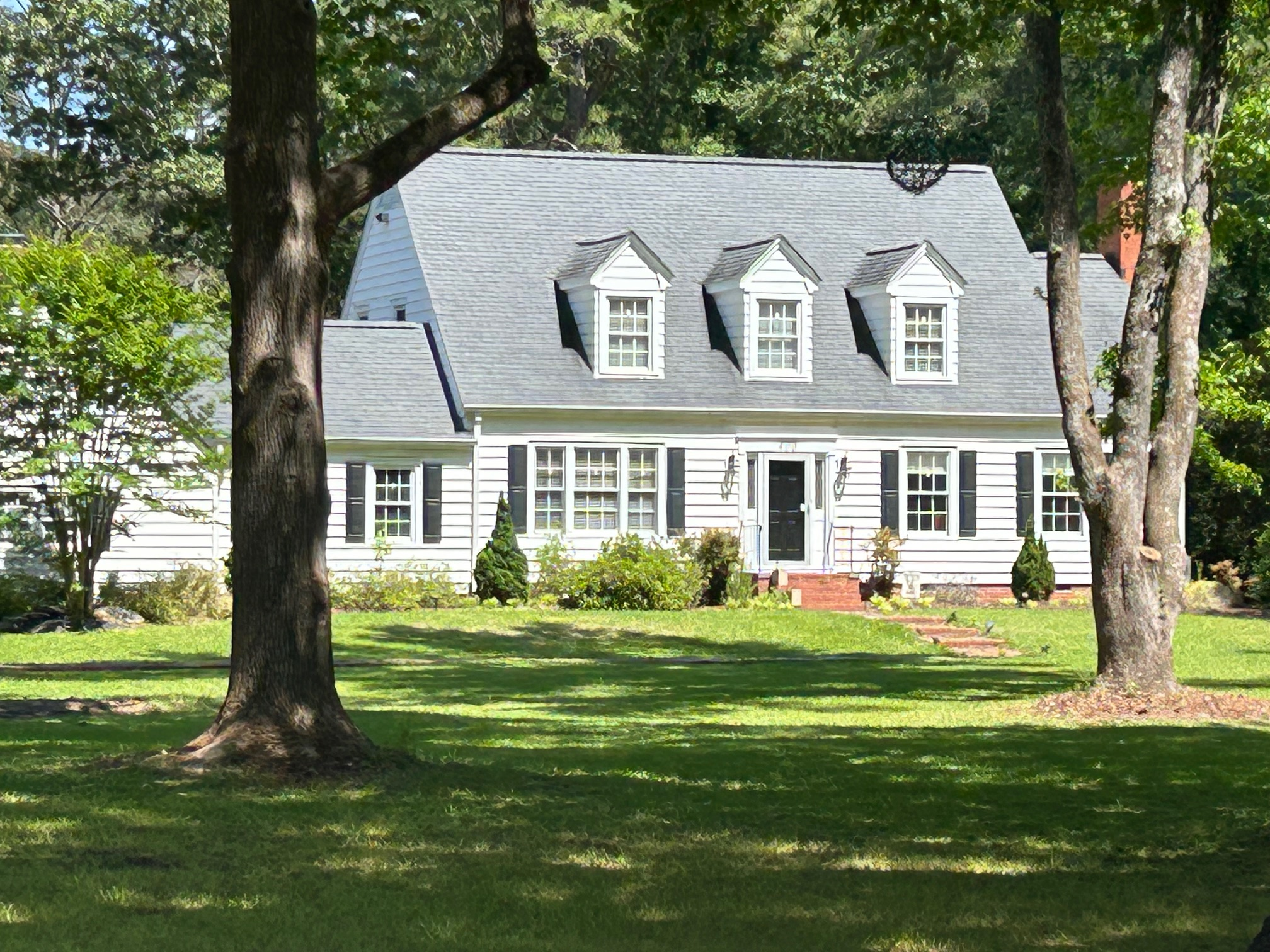
Everett House (built 1927)

The newly acquired prosperity, improved educational opportunities, and modern municipal services fostered a lively cultural and social life in town, where entertaining diversions and several cultural, civic, and social groups flourished. Even during the Great Depression, economic expansion slowed drastically in Robersonville, but the municipality benefited from state and federal relief programs. Inexpensive sports and popular social pastimes, such as Little League Baseball and bridge, also eased the hardships for many during those rough years.

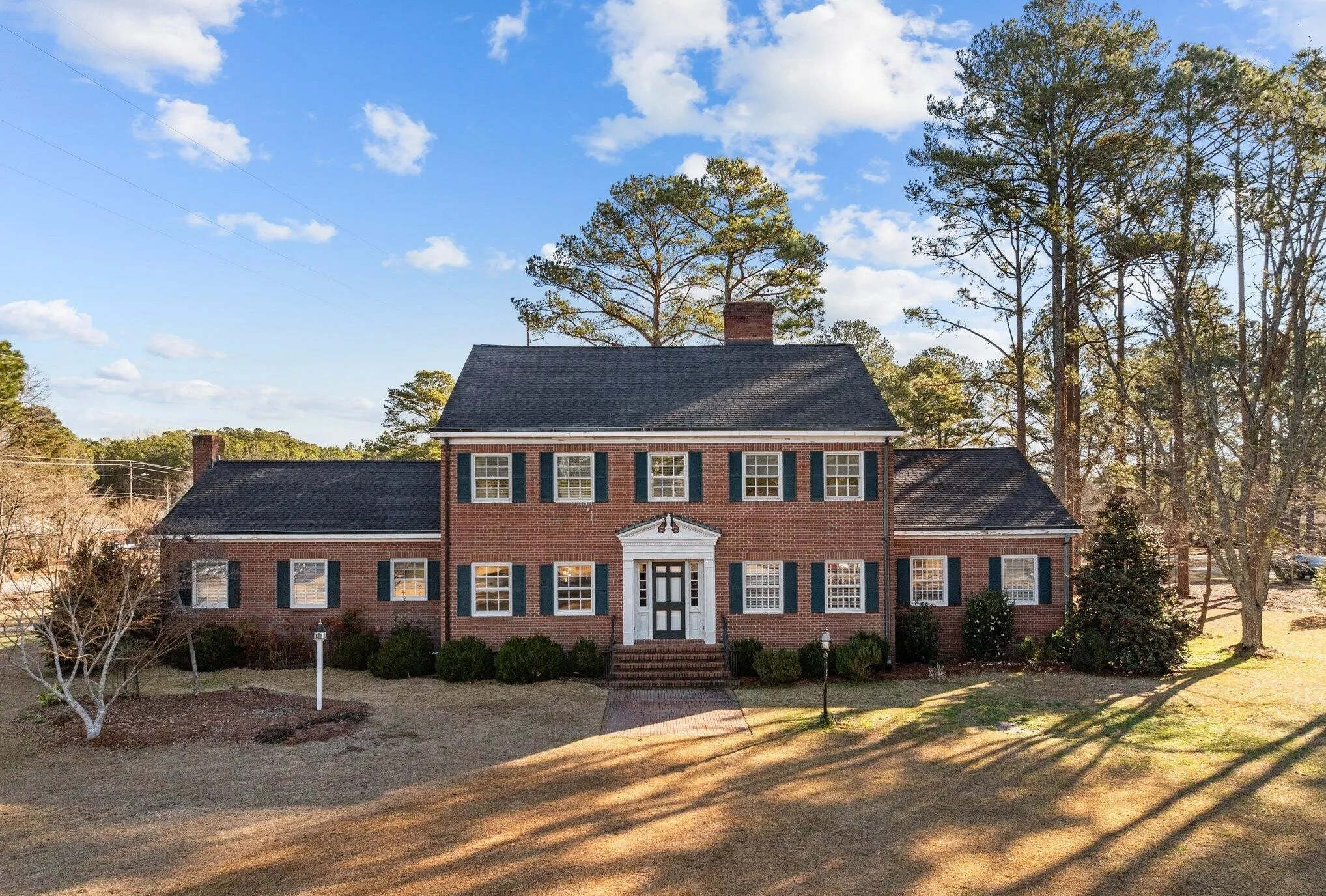
Irving Smith House (built 1925)

Robersonville soon developed into a leader of the Industrial Revolution, which has characterized the economy of Martin County in the last half-century. In 1910, the Robersonville Hosiery and Manufacturing Co. was incorporated. In 1912, the firm was reorganized as Robersonville-Tar River Hosiery Mill, Inc. The ruins of this brick building still stand on the corner of N. Railroad and Mill Streets. Most of the industry – a large cotton ginning plant, lumber mills, and grist mills – in the early part of the 20th century focused on the handling of agricultural or lumber products. Southeastern Tobacco Co. operated a large tobacco re-drying and stemming plant for many years. John Henry Roberson, Jr., a direct descendant of the founders of Robersonville, owned his own farm south of Robersonville, and was involved in many civic affairs with his brothers David Roberson and Grover H. Roberson. Grover H. Roberson left the Robersonville area in early 1940 to join the U.S. Navy. Grover saw action at the Battle of Anzio. After the Battle of Anzio, Grover was in the company of a group of other naval officers and had a special audience with Pope Pius XII at the Vatican in Rome, Italy.

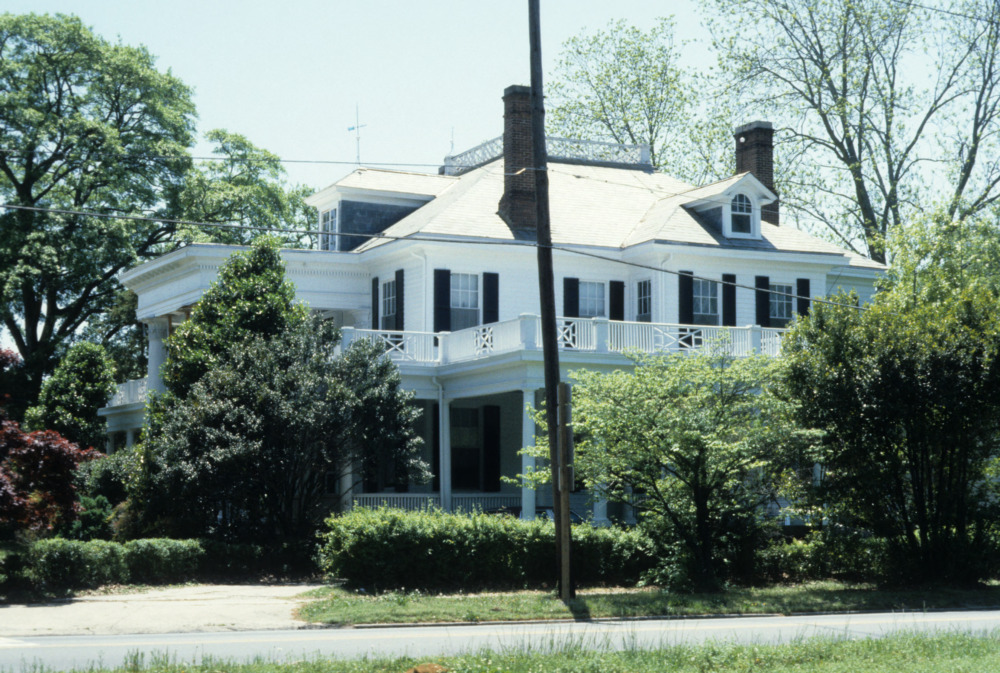
Magnolia Hall or W.J. Little House (built 1916) site of Summer Heat (1987 film)

Some of the early industries were not directly related to agriculture. The D.B. Parker Buggy Co. began in 1903 and operated until its product was replaced by the automobile. Established in 1905, the Carolina Brick Co. made ornamental bricks with a capacity of 30,000 daily. Since the late 1950s, a wider range of industry has appeared. In 1958, a poultry processing company was opened by Austin Farms. This plant was later purchased by Central Soya of Athens, Inc. and then later owned by Perdue. Also in 1958, Robersonville Manufacturing Co. was chartered as a maker of children's clothes. John Henry Roberson, Jr. lived on Broad Street and worked in the local tobacco market for many years. It expanded and was acquired by Blue Gem, which had its origins as the Hamilton Pants Manufacturing Company. Later it was changed to Southern Apparel. Robersonville Products Co. opened in 1970. As a division of Hallmark, it produced display fixtures for retail stores. After closing in 1993, the building was used by Empire Brush Company. Also in 1970, Blue Ridge Shoe Co. opened and began making children's shoes. Later the building was bought by Sandra Manufacturing Co., a sewing plant later known as Generation II, and then later as Ithaca Inc. and recently Caraustar. Microcell Corp., a hydrogen fuel company is moving into the old Caraustar building. Carolina Peanuts was started by locals as a small company but later grew after being acquired by Anheuser-Busch. Eagle Snacks later changed to Guy Snacks and for years was known as Ann's House of Nuts. Today, it is owned by Flagstone Foods based out of Minneapolis, MN.

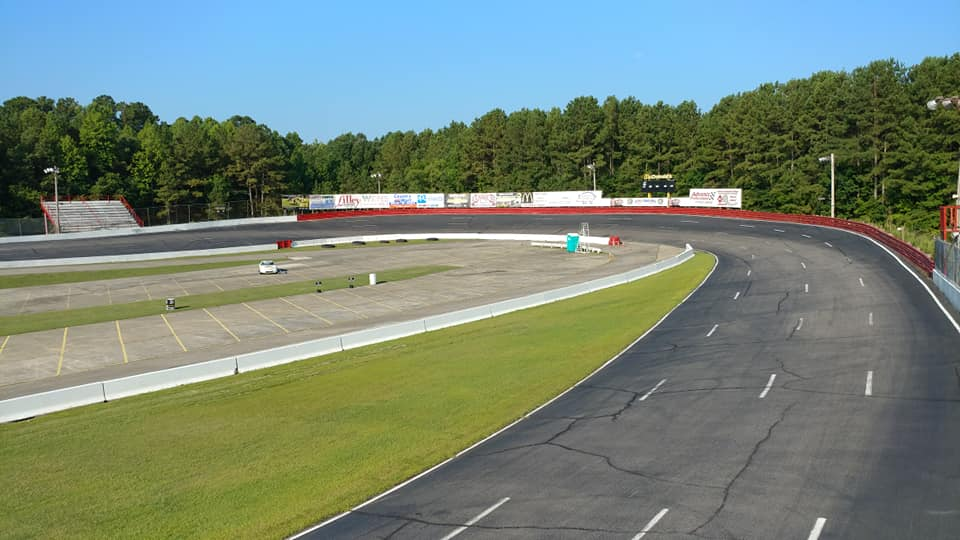
East Carolina Motor Speedway

Today the town's biggest entertainment venue is East Carolina Motor Speedway, a racetrack. East Carolina Motor Speedway opened its first season in 1989 with the thoughts of having a much needed attraction for racing fans throughout Eastern North Carolina. This D-shaped, 3/8 mile track has 24 degree banking in its turns as well as 10 degree banking on its straight-a-ways. The track is 40 feet wide, allowing cars to run three-wide for added excitement to its spectators. The grandstand can seat 3,000 fans and VIP booths located in turn four provide a first-class view of the entire track and pit area.

The Filling Station Restaurant has an interesting historical artifact. In the 1940s, Bill Bemis worked at Jim Johnson's store in nearby Gold Point, North Carolina and painted pictures for a hobby. Using enamel paints, he created a mural on the inside walls of the store. The mural depicts then store owner Jim Johnson and his daughters Mable and Peggy and their dog, in a fox hunt scene. This store was later called the Grant Vandiford store until it was moved to Robersonville to be part of the dining room of the Filling Station Restaurant. After the move, Bill Bemis retouched his work, so, the fox hunt mural is as bright and colorful today as it was 60 years ago.

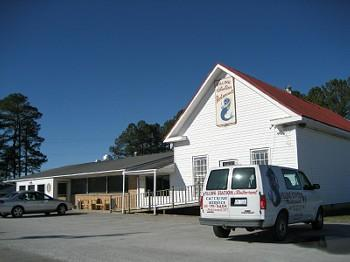
Filling Station Restaurant

The volunteer fire department was first organized in 1924 with William Gray as the first fire chief and police chief. The rescue squad was organized in 1959 and was the first one in Martin County. It was sponsored by the Junior Chamber of Commerce (Jay Cee's) under the leadership of John L. House and Robert E. Lee. A municipal building houses the police, fire, and rescue departments as well as the public library.

Although the railroad has been replaced by the new US 64 Bypass as the town's main link to the outside world, Robersonville continues to thrive, providing needed services, industry and entertainment to local and out-of-town residents alike.

=== National Register of Historic Places ===
- First Christian Church (April 28, 2005)
- Magnolia Hall [W.J. Little House] (September 19, 1985)
- Robersonville Primitive Baptist Church (April 20, 2005)
- Roberson-Everett-Roebuck House (August 30, 2010)

== Geography ==
Robersonville is in western Martin County at the intersection of U.S. Route 64 Alt and North Carolina Highway 903. US 64 Alt leads east 11 miles (18 km) to Williamston, the Martin county seat, and west 7 miles (11 km) to Bethel, while Highway 903 leads north 10 miles (16 km) to Hamilton and southwest 20 miles (32 km) to Greenville. The U.S. Route 64 freeway passes just north of the Robersonville town limits, with access from Highway 903. US 64 leads east to Williamston and west 18 miles (29 km) to Tarboro.

According to the U.S. Census Bureau, the town of Robersonville has a total area of 1.2 square miles (3.1 km^{2}), all land.

== Demographics ==
Historical population
Census	Pop.	Note	%±
1880	148		—
1890	228		54.1%
1900	275		20.6%
1910	616		124.0%
1920	1,199		94.6%
1930	1,181		−1.5%
1940	1,407		19.1%
1950	1,414		0.5%
1960	1,684		19.1%
1970	1,910		13.4%
1980	1,981		3.7%
1990	1,940		−2.1%
2000	1,731		−10.8%
2010	1,488		−14.0%
2020	1,269		−14.7%
U.S. Decennial Census

=== Racial and ethnic composition ===
Robersonville town, North Carolina – Racial and ethnic composition Note: the US Census treats Hispanic/Latino as an ethnic category. This table excludes Latinos from the racial categories and assigns them to a separate category. Hispanics/Latinos may be of any race.
Race / Ethnicity (NH = Non-Hispanic)	Pop 2000	Pop 2010	Pop 2020	% 2000	% 2010	% 2020
White alone (NH)	618	439	397	35.70%	29.50%	59.29%
Black or African American alone (NH)	1,064	986	760	61.47%	66.26%	31.28%
Native American or Alaska Native alone (NH)	0	3	1	0.00%	0.20%	0.08%
Asian alone (NH)	8	9	6	0.46%	0.60%	0.47%
Native Hawaiian or Pacific Islander alone (NH)	0	0	0	0.00%	0.00%	0.00%
Other race alone (NH)	1	0	6	0.06%	0.00%	0.47%
Mixed race or Multiracial (NH)	11	10	36	0.64%	0.67%	2.84%
Hispanic or Latino (any race)	29	41	63	1.68%	2.76%	4.96%
Total	1,731	1,488	1,269	100.00%	100.00%	100.00%

=== 2020 census ===
As of the 2020 United States census, there were 1,269 people, 668 households, and 452 families residing in the town. The population density was 1,398.5 people per square mile (540.0 people/km^{2}). There were 742 housing units at an average density of 637.0 per square mile (245.9/km^{2}). Out of 666 households, 23.1% had children under the age of 18 living with them, 38.8% were married couples living together, 22.1% had a female householder with no husband present, and 35.1% were non-families. 33.5% of all households were made up of individuals, and 20.8% had someone living alone who was 65 years of age or older. The average household size was 2.40 and the average family size was 3.07.

23.7% of the population was under the age of 18, 6.7% were from 18 to 24, 23.4% were from 25 to 44, 24.1% were from 45 to 64, and 22.1% were 65 or older. The median age was 42. For every 100 females, there were 75.0 males. For every 100 females age 18 and over, there were 69.6 males.

The median income for a household in the town was $43,384, and the median income for a family was $68,565. Males had a median income of $41,250 versus $29,375 for females. The per capita income for the town was $34,431. About 6.2% of families and 12.9% of the population were below the poverty line, including 4.2% of those under age 18 and 14.4% of those age 65 or over.

== Education ==
Martin County Schools operates public schools.

BHM Regional Library operates the Robersonville Library.

Martin Community College is the county's community college system.

=== History of education ===
- Robersonville Graded School (1902–1923)
- Outterbridge Grammar School (1923–1974) also known as Robersonville Elementary (whites)
- East End High School (blacks)
- Robersonville High School(1929–1975, later Robersonville Jr. High School grades 6–8 1976–2000)
- Roanoke High School (1975–2010)
- East End Elementary School (1974–2018) K-5
- Roanoke Middle School (2001–Present) 6–8
- South Creek High School (2010–2024)

The first classes were held in 1881 at the Stonewall Masonic Hall on Main Street. Built in 1871, this is one of the oldest building still standing in Robersonville. Mr. Stephen W. Outterbridge (Born January 23, 1825-Died January 28, 1915) taught at the masonic hall from 1885 until 1896 and at his private school located beside his home on Outerbridge Street until 1900. Commencement for the Robersonville school was conducted in the Masonic Hall in the late 19th century and later had to be held in the upstairs of what is now the Smith building when attendance grew. Later, students would take a special train that was run from Oak City via Parmele and Robersonville to graduation services in Williamston and back for the all-day occasion. Later, Robersonville began to hold its own commencement again. Students received music lessons on the pipe organ located in the Disciples of Christ Church located next door to the masonic hall. Stephen Outterbridge could be called the Father of Education in Robersonville. Both he and his wife Susan were admired greatly by the citizens of Robersonville. Although they never had biological children of their own, they molded the characters of many local youth. They helped to open Robersonville Graded School.

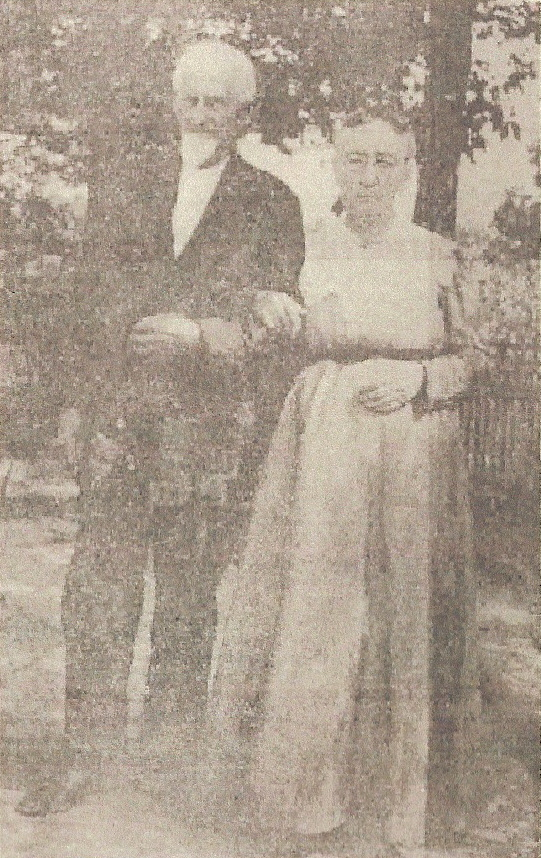
Professor and Mrs. Stephen Outterbridge

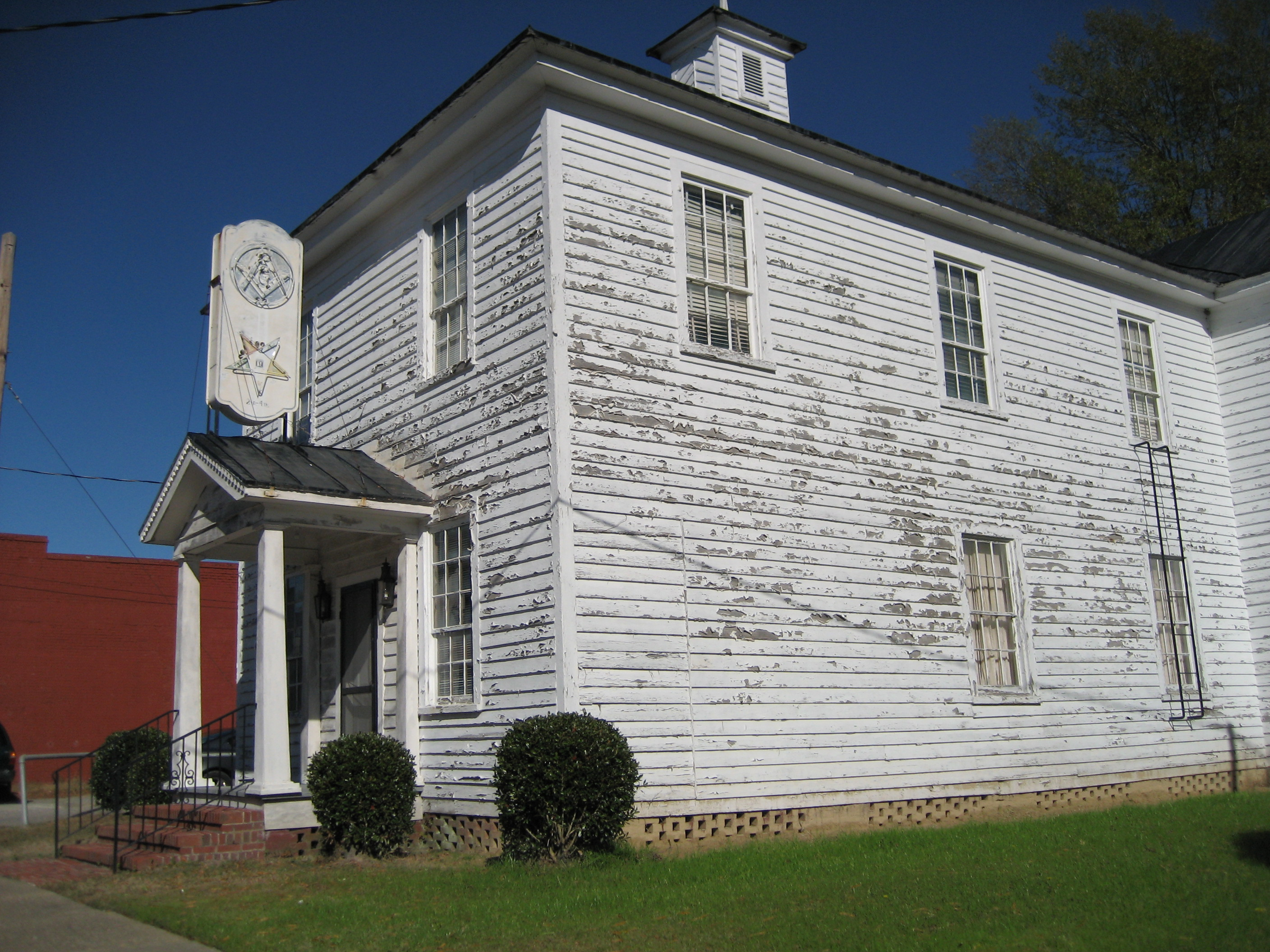
Stonewall Masonic Lodge / Eastern Star

The tobacco market caused an economic boom and encouraged the town to file a special deed in the Register of Deeds office May 6, 1902. In 1902, Mr. C. H. McLaurin became the first principal of Robersonville Graded School and served three years. Students came in from surrounding areas to board in local rooms and go to school. Mr. John Dawson Everett, Robersonville native and a graduate of Peabody College, came from Bethel in 1905 to become principal and remained through 1909. He and Miss Lelia Thornton and Miss Dora Mae Krider taught the first high school subjects. Miss Ethel Peele was the first female graduate in 1908, while Mr. C. Abram Roberson was the first male graduate. The 10th grade was added in 1912, and the eleventh grade added in 1917. Mr. William Gray, Mr. Thomas House and Mr. C. Abram Roberson, senior students, helped to plant cedar trees in front of the academy, in honor of Prof. and Mrs. Outterbridge at the time of their retirement. Two trees were planted. One was named Stephen and one Susan. The town had a rural librarian until a library room was added to the wood frame graded school in 1918.

When Parmele, Everetts, and Gold Point Schools consolidated with Robersonville, more space was needed. In January 1924, Robersonville's first brick building was opened for the white students on the same lot as the previous wood-framed structure, which was sold in two sections, one of which became a new colored school. The new white building, built at a cost of $62,406, had six grammar school and four high school teachers on the staff, including the principal, Mr. G. W. Rhodes. Improved facilities not enjoyed before included electric lights, running water, inside toilets, and janitor service. Telephone service was installed in 1926. Also in that year, the Robersonville Graded School district surrendered its private charter and became part of the Martin County System of Public Schools. The Betterment Association raised money for auditorium curtains and planted shrubbery in front of the building. In the summer of 1949, the county renovated by painting the inside of the building; adding new desks, new furniture in the library, a new foundation, and a new roof; and updating the electrical system. Outterbridge Grammar School was the first accredited grammar school in Martin County.

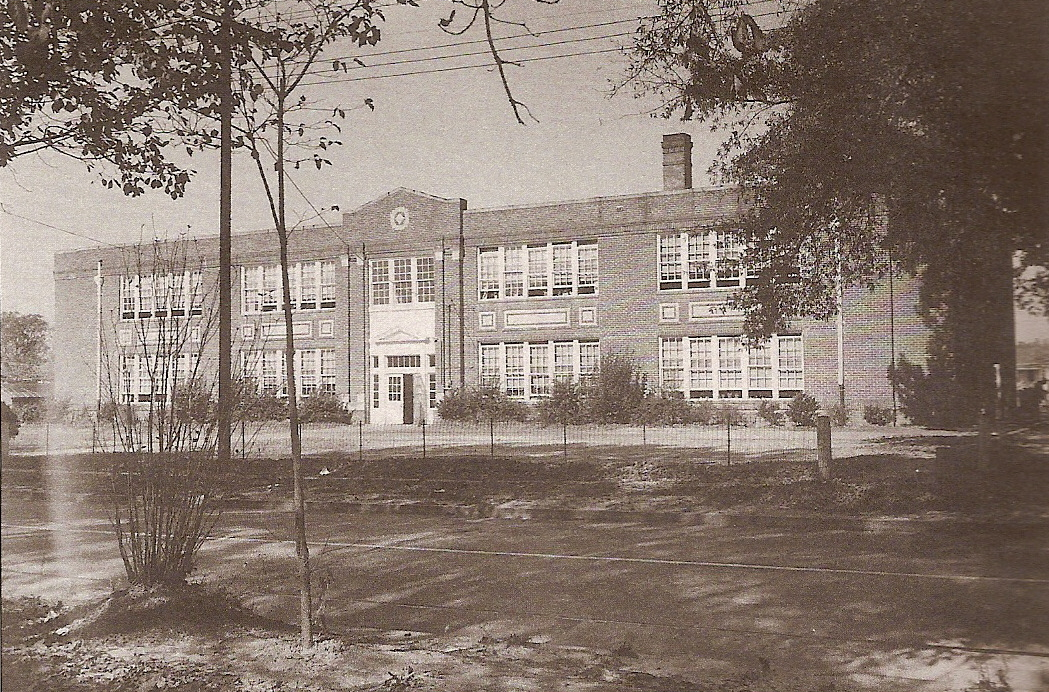
Outterbridge Grammar School / Robersonville Elementary School, used 1923–1974

A few blocks away on Academy Street, another brick school was built and occupied in September 1929. The first commencement exercises in the new Robersonville High School auditorium were held in April 1930. Public school music began in 1930. The school consists of sixteen rooms including; an auditorium and gymnasium, a suite of rooms set aside for home economics, a music room, principal's office, a library, and classrooms.

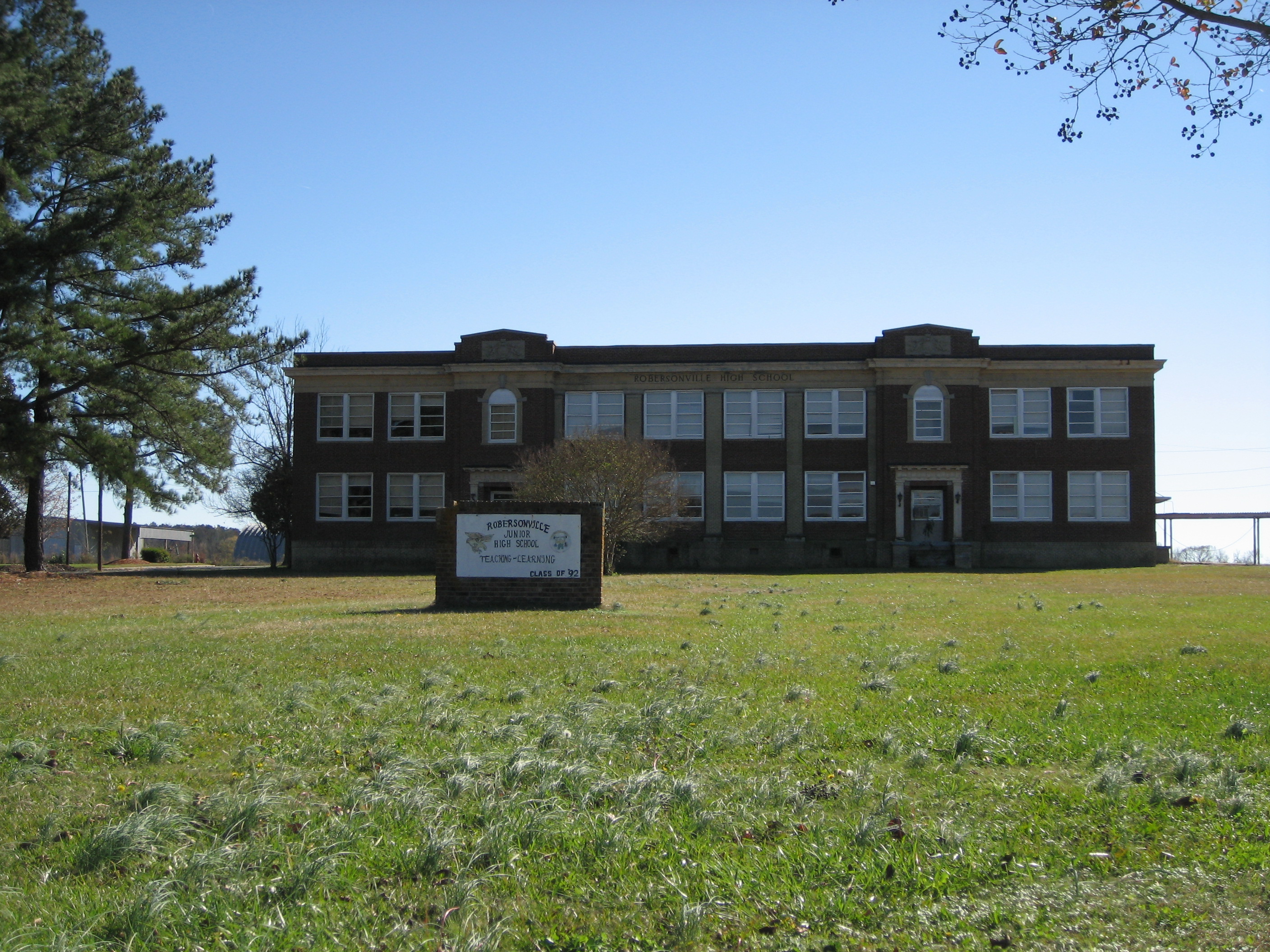
Robersonville High School

In 1936 a brick school was built on Cochran Street for black students in the southeastern section of Robersonville called New Town. The building consisted of eight classrooms, an auditorium, library, storage room, and an office. One of the classrooms was used for a lunchroom. The staff consisted of six teachers and Principal Armistead. At that time it was called Robersonville Colored Graded School. After Mr. Armistead died, Mr. N.W. Slade became principal in 1940.

In 1931, Mrs. Betty Gray used the old home economics room of the grammar school building to start the School Lunchroom Program, mainly to supplement the diet of needy children. Without a market for their produce, many farmers were glad to exchange chickens, eggs, ham, milk, etc., for meals for their children. Under the guidance of the Woman's Club, with Mrs. Vernon Ward, Mrs. Haywood Wilson, and Mrs. Betty Gray, summer garden and canning projects served to stock the lunchroom. In 1939–40 more than 110 lunches were furnished daily, about 95 of which were free. Mrs. Betty Gray worked as a volunteer in the lunchroom for five years. Mr. Marvin Everett, Building Principal of the Outterbridge Grammar School, assumed the business management of the lunchroom in 1938–48. A ruling was passed in 1944 requesting pupils of the grammar school to bring lunch and eat in the lunchroom. An important by-product of the lunchroom was the group feeling that was created by all eating together.

A high school lunchroom was maintained for two years, 1944–46, under the management of Mr. A. L. Hendron, principal. When vocational agriculture was resumed in the teaching program following the War in 1947–48, the agriculture building being used at the time as a lunchroom, had to be vacated. The high school students now bought tickets in advance and ate in the grammar school lunchroom. A new graded school lunchroom, built in 1948, continued to be used for both schools until the high school gained its own new lunchroom in 1954.

From 1936 until 1942, Mr. J. E. Aiken served as band leader. When he served in World War II, his wife took over for him. The key to the success of the band was in the material cooperation given by the patrons and parents. The patrons aided through the Robersonville Chamber of Commerce. It needed the band's participation in town festivals and parades in the surrounding area in support of the local tobacco market. After the gym, physical education room, and band room were built, the band was organized in December 1952 with Mr. E. C. Black as director. Mr. Joseph Secrest later replaced Mr. Black as band director.

After the construction in 1939 of a vocational agriculture building, the third vocational course was added to the curriculum. Also in 1939, the twelfth grade was added.

A community building, also called the teacherage, was constructed across from the grammar school in 1942 at a cost of $14,000. Before that time, teachers had boarded and roomed in private homes, the Wilson Hotel, and in the Paul D. Roberson apartment house.

In 1947, a gymnasium was built. In 1949, an outdoor athletic field was developed near the old Perdue plant, which benefited both the high school and the town of Robersonville. In 1952, an all-purpose home making department was built along with a foyer for the RHS gymnasium. This allowed the library to expand in the main building of the high school. Special Education was also added that year.

When the Parmele colored high school burned down in 1953, Martin County spent $210,000 to build East End High School on land adjoining the existing elementary school for blacks. Mr. Slade was principal with N. B. Jones as assistant principal.

The hazardous and dangerous situation then still existing at each end of Outterbridge Grammar School was corrected in 1954. In her book, Thelma Smith does not detail what that problem was. Need for two additional classrooms in this school was cited in 1954. The Johnson heirs property adjoining the school was purchased for $6,000 in 1959 and old home on that lot was razed for playground space. The playground survives today although the school burned in 1974.

In 1954 at the high school, heat was piped to the agriculture building from the gymnasium. An intercommunication system for the RHS was installed in January 1954.

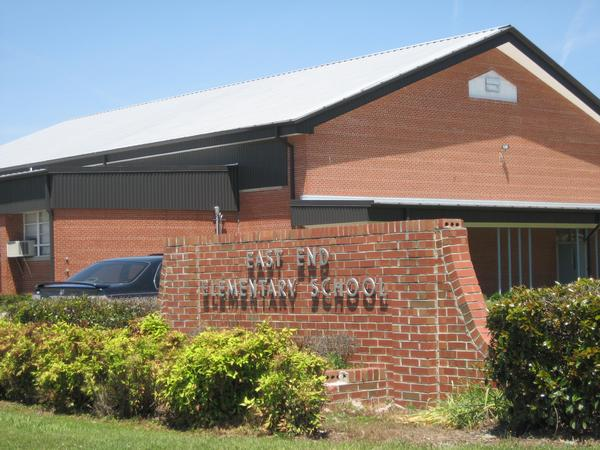
East End Elementary

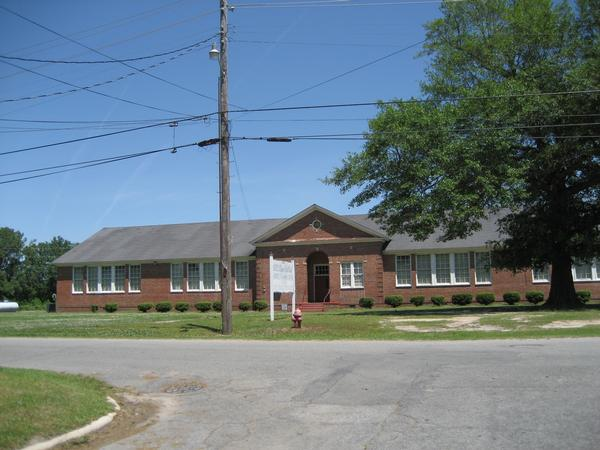
East End Alumni-W.C. Chance Cultural Center

After Thelma Smith published her history of Robersonville schools in 1959, Outterbridge Grammar School, located on Academy Street in the block between N. Outerbridge Street and Roberson Street, was renamed Robersonville Elementary School.

In 1970–71, the East End School was integrated with Robersonville High School. East End School, consisting of grades 4–8, became East End Middle School with N.W. Slade, principal, and Norman Moore, assistant principal. In 1971–72, Charles Coward was principal and B.S. Courtney was assistant principal.

When Robersonville Elementary School burned down in 1974, two new hallways with 10 classrooms and a library were added to East End to house grades K-3. After the burned school was demolished, the town built a little league baseball park, tennis court, and playground on the property between N. Outerbridge Street and Roberson Street. When Roanoke High School opened in 1975, Robersonville High School became the Junior High for grades 6–8. Later the school was known as Robersonville Middle School until it closed in December 2000. Roanoke Middle School opened in January 2001. The old RHS gymnasium is now being used for flea market type activities.

The black community has preserved the old East End School as a historical landmark and now calls it the W.C. Chance Alumni Cultural Center. The national W. C. Chance-East End Alumni Association was formed in 1985. The organization also has an after-school program, summer camp, and scholarship fund. The outreach program has placed the W. C. Chance-East End Alumni / Cultural Center as the cornerstone of the New Town Community and is committed to developing educational programs. It also hosts several events throughout the year, such as a Kwanzaa celebration, community meetings, art exhibits, church events, wedding receptions and family reunions.

== Churches ==
- Robersonville First Baptist Church – Railroad & Outerbridge Streets
- First Christian Church (Robersonville, North Carolina) - N. Main Street
- Lloyd's Chapel Church Of God In Christ – Lee House Road
- Grace Family Fellowship (Pentecostal) – S. Main Street
- Providence Missionary Baptist Church – Purvis & Mae Streets
- Roberson Missionary Baptist Church – Third & Cochran Streets
- Robersonville United Methodist Church – W. Second Street
- Robersonville Primitive Baptist Church (now St. James Place Museum) – N. Outerbridge Street
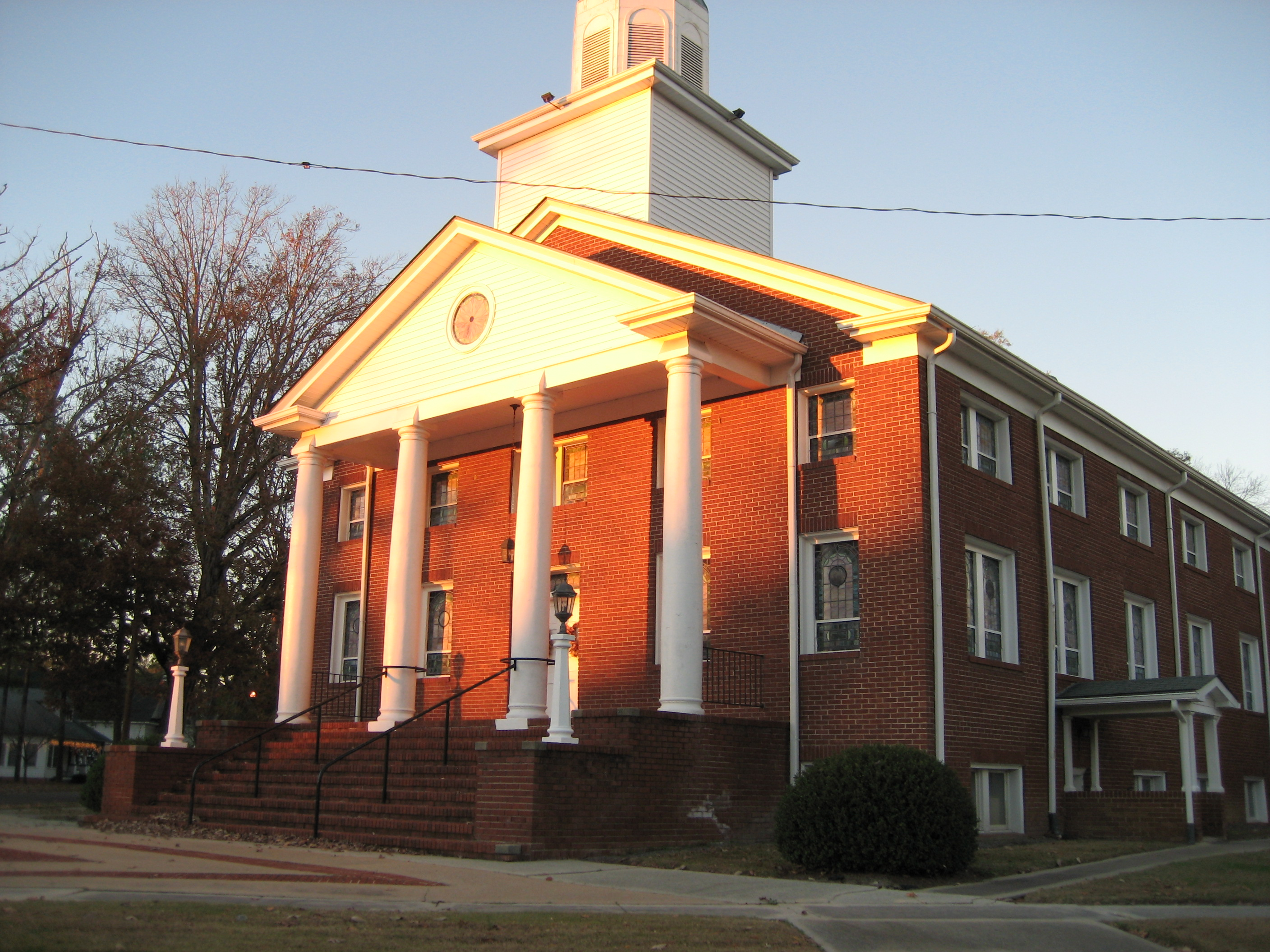
Robersonville First Baptist Church

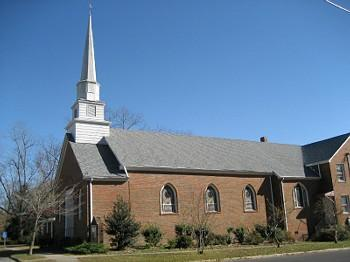
Robersonville United Methodist Church

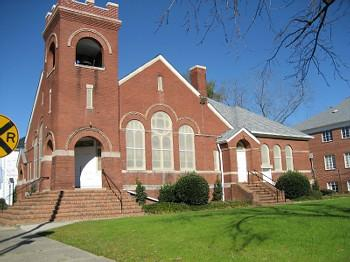
First Christian Church (Robersonville, North Carolina)

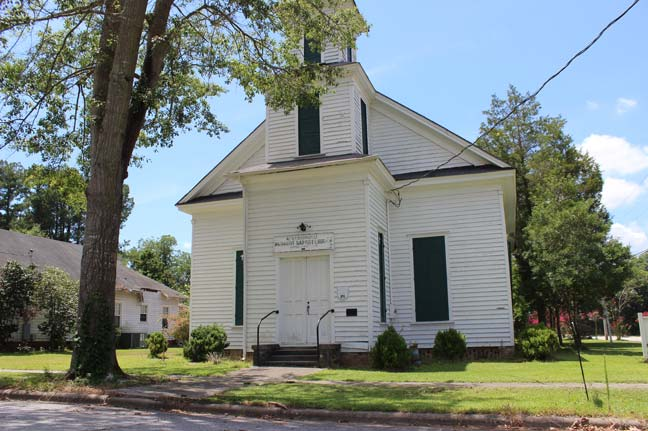
Robersonville Primitive Baptist Church

== Notable people ==
- Marcus Crandell, quarterback for East Carolina and several teams in the Canadian Football League, NFL Europe, and the XFL; MVP of the 89th Grey Cup
- William Drew Robeson, minister of Witherspoon Street Presbyterian Church in Princeton, New Jersey, and father of Paul Robeson; enslaved on the Roberson plantation until escaping north via the Underground Railroad in 1860
