= Riverside High School (Williamston, North Carolina) =

American public school in North Carolina

Location
- 1260 Godwin Ave; Williamston, North Carolina 27892; United States
- Coordinates: 35°50′11″N 77°04′11″W

Information
- Funding type: Public school
- Opened: 2010 (16 years ago)
- Status: Open
- School district: Martin County Schools
- CEEB code: 344345
- Principal: Grantley Mizelle
- Teaching staff: 25.11 (FTE)
- Grades: 9–12
- Enrollment: 470 (2023-2024)
- Student to teacher ratio: 18.72
- Colors: Navy blue and silver
- Team name: Knights
- Website: martin.k12.nc.us/o/riverside-high

Riverside High School was a public high school located in Williamston, North Carolina. It was one of two high schools in Martin County Schools that were created by way of consolidation circa 2010. Students formerly served by Jamesville High School and Williamston High School were served by this school, until July 2024 when the Martin County Board of Education merged South Creek High School and Riverside High School to form Martin County High School.
