= First Christian Church (Robersonville, North Carolina) =

Historic church in North Carolina, United States

- U.S. National Register of Historic Places
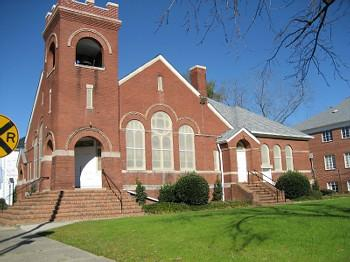

- Location within North Carolina Location within the United States
- Location: 126 S. Main St., Robersonville, North Carolina
- Coordinates: 35°49′22″N 77°15′11″W
- Area: 0.7 acres (0.28 ha)
- Built: 1913
- Architectural style: Romanesque
- NRHP reference No.: 05000353
- Added to NRHP: April 28, 2005

First Christian Church, also known as First Church of Christ, is an historic Disciples of Christ (DOC) church located at 126 S. Main Street in Robersonville, North Carolina, Martin County, North Carolina and was built in 1913. It is a one-story, brick-veneered, Romanesque Revival building with a cross-gable facade. The front facade features three arched stained-glass windows and a two-story corner bell tower. Also on the property is a contributing church cemetery.

It was added to the National Register of Historic Places in 2005.
