= Roanoke High School (North Carolina) =

Coordinates: 35.8565476°N 77.2432964°W

Former Roanoke High School
- Robersonville, North Carolina Principal= Grantley Mizelle

Information
- Type: Public
- Established: 1975
- Closed: 2010
- School district: Martin County Schools
- Colors: Purple, Silver, Black
- Mascot: Cougars

Roanoke High School was a public school in Martin County, North Carolina. It was one of four high schools in Martin County Schools. Due to consolidation, the school's student population was merged with Bear Grass High School at the beginning of the 2010–2011 school year. The two high schools merged to form South Creek High School in 2010. Subsequently, in 2024, the Martin County Board of Education merged South Creek High School and Riverside High School to form Martin County High School.

== Notable alumni ==
- Marcus Crandell, Canadian Football League quarterback
