= Sarah J. C. Whittlesey =

American poet

Sarah Johnson Cogswell Whittlesey
- Born: August 24, 1824; Williamston, North Carolina, U.S.
- Died: February 14, 1896 (aged 71; Alexandria, Virginia, U.S.
- Education: La Vallee Female Seminary
- Occupation: author
- Spouse: Henry A. Smith (m. 1842; div. 1850)
- Writing career
- Language: English
- Genres: poetry; hymns

Sarah J. C. Whittlesey (August 24, 1824 – February 14, 1896) was an American author, poet, and hymn writer, familiarly known to the readers of magazines and weekly journals of her day, for which she contributed both prose and verse. Generally, she was strongly Southern in her feelings, tastes, and style.

== Early life and education ==
Sarah Johnson Cogswell Whittlesey was born in Williamston, North Carolina, August 24, 1824. (Note: According to Appleton's (1889), Whittlesey was born "about 1825".)

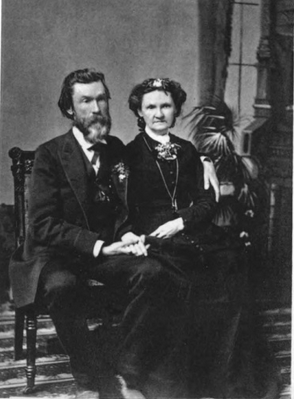
Oscar Columbus Whittlesey and his sister, Sarah (1889)

Her father, Luman Whittlesey, was from Washington, Connecticut, and was of New England ancestry. Her mother, Elizabeth G. Peale Whittlesey, was from North Carolina. Sarah had a younger brother, Oscar, as well as two older half-brothers, Edgar Augustus and Joseph Adolphus.

She was home-schooled until the age of fourteen. For the next two years, she studied at a school in Hamilton, North Carolina. She then studied at the La Vallee Female Seminary in Halifax County, North Carolina, graduating in 1841.

== Career ==
She married Henry A. Smith, of Lenox, Massachusetts, June 19, 1842, but abandoned him four years later. She removed to Virginia in 1848, and settled in Alexandria that year. Her divorce from Smith was finalized in 1850.

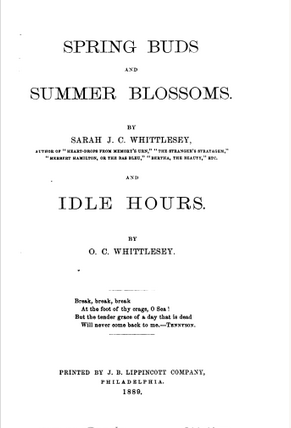
"Spring buds and summer blossoms"; "Idle Hours" (1889)

Whittlesey wrote a great deal for the periodical press, and repeatedly won prizes for stories adapted to serial publication à la feuilleton. She commenced rhyming at an early age, and published her first article in the Edenton Sentinel, in 1846. She published a book of poems, entitled Heart Drops from Memory's Urn; and through M. W. Dodd, New York, 1860, a volume of prose novelettes, entitled The Stranger's Stratagem; or, The Double Deceit; and other Stories. She received a prize from a North Carolina paper for a novelette, entitled Reginald's Revenge; also, from the same journal, a prize for a novelette, entitled The Hidden Heart. She again was the successful competitor for a prize offered by The American Union, of Boston, for The Maid of Myrtle Vale. In 1866, the publishers in New York of a series of dime novels appropriated one of Whittlesey's stories, The Bug Oracle, and published it without her knowledge or consent. Her longest novel, entitled Bertha, the Beauty, appeared in the Field and Fireside and was published in book form in Philadelphia, (1871). The Unwedded Wife awaited a publisher. Herbert Hamilton, or the Bas Bleu was a short novel, published in pamphlet form in Baltimore during the year 1867. Besides these several short stories had successful runs in the publishing weeklies: Alice Afton, Fifty Thousand and Failure, and The Counsellor Cousin, among the number. In 1889, Sarah and her brother Oscar co-published a book, the first part of which, Spring Buds and Summer Blossoms, was written by her, and the second part, Idle Hours, by him.

Whittlesey often wrote poetry. The texts of at least four hymns are attributed to her, including "Hark, the shining saints are sweetly singing"; "Let us be gladsome and let us be gay"; "The Sabbath morn is beaming"; and "They are safe in the harbor".

== Death and legacy ==
She died at her residence in Alexandria, Virginia, February 14, 1896. Her letters are held by the North Carolina State Archives.

== Selected works ==
- Heart Drops from Memory's Urn, 1852
- The Stranger's Strategem; or, The Double Deceit and Other Stories, 1860
- Herbert Hamilton, or the Bas Bleu, 1867
- Aunt Rebecca's Charge, and Other Stories, 1870
- Bertha, the Beauty, a Story of the Southern Revolution, 1871
- Spring Buds and Summer Blossoms, 1889
- The Unwedded Wife
- Stella's Stepmother

=== Hymns ===
- "Hark, the shining saints are sweetly singing"
- "Let us be gladsome and let us be gay"
- "The Sabbath morn is beaming"
- "They are safe in the harbor"
