= Williamston High School =

Location
- 200 Godwin Ave; Williamston, North Carolina 27892; United States
- Coordinates: 35.8363°N 77.0698°W

Information
- School type: Public
- Status: Closed
- Closed: 2010
- School district: Martin County Schools
- Grades: 9–12

Williamston High School was a public high school located in Williamston, North Carolina. It was one of four high schools in Martin County Schools and closed circa 2010. Students formerly served by this school were served by Riverside High School until July 2024, when the Martin County Board of Education merged South Creek High School and Riverside High School to form Martin County High School.
