= Jamesville High School =

Location
- 1215 South St. Andrews St. Jamesville, North Carolina 27846-0189; United States
- Coordinates: 35.8096°N 76.8978°W

Information
- School type: Public school, High school
- Status: Closed
- Closed: 2010
- School district: Martin County Schools
- Grades: 7-12
- Gender: Co-ed

Jamesville High School was a public high school located in Jamesville, North Carolina. It was one of four high schools in Martin County Schools and closed circa 2010. Students formerly served by this school are now served by Riverside High School.
