= Robersonville Primitive Baptist Church =

Historic church in North Carolina, United States

- U.S. National Register of Historic Places
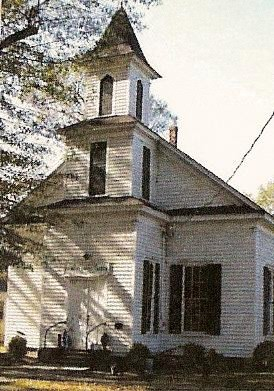

- Location within North Carolina Location within the United States
- Location: 107 N. Outerbridge St., Robersonville, North Carolina
- Coordinates: 35°49′28″N 77°15′29″W
- Area: 0.5 acres (0.20 ha)
- Built: 1910
- Architectural style: Front-gable with tower
- NRHP reference No.: 05000322
- Added to NRHP: April 20, 2005

Robersonville Primitive Baptist Church (also known as St. James Place Museum) is a historic Primitive Baptist church building at 107 N. Outerbridge Street in Robersonville, North Carolina that currently houses a museum of southern folk art.

The Gothic Revival building was originally constructed in 1910 as a Primitive Baptist church building for the congregation, founded in 1883. The building was later restored in the 1990s by Dr. Everette James and is now home to the St. James Place Museum.

== St. James Place Museum ==
The museum now houses original furnishings, southern folk art, and antique duck decoys. More than 100 North Carolina quilts, including 42 African-American examples, and hundreds of pieces of North Carolina pottery are exhibited. The museum is open year-round daily by appointment. Visitors may schedule free tours through the Robersonville Town Library. The building was added to the National Register of Historic Places in 2005.
