= Roberson-Everett-Roebuck House =

Historic house in North Carolina, United States

- U.S. National Register of Historic Places
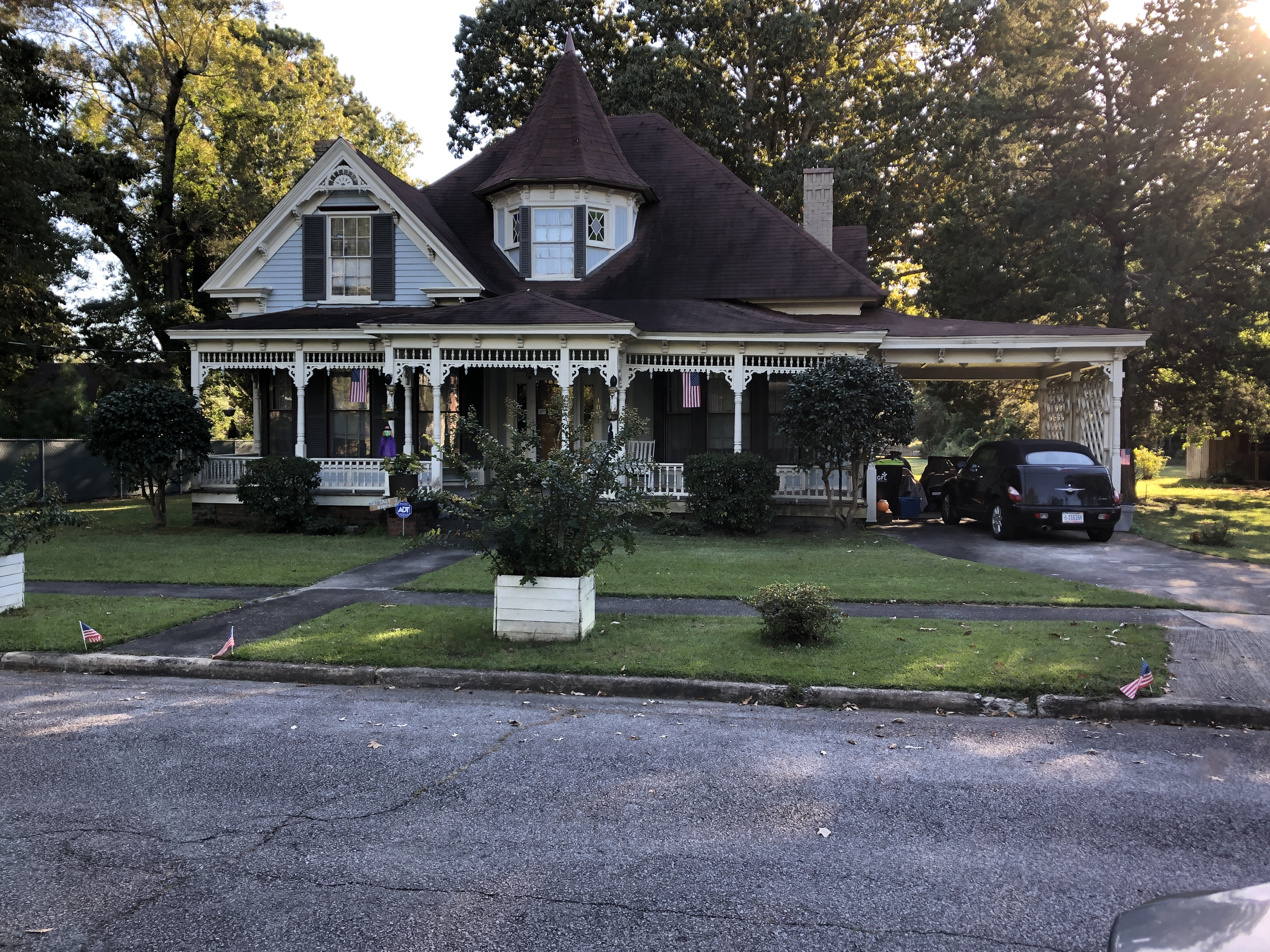

- Location within North Carolina Location within the United States
- Location: 105 S. Outerbridge St. Robersonville, North Carolina
- Coordinates: 35°49′25″N 77°15′26″W
- Area: 1.41 acres (0.57 ha)
- Built: c. 1900
- Architectural style: Queen Anne
- NRHP reference No.: 10000602
- Added to NRHP: August 30, 2010

Roberson-Everett-Roebuck House is a historic home located at Robersonville, Martin County, North Carolina. It was built about 1900, and is a 1 1/2-story, Queen Anne style frame cottage. It has a steeply pitched hipped roof with central tower, lower cross gables, front porch, and a double-pile center hall plan. The house features decorative woodwork including exterior gable ornaments, bracketed cornices, and the front porch balustrade and spindle frieze. Also on the property is a contributing combination wood and smokehouse.

It was added to the National Register of Historic Places in 2010.
