= Martin County Schools (North Carolina) =

Public school district for Martin County, North Carolina, US

Location
- 300 North Watts St. Williamston, North Carolina 27892 United States
- Coordinates: 35.857535°N 77.055139°W

District information
- Type: Public school (government funded)
- Grades: PK-12
- Superintendent: Dr. Chris Mansfield
- Budget: $40,584,000
- NCES District ID: 3702880

Students and staff
- Students: 3,993 (as of 2009)
- Teachers: 310.0 (on an FTE basis)
- Student–teacher ratio: 12.9

Other information
- Website: www.martin.k12.nc.us (currently redirects to the site at martin.sharpschool.net)

Martin County Schools is the public school district for Martin County, North Carolina, United States. The district serves the entire county, and there are no other districts within the county.

== Elementary schools ==
- Edna Andrews Elementary, Hamilton (defunct)
- Jamesville Elementary, Jamesville (PK-6) (NCES ID 370288000812)
- East End Elementary, Robersonville (defunct)
- Rodgers Elementary,Williamston (K-6) (NCES ID 370288001167)
- E.J. Hayes Elementary, Williamston (3-5) (NCES ID 370288001159)
- Williamston Primary, Williamston (PK-2) (NCES ID 370288001171)

== Middle schools ==
- Martin County Middle School, Williamston
  - Roanoke Middle Schoo, Robersonville (defunct; merged with Riverside to form Martin County)
  - Riverside Middle School, Williamston (defunct; merged with Roanoke to form Martin County)

== High schools ==
- Martin County High School, Williamston
  - South Creek High School, Robersonville (defunct; merged with Riverside to form Martin County)
    - Bear Grass High School, Williamston (defunct; merged with Roanoke to form South Creek)
    - Roanoke High School, Robersonville (defunct; merged with Bear Grass to form South Creek)
  - Riverside High School, Williamston (defunct; merged with South Creek to form Martin County)
    - Jamesville High School, Jamesville (defunct; merged with Williamston to form Riverside)
    - Williamston High School, Williamston (defunct; merged with Jamesville to form Riverside)
- Martin Innovative Early College, Williamston
