= Williamston, North Carolina =

- Town
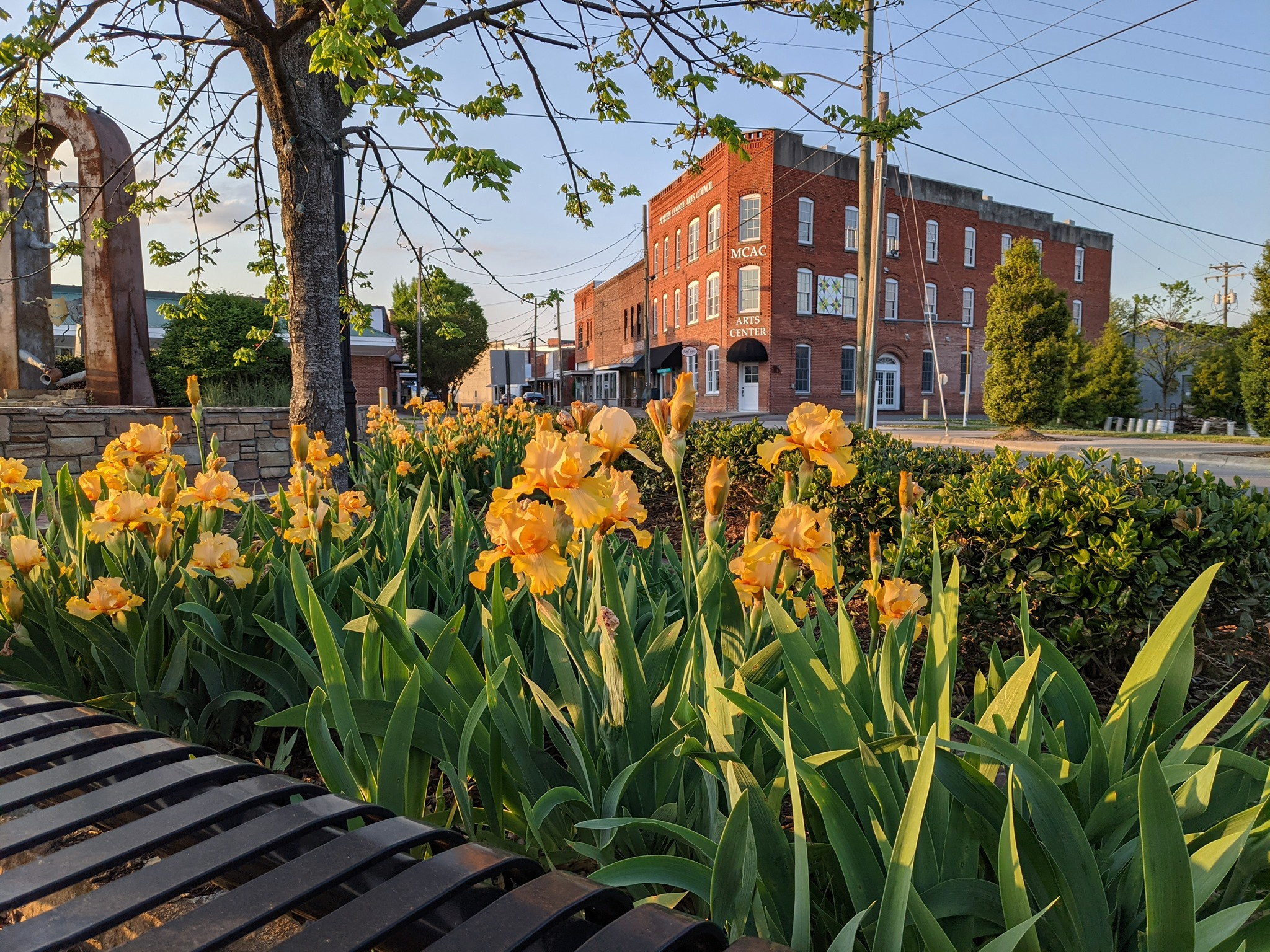
- Washington Street

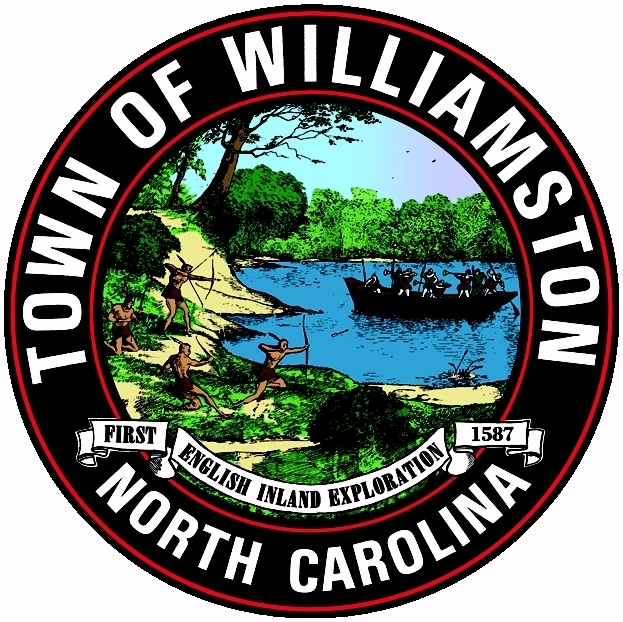
- Flag Seal
- Motto: "Easy Living with Hometown Values"
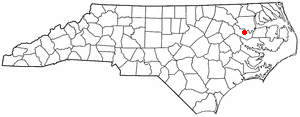
- Location in North Carolina
- Coordinates: 35°50′48″N 77°03′58″W
- Country: United States
- State: North Carolina
- County: Martin

Area
  - Total: 4.51 sq mi (11.68 km^{2})
  - Land: 4.51 sq mi (11.68 km^{2})
  - Water: 0 sq mi (0.00 km^{2})
- Elevation: 62 ft (19 m)

Population (2020)
  - Total: 5,248
  - Density: 1,163.3/sq mi (449.14/km^{2})
- Time zone: UTC-5 (Eastern (EST))
  - Summer (DST): UTC-4 (EDT)
- ZIP Code: 27892
- Area code: 252
- FIPS code: 37-74220
- GNIS feature ID: 2406889
- Website: townofwilliamston.com

Williamston is a town in and the county seat of Martin County, North Carolina, United States. The population was 5,248 at the 2020 census. It is located in North Carolina's Inner Banks region. The closest major city is Greenville, approximately 28 miles (45 km) to the southwest.

== History ==
Williamston was founded in 1779 and named after William Williams, a local military commander during the American Revolution.

Williamston was a focus of activity in the Civil Rights Movement. Beginning in June 1963, civil rights activists led by Golden Frinks protested at City Hall for 29 consecutive days. The Ku Klux Klan was very active in this part of the state during this time, including a well-documented rally in Williamston on October 5, 1963, attended by mostly local residents but with several carloads of attendees traveling over 150 miles to attend.

On August 3, 2023, Martin General Hospital in Williamston announced that Quorum Health, operator of the hospital, was filing for bankruptcy and closing the hospital. Martin General faced challenges as a result of a declining population and the preference of residents for other hospitals. Former hospital employees organized a protest, seeking the attention of an elected official, hoping to get the decision reversed. On August 14–15, Governor Roy Cooper visited Williamston to discuss the lack of medical care in rural parts of the state. He cited the recent hospital closure to explain why he supported expanding Medicaid across rural areas of North Carolina. On October 5, four clinics in Williamston also closed, further adding to the current healthcare crisis in the town.

== Geography ==
Williamston is in eastern North Carolina, in central Martin County. It is bordered to the north by the Roanoke River, which serves as the Bertie County line.

Major highways include US 13, US 17 and US 64. Tarboro is 30 miles (48 km) to the west and Plymouth is 20 miles (32 km) to the east, both by US 64. Washington is 22 miles (35 km) to the south by US 17, and Windsor is 13 miles (21 km) to the north via US 17 and 13 combined. Greenville is 35 miles (56 km) to the southwest via US 13 or 27 miles (43 km) by local highways.

According to the U.S. Census Bureau, the town of Williamston has a total area of 4.5 square miles (11.7 km^{2}), all land.

=== Climate ===
Williamston has a humid subtropical climate (Köppen Cfa) with long, hot summers and short, mild winters.

Climate data for Williamston, North Carolina, 1991–2020 normals, extremes 1952–present
| Month | Jan | Feb | Mar | Apr | May | Jun | Jul | Aug | Sep | Oct | Nov | Dec | Year |
|---|---|---|---|---|---|---|---|---|---|---|---|---|---|
| Record high °F (°C) | 80 (27) | 86 (30) | 89 (32) | 95 (35) | 97 (36) | 101 (38) | 101 (38) | 101 (38) | 100 (38) | 97 (36) | 86 (30) | 82 (28) | 101 (38) |
| Mean maximum °F (°C) | 73.3 (22.9) | 75.0 (23.9) | 81.0 (27.2) | 86.3 (30.2) | 90.6 (32.6) | 94.7 (34.8) | 95.9 (35.5) | 94.5 (34.7) | 90.9 (32.7) | 86.0 (30.0) | 79.5 (26.4) | 74.0 (23.3) | 97.4 (36.3) |
| Mean daily maximum °F (°C) | 51.8 (11.0) | 54.9 (12.7) | 62.0 (16.7) | 71.4 (21.9) | 78.2 (25.7) | 85.3 (29.6) | 88.5 (31.4) | 86.9 (30.5) | 81.8 (27.7) | 73.0 (22.8) | 63.1 (17.3) | 55.3 (12.9) | 71.0 (21.7) |
| Daily mean °F (°C) | 42.5 (5.8) | 45.2 (7.3) | 51.8 (11.0) | 60.8 (16.0) | 68.5 (20.3) | 76.3 (24.6) | 79.9 (26.6) | 78.4 (25.8) | 73.0 (22.8) | 62.6 (17.0) | 52.7 (11.5) | 45.8 (7.7) | 61.4 (16.3) |
| Mean daily minimum °F (°C) | 33.1 (0.6) | 35.4 (1.9) | 41.7 (5.4) | 50.1 (10.1) | 58.8 (14.9) | 67.3 (19.6) | 71.4 (21.9) | 69.9 (21.1) | 64.3 (17.9) | 52.1 (11.2) | 42.2 (5.7) | 36.3 (2.4) | 51.9 (11.1) |
| Mean minimum °F (°C) | 17.1 (−8.3) | 21.6 (−5.8) | 26.7 (−2.9) | 35.0 (1.7) | 45.0 (7.2) | 54.5 (12.5) | 62.0 (16.7) | 60.0 (15.6) | 51.8 (11.0) | 36.9 (2.7) | 27.1 (−2.7) | 23.0 (−5.0) | 15.6 (−9.1) |
| Record low °F (°C) | −3 (−19) | 8 (−13) | 7 (−14) | 24 (−4) | 34 (1) | 45 (7) | 51 (11) | 49 (9) | 40 (4) | 22 (−6) | 20 (−7) | 4 (−16) | −3 (−19) |
| Average precipitation inches (mm) | 3.69 (94) | 3.22 (82) | 4.13 (105) | 3.72 (94) | 3.69 (94) | 5.13 (130) | 5.75 (146) | 5.70 (145) | 6.92 (176) | 4.29 (109) | 3.39 (86) | 3.57 (91) | 53.20 (1,351) |
| Average snowfall inches (cm) | 0.0 (0.0) | 0.1 (0.25) | 0.0 (0.0) | 0.0 (0.0) | 0.0 (0.0) | 0.0 (0.0) | 0.0 (0.0) | 0.0 (0.0) | 0.0 (0.0) | 0.0 (0.0) | 0.0 (0.0) | 0.4 (1.0) | 0.5 (1.3) |
| Average precipitation days (≥ 0.01 in) | 10.9 | 9.8 | 11.3 | 9.9 | 10.4 | 10.0 | 11.3 | 10.8 | 10.3 | 8.2 | 8.5 | 10.9 | 122.3 |
| Average snowy days (≥ 0.1 in) | 0.0 | 0.0 | 0.0 | 0.0 | 0.0 | 0.0 | 0.0 | 0.0 | 0.0 | 0.0 | 0.0 | 0.2 | 0.2 |
Source 1: NOAA
Source 2: National Weather Service

== Demographics ==
Historical population
| Census | Pop. | Note | %± |
|---|---|---|---|
| 1860 | 616 | | — |
| 1870 | 520 | | −15.6% |
| 1880 | 482 | | −7.3% |
| 1890 | 751 | | 55.8% |
| 1900 | 912 | | 21.4% |
| 1910 | 1,574 | | 72.6% |
| 1920 | 1,800 | | 14.4% |
| 1930 | 2,781 | | 54.5% |
| 1940 | 3,966 | | 42.6% |
| 1950 | 4,975 | | 25.4% |
| 1960 | 6,924 | | 39.2% |
| 1970 | 6,570 | | −5.1% |
| 1980 | 6,159 | | −6.3% |
| 1990 | 5,503 | | −10.7% |
| 2000 | 5,843 | | 6.2% |
| 2010 | 5,511 | | −5.7% |
| 2020 | 5,248 | | −4.8% |
U.S. Decennial Census

=== 2020 census ===
Williamston racial composition
| Race | Number | Percentage |
|---|---|---|
| White (non-Hispanic) | 1,638 | 31.21% |
| Black or African American (non-Hispanic) | 3,234 | 61.62% |
| Native American | 23 | 0.44% |
| Asian | 60 | 1.14% |
| Other/Mixed | 147 | 2.8% |
| Hispanic or Latino | 146 | 2.78% |

As of the 2020 census, there were 5,248 people, 2,271 households, and 1,388 families residing in the town.

The median age was 44.6 years. 23.4% of residents were under the age of 18 and 24.8% were 65 years of age or older. For every 100 females, there were 76.2 males, and for every 100 females age 18 and over, there were 68.6 males.

97.5% of residents lived in urban areas, while 2.5% lived in rural areas.

Of all households, 28.2% had children under the age of 18 living in them. Of all households, 26.8% were married-couple households, 18.8% were households with a male householder and no spouse or partner present, and 49.4% were households with a female householder and no spouse or partner present. About 39.3% of all households were made up of individuals, and 21.2% had someone living alone who was 65 years of age or older.

There were 2,671 housing units, of which 15.0% were vacant. The homeowner vacancy rate was 2.9% and the rental vacancy rate was 7.5%.

=== 2000 census ===
As of the census of 2000, there were 5,844 people, 2,350 households, and 1,536 families residing in the town. The population density was 1,581.3 people per square mile (610.5 people/km^{2}). There were 2,506 housing units at an average density of 678.2 per square mile (261.9/km^{2}). The racial makeup of the town was 57.50% African American, 40.41% White, 0.29% Native American, 0.46% Asian, 0.09% Pacific Islander, 0.50% from other races, and 0.75% from two or more races. Hispanic or Latino of any race were 1.49% of the population.

There were 2,350 households, out of which 31.3% had children under the age of 18 living with them, 35.4% were married couples living together, 26.5% had a female householder with no husband present, and 34.6% were non-families. 31.9% of all households were made up of individuals, and 16.1% had someone living alone who was 65 years of age or older. The average household size was 2.38 and the average family size was 3.00.

In the town, the population was spread out, with 26.8% under the age of 18, 7.7% from 18 to 24, 23.2% from 25 to 44, 21.7% from 45 to 64, and 20.7% who were 65 years of age or older. The median age was 39 years. For every 100 females, there were 72.7 males. For every 100 females age 18 and over, there were 65.7 males.

The median income for a household in the town was $22,925, and the median income for a family was $32,984. Males had a median income of $28,661 versus $20,337 for females. The per capita income for the town was $14,125. 29.0% of the population and 22.8% of families were below the poverty line. 40.5% of those under the age of 18 and 28.6% of those 65 and older were living below the poverty line.

== Arts and culture ==
Williamston has long been a town centered around equine activity. Its logo showcases a horse, and the town houses one of the largest agricultural centers in Eastern North Carolina - the Senator Bob Martin Agricultural Center. Many events including horse shows, rodeos, tractor pulls, and monster truck shows take place in the Agricultural Center. Williamston also draws thousands of people to its annual "Carolina Country Stampede" in September. The two-day festival showcases local food, vendors, business owners, and bands, typically with a well known headlining band to end the festival such as Emerson Drive in 2017.

== Education ==
Williamston is served by Martin County Schools, a public school district that covers the entire county. The schools in the Williamston area include:

- Williamston Primary School, a school serving grades PK-2
- E.J Hayes Elementary School, a school serving grades 3-5
- Riverside Middle School, a school serving grades 6-8
- Martin County High School, a school serving grades 9-12

Williamston is also home to Martin Community College, a public community college noted for having its own equine health program.

== Infrastructure ==
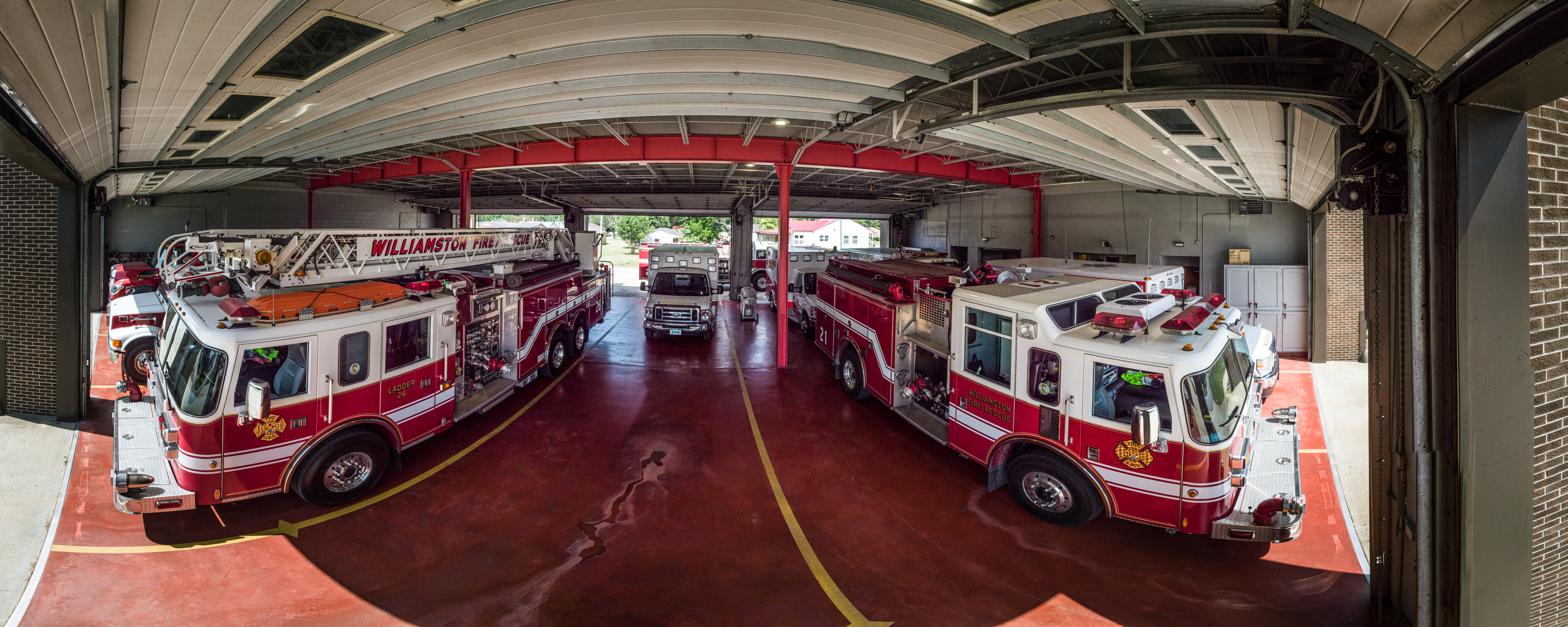
Williamston Fire Rescue EMS

=== Emergency services ===
The Williamston Fire Rescue EMS responds to approximately 2,500 fire, rescue, EMS or hazardous materials calls per year, and covers a 122 sq mi (320 km^{2}) area. It has 19 full-time members, and approximately 37 volunteers.

== Notable people ==
- Asa Biggs, U.S. congressman from North Carolina and federal judge
- Tillie Ehringhaus, First Lady of North Carolina
- William E. Ingram Jr., former director of the Army National Guard
- Gaylord Perry, Major League Baseball pitcher and member of the National Baseball Hall of Fame
- Jim Perry, Major League Baseball pitcher
- Sarah J. C. Whittlesey, author, poet, hymn writer
